= Bobby Boriello =

American mobster

- Born: Bartholomew Boriello; March 31, 1944; New York, New York, U.S.
- Died: April 13, 1991 (aged 47); Bensonhurst, Brooklyn, New York, U.S.
- Cause of death: Seven gunshot wounds
- Occupation: Mobster
- Allegiance: Gambino crime family

Bartholomew "Bobby" Boriello (March 31, 1944 – April 13, 1991) was an American mobster who belonged to the Gambino crime family and served as boss John Gotti's favorite bodyguard and chauffeur. A prominent hitman during the 1980s, Boriello participated in the 1990 murder of Gambino soldier Louis DiBono.

== Early years ==
Boriello grew up in New York, New York, surrounded by mobsters from the Gambino, Genovese, and Colombo crime families. His younger brother Stevie was a close friend of neighborhood gangsters Joseph "Crazy Joe" Gallo, Albert Gallo and Frank Illiano, and after Joey's murder, Stevie was instrumental in securing the crew's South Brooklyn rackets. A burly, 6-foot, 3-inch man, Boriello was a feared enforcer for the Gallo gang.

== Gambino crime family ==
Between 1967 and 1972, Boriello was arrested six times, on charges of weapons possession, assault, larceny and gambling.

In the 1980s, Boriello became a made man, or full member, in the Gambino family. He quickly developed close relationships with Gotti, Salvatore "Sammy the Bull" Gravano and two brothers, Nicholas Corozzo and Joseph "Jo Jo" Corozzo. Boriello and Gotti would often spend weekends together on Long Island, New York, partying, gambling, and attending performances by singer Jay Black, a childhood friend of Gotti. Boriello also conducted business at the One Over Golf Club, a social club in Carroll Gardens, operated by DeCalvacante associate, Joseph "Joe Pits" Conigliaro, a paraplegic gangster involved in loan sharking and gambling in the neighborhood who was killed January 23, 1998.

During his early days, Boriello was suspected in several gangland slayings, as well as involvement in extortion, loan sharking and drug trafficking.

=== Making ceremony ===
Former Gambino capo Michael "Mikey Scars" DiLeonardo testified that on December 24, 1988, he was led into an apartment located on Mulberry Street (the apartment belonged to Joe Butch Corrao's mother). Inside were the other men who were going to be inducted that evening, including Bobby Boriello, John Gotti, Jr., Dominick "Skinny Dom" Pizzonia, Craig DePalma and Nicholas LaSorsa. The men stood there with family capo John "Jackie Nose" D'Amico, along with other capo Gene Gotti. Sitting at the table, administering the oath was Salvatore "Sammy the Bull" Gravano, and Pasquale "Patsy" Conte.

=== Junior Gotti crew ===
After John Gotti promoted his son to capo at the behest of Sammy Gravano, and gave him his own crew, Gotti assigned Bobby Boriello to the Junior Gotti crew. Other crew soldiers included John "Jackie" Cavallo, Charles Carneglia, Thomas "Tommy Twitch" Cacciopoli, and later on the crew included Dominic "Fat Dom" Borghese, Vincent "Vinnie Butch" Corrao, Carmine Agnello, and Craig DePalma. The crew's associates included Steve Kaplan, Frank Lividisi, Michael McLaughlin, David Pietras, Jeff and Steve Dobies, Giovanni Tartaglia, John Ruggiero, John Alite, Louis Casaneti.

Boriello's business dealings were conducted in Manhattan, Queens, Staten Island, and throughout Brooklyn, especially South Brooklyn, where he associated with Gambino family wiseguys Angelo Paccione, Anthony "Toddo" Anastasio, Joseph Chirico, Anthony "Sonny" Ciccone, and many others, with interests in trucking, construction, and loan sharking.

Steven Kaplan was paying Boriello and Junior Gotti tribute for his investments in strip clubs up and down the East Coast. In 1987, Boriello crew member and close associate Anthony "Shorty" Mascuzzio from Carroll Gardens was killed in a New York nightclub owned by Kaplan. Low level mob associate David Fisher had been in a physical altercation with Mascuzzio, over a business squabble, and ended up shooting him to death.

=== Promotion ===
Boriello, being the most powerful and closest ally to John Gotti in the crew, was appointed acting capo of the Junior Gotti crew. In December 1990, soon after Junior became a capo, his father was indicted and set up a 5-man ruling panel to which Junior was appointed. Boriello operated his rackets from his Brooklyn social club on Sackett Street where he was about to rechange the order of rank of crew members from the club at the time he was murdered.

=== Mob hit ===
In 1990, Gotti told Boriello to murder Gambino soldier Louis DiBono. DiBono had secured the lucrative contract to install fireproofing foam on the infrastructure of the Twin Towers of the New York World Trade Center. After DiBono's death, Gravano took over the business.

On another occasion, Boriello unsuccessfully tried to kill Genovese crime family associate Preston Geritano on a Brooklyn street, firing shots at him in public. Since Geritano had relatives in the Genovese crime family, Genovese and Gambino representatives met to discuss his fate. Eventually the Gambinos released Geritano to the Genovese with the condition that he be killed if he tried to retaliate against Boriello. In 2004 Geritano's own brother-in-law Andrew Gargiulo stabbed him to death in broad daylight.

== Assassination ==
On April 13, 1991, Boriello was shot to death outside his Bensonhurst, Brooklyn home, on orders from Lucchese crime family underboss Anthony Casso. Casso received information to perform the Boriello murder from Louis Eppolito and Stephen Caracappa, two New York City Police Department officers working for the mob. The hit was carried out by Lucchese captain Frank "Big Frank" Lastorino. Lastorino shot Boriello twice in the head, and five times in the torso. Boriello died in the street beside his 1991 Lincoln Town Car, outside his home on Bay 29th Street. Borriello's wife, Susan, and their two young children were inside the home at the time of the shooting.

At the time of his murder, Boriello had been under investigation by multiple federal agencies and the Kings County District Attorney's Office for directing a cocaine trafficking conspiracy, as well as his suspected involvement in the murder of former family boss Paul Castellano. In fact, Gambino informant Dominick LoFaro fingered Boriello as one of the shooters in the slaying, reasoning that Boriello had been one of the more accomplished "hitters" in the family.

In jail at the time, Gotti ordered Gambino family members to meet with the leaders of the Genovese family after Boriello's assassination. Keeping to their earlier agreement, they agreed to kill Geritano. However, it wasn't until 2004 that Geritano was stabbed to death outside a Bay Ridge, Brooklyn, restaurant by his brother-in-law Andrew Garguilo. Earlier that day, Preston broke Gargiulo's arm with a baseball bat. The murder was unrelated to Boriello's murder, and it was later discovered that Lucchese captain Frank "Big Frank" Lastorino was ordered to kill Boriello as a message to Gotti. Sammy Gravano attended a sit-down with Genovese family acting boss Liborio Bellomo, seeking Geritano's execution. John Gotti sent word to Stevie Boriello that he had permission to avenge his brother's death by killing whomever he needed to, and had the backing of Gotti.

Stevie Boriello remained involved with the family after his brother's death, handling loan sharking, gambling, and extortion rackets in Brooklyn and Staten Island, where he currently resides.

== In popular culture ==
- Leo Rossi portrayed Boriello in the 2018 John Gotti biopic Gotti directed by Kevin Connolly and starring John Travolta as Gotti.

== See also ==
- Raab, Selwyn, "Team's Search Goes On For Killers of Castellano", New York Times, June 29, 1986. (Identifying Gene Gotti and Bobby Boriello as prime suspects in the slayings of Paul Castellano and Tommy Bilotti).
- "Informer Identifies Alleged Gunman", Washington Post, September 6, 1986.
