= Dominick Cirillo =

American mobster (1929–2024)

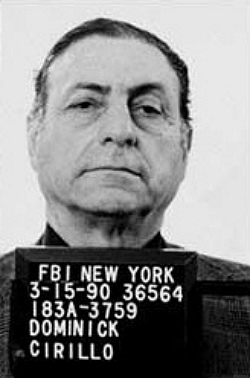
Mug shot of Cirillo taken in 1990

Dominick "Quiet Dom" Cirillo (July 4, 1929 – January 14, 2024) was a longtime high-ranking member of the Genovese crime family. Long holding allegiance to the family's Manhattan faction, Cirillo rose in power to caporegime, then briefly served as acting boss for imprisoned boss Vincent "Chin" Gigante, before stepping down to serve as consigliere.

== Early life ==
Cirillo was born in East Harlem on July 4, 1929, to Colombo crime family caporegime of Neapolitan-Italian Alphonse Cirillo who served as a made man under Joseph Magliocco when it was the Profaci crime family. Alphonse was a first generation Italian-American immigrant from Potenza, Basilicata, Italy. In 1961, his father Alphonse was implicated in the attempted murder of Lawrence Gallo, a brother of fellow Profaci crime family soldier Joseph Gallo. Alphonse, Carmine Persico and Salvatore D'Ambrosio were the suspected attempted murderers, but Gallo refused to cooperate and no one was charged in the attack. His father died of unknown causes sometime before 1963 but was later made infamous after he was one of the hundreds of organized crime figures named in the testimony of mob turncoat Joseph Valachi. His father Alphonse through his lifetime had succeeded in never being arrested for a single criminal act except for "criminally receiving" as an early 1960s era organized crime mob family chart had stated. He is the brother of Gaetano "Wheeg" Cirillo and the father-in-law to mob associate John Caggiano. Dominick grew up on East 117th Street in East Harlem and as a teenager dropped out of Benjamin Franklin High School. He was an amateur boxer who boxed at neighborhood youth clubs and briefly pursued a career as a professional middleweight boxer. He was a husky man who stands at 5'10" and grew to be almost 200 pounds by the 1990s. He was a close personal friend and criminal partner of Vincent Gigante from a young age, who would later become heir to the Genovese crime family of which Dominick served in. Mob soldier Frank "Frank California" Condo and Frederico Giovanelli often laughed at Dominick's choice of clothing attire that was said to be reminiscent of Emmett Kelly's clown suits.

In 1949, Dominick who at the time was a twenty-year-old welterweight was knocked out in three matches and had one match drawn before retiring. In 1953, at the age of twenty three he pleaded guilty to overseeing a clandestine heroin trafficking ring that was said to have grossed up to $20,000 a day. For his drug trafficking conviction he served nearly four years in Federal Correctional Institution, Milan in Milan, Michigan, before returning to East Harlem. Between 1958 and 1965, he was arrested four times for consorting with known criminals, which were all later dismissed. He is married to an Italian-American woman named Bella who bore him two children, Nicholas and Anne Marie. Whenever fellow criminal associates would want to mention Cirillo's name they used an adapted clandestine sign language where they put their finger to their lips which would mean that they were discussing Dominick. He claimed to be a retired construction worker and said to live off of $510 a month in social security checks. He lived in the Country Club section of the northeast Bronx, near Pelham Bay Park and Eastchester Bay.

== Boxing career ==
Dominick started out as a boxer with future Genovese crime family boss Thomas Eboli ("Tommy Ryan") as his manager and world heavyweight champion Tommy Ryan worked as his trainer. Cirillo gradually drifted towards the criminal side of the neighborhood, along with another boxer and associate, Vincent "Chin" Gigante. As a boxer he weighed between 151 and 156 pounds. He was an unsuccessful professional middleweight boxer in 1949. His first professional fight was against Matt Ward on March 9, 1949, held at Westchester County Center in White Plains, New York, which he lost. He fought Emerson Charles on March 23 with Emerson Charles also at Westerchester County Center. He fought Bobby Holt at Manhattan Center on April 6, 1949. He fought Mike Gillo at the New Haven Arena in New Haven, Connecticut, on May 4, 1949, and Johnny Kohan at Laurel Garden Arena in Central Ward, Newark, New Jersey. During his short lived boxing career he boxed sixteen rounds and lost three matches, withdrew from one and won just a single match. While he was a boxer Dominick weighed between 152 and 154 pounds. His last professional boxing match against Johnny Kohan on December 19, 1949, in Newark, New Jersey. He suffered two knock outs by Matt Ward on March 9, 1949, which was also his first professional match and once again by Emerson Charles on March 23, 1949. His one disqualified match was against Bobby Holt on April 6, 1949, at the Manhattan Center.

== Genovese crime family ==
His first conviction came in 1952, when he was imprisoned on narcotics charges. In subsequent years, he grew closer to Gigante, who was seen, in the mid-1980s, as the de facto boss of the Genovese crime family. While Gigante served as boss on the streets, Cirillo served in a 'messenger' between Gigante and the other caporegimes of the Genovese crime family, as Cirillo's low-key style earned him his nickname "Quiet Dom" and helped him avoid the gaze of the authorities for many years.

== Gigante's acting boss ==
After Gigante was imprisoned in 1997 for racketeering and conspiracy charges, the leadership of the Genovese crime family passed to a committee/ruling panel, known as the "Administration," ostensibly led by Cirillo. In this capacity, Cirillo represented the Genoveses in their dealings with the other Mafia families of New York City, though Gigante remained in overall charge of the family. In this way, Cirillo served as "acting boss" and was seen by US authorities as the most powerful member of the Genovese family. However, in 1998 Cirillo stepped down as acting boss because of a heart attack, and recovered his position as caporegime in the Genovese crime family that same year.

== Nick Cirillo missing ==
Cirillo's son, Nicholas, who was not believed to be a made man, disappeared on May 9, 2004. Three weeks later his abandoned car was discovered, but Nicholas Cirillo has never been found. Investigators believe the younger Cirillo was killed after he insulted the son of acting Bonanno crime family boss Vincent "Vinny Gorgeous" Basciano and caporegime Dominick Cicale. It remains unclear whether this would have been allowed to happen without the explicit permission of Dominick Cirillo. Sources in 2010 say that Dom ordered the death of Nicholas on Mothers Day of 2004. On December 4, 2004, Randolph Pizzolo, who allegedly bragged about his role in the murder and disappearance of Nicholas, was found shot to death.

== Trial and guilty plea ==
On October 18, 2005, Cirillo, who again was recognized as "acting boss" for Gigante, and four Genovese capos, Lawrence "Little Larry" Dentico, John "Johnny Sausage" Barbato and Anthony "Tico" Antico, pleaded guilty on charges of racketeering and racketeering conspiracy. Cirillo was sentenced to 48 months in prison and forced to pay $75,000 restitution.

== Consigliere ==
On August 22, 2008, the 79-year-old Cirillo was released from federal prison after serving more than three years. After being "acting boss" following the death of longtime family godfather Vincent "Chin" Gigante in December 2005, Cirillo began to serve as consigliere of the Genovese family. It appears that he had stepped down in 2015 to allow former street boss Peter "Petey Red" DiChiara to serve as consigliere.

Cirillo died on January 14, 2024, at the age of 94.

American Mafia
New title	Genovese crime family Messaggero; 1981–1997	Succeeded by Andrew Gigante
Preceded by Vincent "The Chin" Gigante as boss	Genovese crime family Acting boss 1997–1998	Succeeded by Matthew "Matty the Horse" Ianniello
Preceded by Ernest "Ernie" Muscarella	Genovese crime family Acting street boss 2003–2005	Succeeded by Mario Gigante
Preceded by Lawrence "Little Larry" Dentico	Genovese crime family Consigliere; 2008–2015	Peter "Petey Red" DiChiara
