= Crazy Joe (film) =

1974 film by Carlo Lizzani

- Theatrical release poster
- Directed by: Carlo Lizzani
- Screenplay by: Lewis John Carlino
- Story by: Dino Maiuri; Massimo De Rita
- Based on: Articles by Nicholas Gage
- Produced by: Dino De Laurentiis
- Starring: Peter Boyle; Paula Prentiss; Fred Williamson; Rip Torn; Charles Cioffi; Eli Wallach
- Cinematography: Aldo Tonti
- Edited by: Peter Zinner
- Music by: Giancarlo Chiaramello
- Production companies: Produzion De Laurentiis International Manufacturing Company S.P.A.; Bright-Persky Associates
- Distributed by: Cineriz (Italy); Columbia Pictures (US)
- Release dates: 8 February 1974 (Italy); 15 February 1974 (New York)
- Running time: 100 minutes
- Countries: Italy; United States
- Language: English
- Box office: ₤628.266 million (Italy)

Crazy Joe is a 1974 crime film directed by Carlo Lizzani and produced by Dino De Laurentiis. The Italian-American co-production is a fictionalized account of the murder of Joseph "Crazy Joe" Gallo, a mobster who was gunned down on April 7, 1972, at a restaurant in Little Italy. The screenplay by Lewis John Carlino is based on a series of articles by journalist Nicholas Gage. The film stars Peter Boyle in the title role, with Paula Prentiss, Fred Williamson, Rip Torn, Charles Cioffi, Luther Adler, Henry Winkler and Eli Wallach.

== Plot ==
In New York City, hot-tempered gangster Joe Gallo pulls a knife on a man in a theater who complains about Joe's talking during the movie. Joe later enters a car with his brother Richie and cronies Jelly and Mannie. They don masks, pull guns and perform a mob assassination at a restaurant.

Joe and Richie are offended when their boss Falco does not invite them into his home when they arrive for payment of their crime. Falco pays them just $100 each for the job. They crash through the gates of his stately lakeside mansion and take Falco's brother and others prisoner. Don Vittorio, the head of all New York crime families, settles the dispute. Falco agrees to reward Joe and Richie in the future, but he double-crosses them, his thugs nearly strangling Richie to death before burying Jelly in cement.

Coletti, who also betrayed Joe and Richie, takes over Falco's operations after the terminally ill Falco dies inside an iron lung. Richie is also ill, suffering from a stomach ailment. His brother is set up, cops catching him red-handed as he tries to extort a merchant. Joe is sent to prison, where he befriends Willy, a black inmate, and helps Willy instigate a prison riot over the prison's unjust conditions. Joe is glad to have a new ally, particularly with the terminally ill Richie committing suicide by driving a car off a cliff.

As soon as Joe gets out of jail, he returns to New York and the woman in his life, Anne, then begins building his crime organization with the help of Willy and Harlem associates. "Crazy Joe" becomes a notorious figure in New York, known for his temper but also for his colorful associations around town.

Joe has a confrontation with Coletti and vows to avenge the betrayal that landed him behind bars. But before he can, Don Vittorio beats him to it. Upset with an Italo-American federation Coletti has organized that attracted unwanted attention to the crime families, Don Vittorio arranges for Coletti to be assassinated at a rally and for Joe to be blamed.

Anne pleads with Joe to leave town, and an angry Willy needs to be convinced that Joe was not the one responsible for Coletti's murder. When he and Willy go to Don Vittorio's home to discuss the situation, Joe threatens the mob boss rather than believe his offer to work together. Vittorio immediately puts out a contract on Joe, and at a restaurant where he, Anne and Willy are having dinner, gunmen turn up and open fire, both men ending up dead.

== Cast ==
- Peter Boyle as Joe Gallo
- Paula Prentiss as Anne
- Fred Williamson as Willy Bates
- Eli Wallach as Don Vittorio Giovanni
- Rip Torn as Richie Gallo
- Charles Cioffi as Vince Coletti
- Luther Adler as Danny Falco
- Carmine Caridi as Jelly
- Henry Winkler as Mannie
- Sam Coppola as Chick
- Franco Lantieri as Nunzio
- Louis Guss as Magliocco
- Fausto Tozzi as Frank
- Guido Leontini as Angelo
- Mario Erpichini as Danny
- Michael V. Gazzo as Sal
- Adam Wade as J.D.
- Hervé Villechaize as Samson
- Gabriele Torrei as Cheech
- Peter Savage as DeMarco
- Tony Lip as Andy
- Cornelia Sharpe as Movie Actress

== Production ==
According to Variety, the screenplay for Crazy Joe was based on a series of articles on mafia wars by The New York Times reporter Nicholas Gage. Director Carlo Lizzani stated that the reason he made the film was because he felt that Gallo's story was a mirror image of a character who was "typical of the '68 movements. Gallo was a young Mafioso who gathered the young against the old, just as it happened in China in the name of Mao and in the rest of the world as well." Lizzani went on that "What's more - a sacrilegious thing in the Mafia - he made a pact with the Black Panthers, an interracial alliance! I could choose ten other different stories, I could do whatever I wanted and I had the money to do it, but for these reasons I chose to do Crazy Joe. It was a parable that symbolized a season of our contemporary society."

Martin Scorsese was initially going to be Lizzani's assistant on the film, while Lizzani's original choice for the role of Gallo was going to be Robert De Niro, after seeing him in Bloody Mama. Filming began on 25 June 1973, and took place entirely on location in New York City.

The style of Crazy Joe is Poliziotteschi, a subgenre of films that was popular in Italy in the 1960s & 1970s.

== Release ==
Crazy Joe was distributed theatrically in Italy by Cineriz on 8 February 1974. The film grossed a total of 628,266,000 Italian lire domestically. Italian film historian and critic Roberto Curti described the film a "commercial failure" in Italy, noting that it grossed less than "mediocre genre products such as Kidnap, despite a sturdy cast". The credits of the Italian version of the film are largely incomplete, and differ from the credits of the American version; for instance, the former version credits Dino Maiuri, Massimo De Rita and Lizzani with the screenplay, while the latter credits Lewis John Carlino as the sole screenwriter. The Italian version also does not credit an editor, who is identified as Peter Zinner in the American version.

The film opened in New York on 15 February 1974. It was distributed by Columbia Pictures in the United States. The Daily Variety reported that on same date, Barry Slotnick, a lawyer for Mafia member Joseph Colombo intended to file an injunction against Crazy Joe. This involved a claim that the character of Coletti was based on Colombo, which violated his "right of privacy." Colombo was comatose during this period after being shot in the head in June 1971. Daily Variety reported on 26 Feb 1974 that a New York Supreme Court judge ruled against the injunction, as the film was not an invasion of Colombo's privacy.

== Reception ==
From a contemporary review, Vincent Canby found that the film presented the "ins and outs of Mafia family wars [as] difficult to follow as pre-World War I Balkan politics, though not quite so fascinating." Canby continued that Peter Boyle played Joe as if he were a "dim‐witted numbers runner", and that casting Paula Prentiss as his girl was "one of the minor mysteries of the movie year. Could she have wandered onto the wrong set?"

== See also ==
- List of Italian films of 1974
- List of American films of 1974

== Notes ==
=== References ===
- Curti, Roberto (2013). Italian Crime Filmography, 1968-1980. McFarland. ISBN 978-0786469765.
