= Crazy Joe =

Crazy Joe may refer to:

- the nickname of mobster Joe Gallo
- Crazy Joe (film), a 1974 film about Joe Gallo, starring Peter Boyle
- "Crazy" Joe Davola, a fictional character from the TV series Seinfeld
- Josip Šimunić, sometimes referred to in Croatian as "Ludi Joe" (Crazy Joe)
