= Albert Gallo =

American mobster

- Born: June 6, 1930 (age 96); Brooklyn, New York, U.S.
- Occupation: Mobster
- Relatives: Joe Gallo (brother); Larry Gallo (brother)

Albert "Kid Blast" Gallo, Jr. (born June 6, 1930) is an American mobster of the Genovese crime family.

== Biography ==
Albert Gallo was born on June 6, 1930, in Red Hook, Brooklyn. His parents were Albert (Umberto) and Mary Gallo (née Nunziata). His two older brothers were Lawrence "Larry" Gallo and Joe "Crazy Joey" Gallo.

A bootlegger during Prohibition, Albert Sr. did not discourage his three sons from becoming criminals. Albert Gallo joined his brothers Larry and Joey in a gang that controlled President Street in South Brooklyn.

At one point, Albert Gallo lived in the Greenwood section of Brooklyn. In the late 1970s, Gallo told the media that he owned a furniture company. It is unknown if Gallo is married or has a family.

=== Profaci crime family ===
The three Gallo brothers became affiliated with capo Harry Fontana's crew in the Profaci crime family, then headed by boss Joseph Profaci.

In 1957, Profaci allegedly asked Joe Gallo and his crew to murder Albert Anastasia, the boss of the Gambino crime family. On October 25, 1957, Anastasia was murdered by two disguised men in the barber shop of a Manhattan hotel. It is unknown if Albert Gallo participated in the Anastasia killing. Some say it was Colombo mobster Carmine Persico, who participated in the shooting of Anastasia.

Eventually, Larry and Joey both became inducted members of the Profaci family. However, Albert never achieved this status in the family. Although Joey was the most explosive and strong-willed of the brothers, Larry was the organized thoughtful one who actually ran the crew. Younger brother Albert tended to stay in the background.

By the end of the 1950s, the Gallo brothers had become very dissatisfied with Profaci's leadership. Profaci was maintaining a lavish lifestyle by severely taxing everyone else in his crime family. In 1959, Profaci ordered the Gallos to murder fellow crew member Frank Abbatemarco, who ran lucrative bookmaking and loan sharking operations. Abbatemarco owed Profaci $50,000 in unpaid tribute and refused to pay it out of protest. On November 4, 1959, Abbatemarco was shot inside a tavern in the Carroll Gardens section of Brooklyn. Some accounts state that Albert, his brothers and Joseph "Joe Jelly" Gioelli killed Abbatemarco. Other reports say that Joey Gallo refused the assignment on behalf of the crew. After Abbatemarco's murder, Profaci took his rackets, leaving nothing for the Gallo crew.

=== First Colombo War ===
Albert and the Gallo crew now turned against Profaci. In February 1961, the Gallos kidnapped underboss Joseph Magliocco and capos Frank Profaci, John Scimone and Joseph Colombo. Profaci was a target also, but he managed to escape capture. To obtain their release, Profaci negotiated an agreement with the Gallos. However, after the hostage were released, Profaci reneged on the agreement and went after the Gallo crew. On August 20, 1961, Scimone, now a Profaci loyalist, lured Larry Gallo into meeting him at a lounge, where several men, including Persico, tried to kill him. This was the start of the First Colombo War.

On December 21, 1961, Joey Gallo was sentenced seven to fourteen years in prison, but the conflict continued. In June 1962, Profaci died of cancer and the family leadership passed to Magliocco.

On January 29, 1962, Albert Gallo and six other crew members rescued six small children from an apartment filled with smoke by a mattress fire. None of the children or mobsters were injured.

In 1963, with the conviction of two more Gallo crew members, both sides accepted a peace agreement brokered by Patriarca crime family boss Raymond L.S. Patriarca. The first war was over, with the Profaci crime family becoming the Colombo crime family.

=== Peacetime ===
On January 8, 1965, Albert and Larry Gallo, along with 13 other crew members, pleaded guilty to misdemeanor assault and were sentenced to six months in prison.

In 1966, New York City's Youth Board requested that Albert Gallo and his brothers help them lower racial tensions between white and African-American youths in the East New York and Flatbush sections of Brooklyn. At one meeting with white youths, Albert Gallo sent a teenager sprawling for using a racial epithet. Brooklyn District Attorney Aaron Koota protested the use of the Gallo brothers, but New York Mayor John V. Lindsay defended the Youth Board's actions.

On October 24, 1967, Albert Gallo was indicted on charges related to a ticket cashing racket at Roosevelt Raceway in Westbury, New York.

On May 16, 1968, Larry Gallo died of cancer. Joe Gallo took control of the Gallo crew from prison.

=== Second Colombo War ===
In 1971, Joe Gallo was released from prison. Later that year, boss Joseph Colombo was shot and paralyzed. Former Gallo crew member Carmine Persico now took control of the family through a series of front bosses. Convinced that the Gallos had tried to kill Colombo, the Colombo leadership went after Joey Gallo.

On April 7, 1972, gunmen murdered Joey Gallo in Umberto's Clam House in Manhattan's Little Italy, starting the Second Colombo War. John "Mooney" Cutrone, a made man and close confidant of both Larry and Joey, was seen as Joey's logical successor. However, to maintain harmony in the crew, Cutrone supported Albert for capo. The untested and less experienced Albert now became boss of the Gallo crew.

In August 1972, Albert Gallo learned that several members of the Colombo leadership, including Alphonse Persico (Carmine Persico's brother) and Gennaro Langella would be meeting at the Neapolitan Noodle restaurant on the Upper East Side of Manhattan. The Gallo crew hired a hitman from Las Vegas to ambush and murder the Colombo leaders. However, at the restaurant, the confused hitman shot four innocent meat wholesalers instead of the mobsters. Two of his victims died. In the following months, an uneasy truce prevailed between the Colombos and the Gallos.

=== Cutrone defection ===
In 1974, the truce was shattered when Cutrone and his followers defected back to the Colombo family. Cutrone, Gerry Basciano, Sammy Zahralbam, and other Gallo members had become dissatisfied with their lack of income under Albert's leadership.

Almost immediately, violence broke out between the Gallo and Cutrone factions. Gallo loyalist James Geritano wiretapped Basciano's phone, allowing them to plan an ambush. On July 1, 1974, Basciano and Zahralbam were shot and wounded on a Brooklyn sidewalk, but escaped serious injury. In August 1974, the Cutrone faction shot and killed Gallo loyalist Stevie Cirillo while he was playing craps at a charity benefit in a Brooklyn synagogue. On September 11, 1974, a sniper shot and seriously wounded Gallo loyalist Frank "Punchy" Illiano, Albert's lieutenant, near the Gallo headquarters on President street.

=== Leaving the Colombo crime family ===
In the autumn of 1974, the Mafia Commission intervened in the Gallo/Cutrone conflict. The family bosses believed that the violence was interfering with business and bringing public attention to their activities. The Commission negotiated an agreement under which Albert and his followers would join the crew of Vincent Gigante, then a powerful capo in the Genovese Family. Cutrone and his rebels would remain with the Colombo Family. Losing members, running out of money and virtually besieged in their President Street headquarters, the Gallo crew had no other choice. The Second Colombo War was over.

In February 1976, the peace agreement was violated when a sniper fired two gunshots into the Gallo headquarters, slightly wounding crew member Steven Boriello. Now part of Genovese family, Albert immediately filed a formal protest to the Colombo leadership. The Colombo bosses responded by summoning Cutrone and Basciano to a "sitdown" to explain their actions. Neither man attended the meeting; they also ignored summons from the Genovese leadership.

At this point, the mob families lost patience with Cutrone and Basciano. On June 16, 1976, a gunman shot and killed Basciano while he was eating at a luncheonette. Cutrone went into hiding, but the Colombos convinced him that Basciano's death ended the problem. On October 5, 1976, a gunman shot and killed Cutrone while he was eating breakfast at a diner.
