= John Barbato =

American mobster (1934–2025)

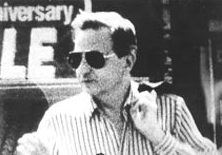
- Born: May 15, 1934; Jersey City, New Jersey, U.S.
- Died: May 11, 2025 (aged 90)
- Other name: Johnny Sausage
- Occupation: Mobster
- Known for: Captain in the Genovese crime family
- Allegiance: Genovese crime family
- Convictions: Racketeering, extortion (2005)
- Penalty: 2-6 years' imprisonment

John Barbato (May 15, 1934 – May 11, 2025), nicknamed "Johnny Sausage", was an American mobster and captain in the Genovese crime family. Barbato also served as acting underboss from 2003 to 2005.

== Career and exclusion from New Jersey ==
A distant cousin of Genovese crime family mob boss Frank Costello and cousin to Genovese crime family capo Willie Moretti, Barbato had reportedly been an associate of the Genovese crime family since the 1940s. At the time, his criminal record included convictions of four counts of bookmaking in the 1950s and 1960s, plus a conviction for robbery in 1963.

Sometime in the late 1970s, Barbato became the personal bodyguard and chauffeur for Genovese crime family underboss and Brooklyn faction leader Venero "Benny Eggs" Mangano. After being recognized as a "made member" or soldier since the 1970s, Barbato was officially excluded from the state of New Jersey on August 11, 1987.

Barbato was a distant cousin of the first wife of singer/actor Frank Sinatra, Nancy Barbato (Nancy Sinatra Sr.).

== Indictments and guilty plea ==
In 2005, Barbato was indicted on federal racketeering charges and racketeering conspiracy, which included murder conspiracy, extortion, loansharking and witness tampering. U.S. law enforcement charged him with operating criminal activities in the Brooklyn section as well as associating with then-current family acting boss Dominick "Quiet Dom" Cirillo and fellow captains Lawrence "Little Larry" Dentico and Anthony "Tico" Antico. Federal and state authorities alleged that Barbato was a "capo" (or captain) in the Genovese crime family.

The indictment alleged that Barbato was included in a panel since the late 1990s of powerful family capos on how to corrupt labor and construction unions in New York and New Jersey through bribery and extorting their locals in order to achieve influence with companies operating in those areas. Barbato, Cirillo and Antico were even charged with murder conspiracy, as they reputedly plotted to murder an important witness who had helped building the racketeering case against the defendants.

Following the arrests of Barbato and three others, The New York Times reported:

'With these arrests, law enforcement has effectively dismantled the present leadership of the Genovese family,' the United States attorney in Brooklyn, Roslynn R. Mauskopf, said in a statement announcing the indictments of the men. Prosecutors charged that the men took over the administration of the Genovese family business when their leader, Vincent Gigante, went to jail in 1997. The men, prosecutors said, continued the family's involvement 'in crimes designed to enrich its members,' including extortion, loan sharking and fraud.

The New York Daily News reported that Barbato and the others were "allegedly members of the Westside Crew, a ruling panel that runs the crime family in the absence of imprisoned Genovese boss Vincent (Chin) Gigante." Federal Bureau of Investigation Acting Assistant Director John Klochan said at the time: "Our hope is that the indictment will serve as their retirement papers."

On October 18, 2005, Barbato entered a guilty plea, admitting to his participation in an organized crime family and two acts of extortion conspiracy.

Although he admitted to membership in a crime family, he did not name the Genovese family or acknowledge being a capo. Observers of organized crime noted that there was little precedent for this type of admission, as it was contrary to the "rules" that Mafia members had formerly lived by. He was sentenced to two to six years in prison.

== Release from prison ==
John Barbato was released from prison at age 74 on July 3, 2008.

== Death ==
Barbato died on May 11, 2025, at the age of 90.

American Mafia
Preceded by Michael "Mickey Dimino" Generoso	Genovese crime family Acting underboss 2003–2005	Succeeded by Venero Mangano as underboss
