= Anthony Antico =

American mobster

- Born: September 6, 1935; Brooklyn, New York, U.S.
- Died: December 23, 2020 (aged 85); Staten Island, New York, U.S.
- Other names: "Tico"; "Big Nose"
- Occupation: Mobster
- Allegiance: Genovese crime family
- Convictions: Extortion (2005); Racketeering, conspiracy, extortion, illegal gambling (2010)
- Penalty: 2 years and six months' imprisonment 9 years' imprisonment

Anthony "Tico" Antico (/ɑːnˈtiːkoʊ/; September 6, 1935 - December 23, 2020) was an American mobster and a reputed member of the Genovese crime family. In the mid-2000s he served on a ruling committee along with Dominick Cirillo, Lawrence Dentico and John Barbato.

In 2005, Antico was indicted on federal racketeering charges and racketeering conspiracy, which included murder conspiracy, extortion, loansharking and witness tampering. Law enforcement identified Antico as a captain in the Genovese family, operating criminal activities in Brooklyn and Manhattan, as well as associating with then acting boss Dominick "Quiet Dom" Cirillo and captains Lawrence "Little Larry" Dentico and John "Johnny Sausage" Barbato, the indictment claimed that Antico was included in a panel since the late 1990s of powerful Genovese family capos who decided to corrupt labor and construction unions in New York and New Jersey through bribing and extorting their locals in order to achieve influence with companies operating in those areas. Antico, Cirillo and Barbato were charged with murder conspiracy, as they reputedly plotted to murder an important prosecution witness.

On October 19, 2005, Antico pleaded guilty to lesser extortion charges. On March 4, 2006, Antico was sentenced to 30 months in prison. He was released from prison on June 22, 2007.

On July 29, 2010, Antico was convicted of racketeering for running a mob social club on Staten Island and conspiracy to extort money from a race track winner. However, he was acquitted of extorting a bagel shop and ordering the robbery of Staten Island jeweler Louis Antonelli, which resulted in Antonelli's shooting death. Antico was sentenced to nine years in prison, a stiff sentence because the judge ruled that the testimony of government witness Salvatore Maniscalco tying Antico to the heist was credible and should be factored in the sentence.

Antico was imprisoned at the Butner Federal Medical Center (FMC) in Butner, North Carolina and was released on June 12, 2018.

Antico died on December 23, 2020, in Staten Island, New York aged 85.
