= Louis Guss =

American actor

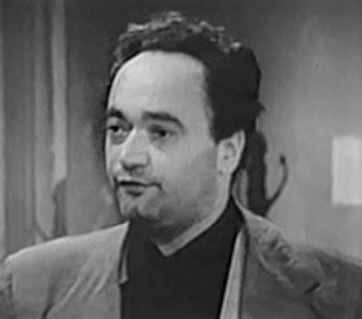
- Louis Guss in the TV series Decoy, episode Blind Date, 1958
- Born: January 4, 1918; New York City, New York, United States
- Died: September 29, 2008 (aged 90); New York City, New York, US
- Occupation: American actor
- Years active: 1938–2006

Louis Guss (January 4, 1918 – September 29, 2008) was an American character actor with a long line of screen credits, having appeared in hundreds of TV series, feature films and stage productions, specializing in blue-collar ethnic roles, over a five decade career. He is perhaps best known for his roles as Don Zaluchi in The Godfather (1972), Joseph Magliocco in Crazy Joe (1974), Raymond Capomaggi in Moonstruck (1987), Nathan Grodner in The Yards (2000), and Jerry "the Hammer" Fungo in The Crew (2000).

Guss was born in New York City on January 4, 1918.

His last role was in Sidney Lumet's Find Me Guilty in 2006.

Broadway plays in which Guss appeared included The Girl on the Via Flaminia (1954), Handful of Fire (1958), One More River (1960), Once There Was a Russian (1961), The Night of the Iguana (1961), Mother Courage and Her Children (1963), Arturo Ui (1963), Diamond Orchid (1965), Flora, The Red Menace (1965), But, Seriously (1969), Gandhi (1970), and Captain Brassbound's Conversion (1972).

== Death ==
Guss died at the age of 90 in 2008 from natural causes.

== Partial filmography ==
- Love with the Proper Stranger (1963) – Flooey (uncredited)
- The Godfather (1972) – Don Zaluchi (uncredited)
- The Laughing Policeman (1973) – Gus Niles
- Crazy Joe (1974) – Magliocco
- The Super Cops (1974) – Police Desk Sergeant (uncredited)
- Harry and Tonto (1974) – Dominic
- Lepke (1975) – Max Rubin
- Lucky Lady (1975) – Bernie
- No Deposit, No Return (1976) – Freddie
- Nickelodeon (1976) – Dinsdale
- Fun with Dick and Jane (1977) – Phone Co. Customer
- New York, New York (1977) – Frankie Harte Band Member
- H.O.T.S. (1979) – Bugs Benny
- Willie & Phil (1980) – Mr. D'Amico
- Highlander (1986) – Newsvendor
- Sno-Line (1986) – Gus
- Seize the Day (1986) – Rubin
- Vasectomy: A Delicate Matter (1986) – Grandpa Ragon
- Moonstruck (1987) – Raymond Cappomaggi
- American Blue Note (1989) – Abe Katz
- Slaves of New York (1989) – Vardig
- Used People (1992) – Uncle Normy
- The Cemetery Club (1993) – Ed Bonfigliano
- Night Falls on Manhattan (1996) – Court Clerk
- A Wake in Providence (1999) – Uncle Guy
- Two Family House (2000) – Donato
- Girlfight (2000) – Don
- The Yards (2000) – Nathan Grodner
- Pedestrian (2000)
- The Crew (2000) – Jerry 'The Hammer' Fungo
- A Tale of Two Pizzas (2003) – Emilio
- Find Me Guilty (2006) – Court Clerk (final film role)
