= The Offer =

2022 biographical drama miniseries

- Release poster
- Genre: Biographical drama
- Created by: Michael Tolkin
- Developed by: Michael Tolkin; Nikki Toscano
- Starring: Miles Teller; Matthew Goode; Dan Fogler; Burn Gorman; Colin Hanks; Giovanni Ribisi; Juno Temple
- Country of origin: United States
- Original language: English
- No. of episodes: 10

Production
- Executive producers: Miles Teller; Dexter Fletcher; Leslie Greif; Albert S. Ruddy; Michael Tolkin; Nikki Toscano; Michael Scheel
- Producer: Dalia Ibelhauptaitė
- Cinematography: Salvatore Totino; Elie Smolkin
- Editors: Matt Barber; David Trachtenberg; Tanya M. Swerling
- Running time: 51–68 minutes
- Production companies: DxD Films; The White Mountain Company; Black Mass Productions; Paramount Television Studios

Original release
- Network: Paramount+
- Release: April 28 – June 16, 2022

The Offer is a 2022 American biographical drama television miniseries created by Michael Tolkin and developed by Tolkin and Nikki Toscano for Paramount+. The series follows the development and production of Francis Ford Coppola's landmark gangster film The Godfather (1972) for Paramount Pictures. Miles Teller, Matthew Goode, Giovanni Ribisi, Colin Hanks, Dan Fogler, Juno Temple, and Burn Gorman all star. It premiered on April 28, 2022, and ran 10 episodes through June 16.

== Premise ==
Time magazine has summarized the series stating that it: "tells the chaotic true story behind the making of Coppola’s 1972 masterpiece The Godfather."

== Cast ==
=== Main ===
- Miles Teller as Albert S. Ruddy
- Matthew Goode as Robert Evans
- Dan Fogler as Francis Ford Coppola
- Burn Gorman as Charles Bluhdorn
- Colin Hanks as Barry Lapidus
- Giovanni Ribisi as Joe Colombo
- Juno Temple as Bettye McCartt

=== Recurring ===
- Nora Arnezeder as Françoise Glazer
- Patrick Gallo as Mario Puzo
- Frank John Hughes as Frank Sinatra
- Michael Rispoli as Tommy Lucchese
- Jake Cannavale as Caesar
- Lou Ferrigno as Lenny Montana
- Meredith Garretson as Ali MacGraw
- Anthony Skordi as Carlo Gambino
- Josh Zuckerman as Peter Bart
- Anthony Ippolito as Al Pacino
- James Madio as Carmine
- Paul McCrane as Jack Ballard
- Stephanie Koenig as Andrea Eastman
- Danny Nucci as Mario Biaggi
- Derrick Baskin as Nicky Barnes
- Joseph Russo as Joe Gallo
- Branden Williams as Gianni Russo
- Justin Chambers as Marlon Brando
- Carmine Giovinazzo as Sonny Grosso
- Geoffrey Arend as Aram Avakian
- Eric Balfour as Dean Tavoularis
- Maya Butler as Diane Keaton
- Damian Conrad-Davis as James Caan
- Derek Magyar as Robert Duvall
- Nick Pupo as John Cazale
- Zack Schor as Fred Gallo
- Cynthia Aileen Strahan as Talia Shire
- T. J. Thyne as Gordon Willis

=== Guest ===
- Lola Glaudini as Candida Donadio
- Kyle S. More as Bernard Fein
- Billy Magnussen as Robert Redford
- Kirk Acevedo as Special Agent Hale
- Michael Landes as Vic Damone
- Louis Mandylor as Mickey Cohen
- Ross McCall as Moran
- Andrew Child as New York Dancer
- Lisa Dobbyn as Morgana King
- Charlie Heydt as James T. Aubrey
- Dawn Joyal as Anna Hill Johnstone
- Michael Gandolfini as Andy Calhoun
- Aimee Carrero as Rosie Molina
- Lynn Adrianna Freedman as Madolina Colombo
- Ian Michaels as Robert Towne
- Allen Marsh as Alvin Sargent
- Sole Bovelli as Simonetta Stefanelli
- Jake Regal as Arthur Hiller
- Brandon Sklenar as Burt Reynolds
- Dave Shalansky as Henry Kissinger

== Episodes ==
No.	Title	Directed by	Written by	Original release date
1	"A Seat at the Table"	Dexter Fletcher	Michael Tolkin	April 28, 2022
In 1965 at the Chateau Marmont, Rand Corporation employee Albert S. Ruddy meets and forms a bond with owner Francoise Glazer as well as encounters Sergeant Bilko actor Bernard Fein. Together, the pair successfully pitch the sitcom Hogan's Heroes to CBS, though Ruddy eventually departs the show. He convinces Robert Evans, head of production at Paramount Pictures, to take him on as a film producer. In New York City, struggling author Mario Puzo's The Godfather becomes a best seller and is optioned for film by Paramount. It is negatively received by the Italian-American community, in particular Frank Sinatra, as it is believed the Johnny Fontane character is based on him. Joe Colombo, one of the heads of the Five Families, begins a crusade to fight injustice towards Italian-Americans, founding the Italian-American Civil Rights League. Due to the success of the novel, rival studios such as Warner Bros. call Paramount to try and convince them to sell the film rights. Evans is able to convince Charles Bluhdorn to retain them. He tasks Ruddy to produce, who selects Puzo to adapt and Francis Ford Coppola to direct. To intimidate them into dropping the project, Colombo has Ruddy's car shot up by Mickey Cohen's men.
2	"Warning Shots"	Dexter Fletcher	Teleplay by : Michael Tolkin & Leslie Greif and Michael Tolkin & Nikki Toscano & Kevin J. Hynes; Story by : Michael Tolkin & Leslie Greif	April 28, 2022
Ruddy juggles problems trying to get the production on track, including Puzo and Coppola taking their time on the script, more intimidation from Colombo, studio executive Barry Lapidus interfering and insisting on changes to keep the budget low and dealing with the clashing casting ideals of the studio and Coppola. All agreeing on Vic Damone for the role of Johnny Fontane, they meet with him after he expresses interest and agrees to participate, though he later announces he will not do the film after being publicly intimidated during one of his shows. For the role of Michael Corleone, Coppola insists on Al Pacino, whom Ruddy promises to get despite being told by casting executive Andrea Eastman that Evans will never approve him. Evans goes to New York and instructs Lapidus to never interfere with him again. Ruddy meets with Congressman Mario Biaggi to be given permission to film in New York but is informed this will not be allowed. Evans is sent a dead rat in a copy of the novel by Colombo and he flees back to Los Angeles, where he learns he will be removed from his position at the end of the month. Ruddy is approached by Colombo's men, who take him to meet with Colombo.
3	"Fade In"	Adam Arkin	Michael Tolkin & Leslie Greif and Russell Rothberg & Mona Mira & Michael Tolkin	April 28, 2022
Colombo tells Ruddy that he will not allow the film to be made. Ruddy promises him that the film will be respectful and invites Colombo to read the script. Bettye hurriedly brings the unfinished script to Ruddy. With the promise that the word "mafia" will be eliminated from the script, Colombo gives his blessing. Ruddy, Bettye, and Coppola location scout a Staten Island home that they decide to use as the Corleone home. In Los Angeles, Evans ignores calls from Bluhdorn to concentrate on Paramount's slate of films. Bluhdorn finally gets hold of him and says he will not be fired, but Evans will be held responsible if Love Story and The Godfather flop. Glazer wants to help Ruddy with producing. She tries to insert herself into his business dealings, to the annoyance of Evans and Bettye. Due to the stress of his job being in jeopardy, Evans furiously rejects Pacino for the film, and he fumes over the long length of the script. Despite these troubles, Puzo excitedly informs the team that Marlon Brando, whom he wrote to, is interested in doing the film. In New York, Colombo contends with the release of Joe Gallo from prison.
4	"The Right Shade of Yellow"	Adam Arkin	Teleplay by : Michael Tolkin & Leslie Greif and Michael Tolkin & Nikki Toscano; Story by : Michael Tolkin & Leslie Greif	May 5, 2022
Tensions develop between Ruddy and Glazer due to his secrecy and him not wanting to produce films with her. Evans discourages Ruddy from casting the notoriously difficult Brando. Ruddy, Coppola and Puzo record a screen test with Brando, which Coppola shows to Bluhdorn. He gives his approval on the condition Brando work for scale and comply with the studio. Evans angrily tells Ruddy to never go behind his back again. Glazer leaves Ruddy and she returns to France. The production loses the Staten Island house location, upsetting Francis. The backlash from Sinatra, Biaggi, and the Italian-American community grows. Bluhdorn and Lapidus use this unrest to appoint a co-producer to rein in Ruddy. With Evans' support, Ruddy remains the sole producer. Ruddy is unnerved when he witnesses Colombo and his men aggressively intimidate the Staten Island homeowner into allowing the film to use the location. Ruddy convinces Bluhdorn to approve casting Pacino, again going behind Evans' back. Evans is furious and orders the role of Sonny Corleone must be played by James Caan, to which Ruddy agrees. Unfortunately, Ruddy and Eastman learn that Pacino has signed onto a comedy film for MGM and can no longer participate.
5	"Kiss the Ring"	Colin Bucksey	Teleplay by : Michael Tolkin; Story by : Michael Tolkin & Leslie Greif and Michael Tolkin	May 12, 2022
Gallo launches his crusade against Colombo, killing his man Carmine and stealing his truck. Ruddy asks Evans to negotiate with MGM to get Pacino out of his commitment. Finally convinced, Evans complies and makes the deal. Through this, he is tipped off about Gulf & Western potentially selling Paramount. Biaggi continues to cause issues for the production, having the filming permits pulled for their locations. Colombo, meeting with the congressman in regards to the FBI raiding him, gets the permits reinstated. The budget, despite the cast working for scale and leveraging incentives, is still over the $4 million price, so Ruddy and Coppola meet with Bluhdorn and get the budget increased to $6 million. To mark the beginning of production, the cast are assembled for a dinner where they stage a performance to showcase their characters. Lapidus confirms to Evans that Paramount is being considered for sale. Colombo summons Ruddy to an IARCL event endorsing Biaggi for re-election and blindsides Ruddy by announcing the League and Gulf & Western reached a deal for the earnings from the premiere of the film to be donated to League hospitals.
6	"A Stand Up Guy"	Colin Bucksey	Nikki Toscano	May 19, 2022
The news of Gulf & Western working with Colombo reaches Bluhdorn and Evans, prompting Bluhdorn to fast track offloading Paramount and firing Ruddy from the film. McCartt, despite being disrespected by Ruddy, goes to Colombo to tell him about the firing. He immediately moves to cause trouble for the production as a means to have Ruddy reinstated. While meeting to vote on selling Paramount on a discount to a Texan investor, Evans interrupts and give a speech to have them reconsider. It is decided they will not sell Paramount after Bluhdorn changes his mind. Coppola informs Bluhdorn about the mafia interference and Ruddy is rehired, allowing him to return and witness the completion of the first day of production. In response to Gallo, Colombo orders an attack against him and Nicky Barnes.
7	"Mr. Producer"	Gwyneth Horder-Payton	Kevin J. Hynes	May 26, 2022
Lapidus continues to raise problems with the production, working to have Pacino fired from the film and conspiring with Paramount executive Jack Ballard and film editor Aram Avakian to deliver unfinished dailies to Bluhdorn to get Coppola fired too. On set, Coppola has creative conflicts with cinematographer Gordon Willis over the lighting, the prop horse head is too fake looking to use and due to the death of the initial actor hired, one of Colombo's men Lenny Montana is cast to play Luca Brasi. Ruddy, seeing that dailies are being produced to Bluhdorn without his knowledge, makes it so he and Coppola approve their screening. To convince Bluhdorn about Pacino's acting ability, they bring him to set for the filming of the restaurant murder scene, which greatly impresses him. McCartt facilitates getting a real dead horse's head for the production and once Ruddy learns it is Ballard and Avakian leaking dailies, he has them fired from the film. Ruddy bonds more with Colombo, and is stunned upon witnessing Colombo be shot at a League rally by one of Gallo's men, Gallo receiving the blessing for the hit from Carlo Gambino. Evans' marriage to Ali MacGraw comes to an end.
8	"Crossing That Line"	Gwyneth Horder-Payton	Russell Rothberg	June 2, 2022
With Colombo in the hospital, Gallo moves to dissolve the League and to assume control over the film. An incident during filming where Gianni Russo actually hit Talia Shire prompts Ruddy to have Caan beat him up for real during filming of a scene. Ruddy makes several shifts to the budget to accommodate filming in Sicily, but when Gallo accosts Ruddy in his hotel room and strongarms him for money, the filming is again put in jeopardy. Having become distracted in his work and constantly absent from the production, Evans is confronted by Ruddy during the New York filming wrap party, and Evans makes a drunken scene in front of Bluhdorn. Before Ruddy decides to give in to his demands, he learns that Gallo was shot to death at his birthday dinner in retaliation for his attack on Colombo.
9	"It's Who We Are"	Adam Arkin	Nikki Toscano & Mona Mira	June 9, 2022
The crew arrives in Italy, travelling to the town of Corleone to film. However Ruddy hurries them out once realizing he would have to work with the Italian mafia, with the crew relocating to Forza d'Agrò. Evans continues to deteriorate and Bluhdorn sends Lapidus to assume his duties at Paramount. Upon learning this, Ruddy returns and convinces Bluhdorn to let him talk to Evans. After several attempts, Ruddy enters his home through a window and has a heart-to-heart conversation with Evans, but this does not sway him. Lapidus makes numerous changes to the studio's slate and instructs Coppola to cut 30 minutes from the film. Bluhdorn arrives in Los Angeles to officially remove Evans, but during a marketing meeting, Evans returns. Bluhdorn still offers Lapidus the chance to take over but Lapidus concedes Evans should remain, with Evans allowing the film to retain the cut 30 minutes. McCartt reveals to Ruddy she wants to leave to become a talent agent. Ruddy arranges for a screening of the film for the members of Colombo's crew and visits Colombo in the hospital.
10	"Brains and Balls"	Adam Arkin	Nikki Toscano & Russell Rothberg & Michael Tolkin	June 16, 2022
With the film debuting in March 1972 following the success of Cabaret, Lapidus proposes that they block book opening weekend. Evans meets with MacGraw, hoping to rekindle their marriage, but she serves him with divorce papers. MacGraw does join Evans for the premiere. Ruddy, seeking his next project, writes a script for The Longest Yard and gets Burt Reynolds to sign on. But Ruddy cannot get Evans to hear his pitch, as Evans wants him to concentrate on The Godfather sequel. The Godfather is a critical and commercial success, accumulating multiple nominations at the Academy Awards. Evans brokers a deal with Bluhdorn to become Executive Vice President of Production to also produce films, while Ruddy invests in McCartt's talent agency. With The Godfather winning Best Picture and The Godfather Part II in development, Ruddy tells Evans he will not participate on Part II to get The Longest Yard made, which Evans allows.

== Production ==
The project was announced in September 2020 to air on Paramount+, and for the story to be described from the perspective of producer Albert S. Ruddy. Armie Hammer was cast to play him in December 2020, but dropped out the following month; he was replaced by Miles Teller in May 2021. In April 2021, Dexter Fletcher was hired to direct several episodes. Matthew Goode, Giovanni Ribisi, Colin Hanks, Dan Fogler and Juno Temple joined the production in June, and in July, Burn Gorman joined as Charles Bluhdorn. Justin Chambers has a recurring role as Marlon Brando. In October, Eric Balfour, Michael Gandolfini and Zack Schor joined the cast, with Balfour playing production designer Dean Tavoularis.

Filming for the series began in July 2021 but was paused on July 29 due to a positive COVID-19 test. On August 23, 2021, it was reported that plans to film at the Chateau Marmont hotel in Los Angeles between August 25 and 27 were scrapped after learning about a labor dispute there. The miniseries was released on April 28, 2022, with the first three episodes of the ten-episode miniseries available immediately and the rest debuting on a weekly basis on Thursdays.

== Reception ==
On the review aggregator website Rotten Tomatoes, 57% of 54 critics' reviews are positive, with an average rating of 6.2/10. The website's consensus reads: "Overstuffed with unnecessary subplots and cloying winks at showbiz history, this is an Offer you can refuse." Metacritic, which uses a weighted average, assigned a score of 48 out of 100 based on 28 critics, indicating "mixed or average reviews".

Accolades received by The Offer
Year	Award	Category	Nominee	Result	Ref.
2023	Critics' Choice Awards	Best Limited Series	The Offer	Nominated	
2023	Critics' Choice Awards	Best Supporting Actor in a Limited Series or Movie Made for Television	Matthew Goode	Nominated	
2023	Critics' Choice Awards	Best Supporting Actress in a Limited Series or Movie Made for Television	Juno Temple	Nominated	
2023	Satellite Awards	Best Actress in a Supporting Role in a Series, Miniseries, Limited Series, or Motion Picture Made for Television	Juno Temple	Won	

== See also ==
- 1970s nostalgia
