= Guilford Glazer =

American real estate developer and philanthropist (1921-2014)

- Born: July 17, 1921; Knoxville, Tennessee, U.S.
- Died: December 23, 2014 (aged 93); Beverly Hills, California, U.S.
- Education: Knoxville High School; George Washington University
- Occupations: Real estate developer philanthropist
- Spouse(s): Francoise Glazer (m. 1956; div. 1965) Diane Pregerson (m. 1967)
- Children: 2

Guilford Glazer (July 17, 1921 – December 23, 2014) was an American real estate developer and philanthropist.

== Early life ==
Glazer was born to a Jewish immigrant family on July 17, 1921 in Knoxville, Tennessee, one of eight children born to Ida (née Bresoff) and Oscar Aaron Glazer. His father was a welder. He grew up in the Fourth and Gill neighborhood and attended Knoxville High School, graduating in 1938. He enrolled at George Washington University with the intention of becoming an engineer, but left after his father died in 1939. In 1941, after the United States entered World War II, he joined the Navy where he worked in ship construction.

== Career ==
After the war ended, he returned to East Tennessee and took over the family-owned welding shop. He owned 30% of the company with his two brothers, Jerome S. Glazer and Louis A. Glazer (owning 25% each) and his brother-in-law, I. B. Cohen (with a 20% share) as partners. In 1955, I.B Cohen sold his share back in Glazer Steel to the three brothers with Guilford's interest increasing to 38.12% and Jerome's and Louis's share becoming 30.94% each. Under his management, the business grew to become a major steel fabrication business, the Glazer Steel Corporation with production facilities in Knoxville and New Orleans. Glazer Steel fabricated bridges and other structures for Kaiser Aluminum, the government of France, and other customers around the world.

While still the Chairman of Glazer Steel Corporation, Guilford entered the real estate development business in Knoxville. The first building that Glazer developed was Shelbourne Towers near the University of Tennessee campus in Knoxville, described as Knoxville's "first high-rise apartment building". His entry into the real estate development business occurred in 1951, when the U.S. Atomic Energy Commission selected a company headed by Glazer to build a shopping center in Oak Ridge, Tennessee. A shortage of steel resulting from the Korean War delayed construction, but the center opened in 1955. In 1960, Glazer moved to the Los Angeles metropolitan area, where in the 1970s he developed the Del Amo Fashion Center, which was at one time the world's largest shopping mall. His company was also involved in shopping center development throughout the United States. He later sold off most of his real estate holdings. The Del Amo Fashion Center was sold to the Mills Corporation in 2003.

Thanks to his success, Glazer amassed a considerable fortune. His name appeared regularly on the Forbes magazine "List of 400 Richest Americans"; in 2005 his net worth was estimated at $900 million.

== Philanthropy ==
In later years, he focused on philanthropic causes, including the support of Israel. The business school of the Ben-Gurion University of the Negev, established in 1995 and now named the Guilford Glazer Faculty of Business and Management, was named after him in 2007 following a major donation. In 2008, Pepperdine University opened the Diane and Guilford Glazer Institute of Jewish Studies, funded by donations from the Glazers.

== Personal life ==
Glazer had been married twice. His first marriage to Francoise Glazer ended in divorce in 1965; they had two children: Emerson Glazer (born 1957) and Erika Glazer (born 1959). He resided in Beverly Hills, California, with his second wife, Diane Pregerson.

== Death ==
Glazer died on December 23, 2014, in Beverly Hills, California. His funeral was held at the Wilshire Boulevard Temple.
