= Joe Gallo =

American mobster (1929–1972)

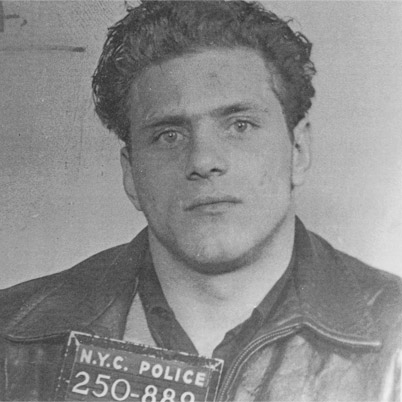
- Gallo mugshot taken by the New York City Police Department, 1961.
- Born: Joseph Gallo; April 7, 1929; New York City, New York, U.S.
- Died: April 7, 1972 (aged 43); New York City, New York, U.S.
- Cause of death: Murder by gunshots
- Other name: "Crazy Joe"
- Occupation: Mobster
- Spouse(s): Jeffie Lee Boyd (m. 196?; div. 196?), (m. 1971; div. 1971) Sina Essary (m. 1972)
- Children: 1
- Relatives: Albert Gallo (brother); Larry Gallo (brother)
- Allegiance: Colombo crime family
- Conviction: Extortion (1961)
- Penalty: Seven to 14 years imprisonment; served 10 years

Joseph Gallo (April 7, 1929 – April 7, 1972), also known as "Crazy Joe", was an American mobster and soldato (soldier) often characterized as a de facto caporegime (captain) in the Colombo crime family of New York City.

Diagnosed with schizophrenia in his youth, Gallo became an enforcer in the Profaci crime family (forerunner to the Colombo family) and formed his own crew with his brothers, Larry and Albert. In 1957, Joe Profaci allegedly asked the Gallo crew to murder Albert Anastasia, the boss of what was to become the Gambino crime family; Anastasia was later murdered at a barbershop in Midtown Manhattan. In 1961, the Gallo brothers kidnapped four of Profaci's top men: underboss Joseph Magliocco, Frank Profaci (Joe Profaci's brother), captain Salvatore Musacchia and soldier John Scimone, demanding a more favorable financial scheme for the hostages' release. After a few weeks of negotiation, Profaci and his consigliere, Charles "the Sidge" LoCicero, made a deal with the Gallos and secured the peaceful release of the hostages. This incited the First Colombo War.

In 1961, Gallo was sentenced to seven to fourteen years' imprisonment for conspiracy and extortion. During his incarceration, Magliocco took over the family in the wake of Profaci's death, leading to a murder attempt against Carmine Persico by the remaining Gallo brothers in 1963. Patriarca family boss Raymond L.S. Patriarca negotiated a peace agreement between the two factions, but Gallo later refused to abide by the agreement, citing his imprisonment. After Gallo's release from prison in 1971, a peace offering of $1,000 was made by boss Joseph Colombo, but Gallo demanded $100,000; Colombo refused. On June 28, 1971, at an Italian-American Civil Rights League rally in Columbus Circle, Colombo was shot three times by an African-American gunman, who was immediately killed by Colombo's bodyguards; Colombo survived the shooting but was paralyzed. Although many in the Colombo family blamed Gallo for the shooting, police eventually concluded that the gunman acted alone after they had questioned Gallo.

The Colombo family leadership was convinced that Gallo ordered their boss' murder after his falling out with the family, inciting the Second Colombo War. On April 7, 1972, at around 4:30 a.m., Gallo was shot dead at Umbertos Clam House in Little Italy, Manhattan, while celebrating his 43rd birthday. Although differing accounts of who the killer or killers were have been reported by various sources over the years, "the case officially remains unsolved."

== Early life ==
Joe Gallo was born on April 7, 1929, in the Red Hook neighborhood of Brooklyn in New York City. His parents were Umberto and Mary Gallo. A bootlegger during Prohibition, Umberto invested his earnings into a loan-sharking racket and did little to discourage Gallo and his two brothers, Larry and Albert, from participating in local criminal activity.

Although he would remain deeply entwined with South Brooklyn in the popular imagination, and often frequented the area as a youth because of familial ties, Gallo was actually raised in Kensington (then customarily characterized as a subsection of Flatbush), where his family owned and operated Jackie's Charcolette, a greasy spoon at 108 Beverley Road. As late as 1964, a United States Senate dossier on organized crime identified the family's home at 639 East 4th Street as Gallo's permanent residence. (Note: By 1972, the Gallo family had relocated across the street to a larger abode at 652 East 4th Street, which was operated as a rooming house.) Gallo completed his primary education at P.S. 179 in Kensington before dropping out of the Brooklyn High School of Automotive Trades in Williamsburg at the age of 16.

Shortly thereafter, Gallo sustained head trauma in an automobile accident, resulting in the manifestation of a "nervous tic"; by this juncture, he and lifelong associates Peter "Pete the Greek" Diapoulas and Frank Illiano had begun to contemplate various criminal schemes while frequenting the Ace Pool Room on Church Avenue and a candy store on 36th Street and Fourteenth Avenue in nearby Borough Park. In 1949, after viewing the film Kiss of Death (1947), Gallo began mimicking Richard Widmark's gangster character "Tommy Udo" and reciting movie dialogue. After a 1950 arrest he was temporarily confined to Kings County Hospital Center, where he was diagnosed with schizophrenia. Albert Seedman, the head of New York City Police Department's Detective Bureau, called Gallo "that little guy with steel balls." Gallo's brothers Larry and Albert (the latter of whom had by now gained the street moniker "Kid Blast") were also his criminal associates.

Gallo's first wife – whom he married around 1960, divorced in the mid-1960s and then remarried in July 1971 – was Las Vegas showgirl Jeffie Lee Boyd. Later in 1971, Jeffie divorced Gallo again. The couple had one daughter, Joie. In March 1972, three weeks before his death, Gallo married 29-year-old actress Sina Essary. He became the stepfather of Sina's daughter, Lisa Essary-Gallo (born 1962).

== Early criminal career ==
Gallo started his adult criminal career as an enforcer and hitman for Joe Profaci in the Profaci crime family. In addition to helping to manage his father's loan-sharking business and Larry's vending machine and jukebox operations (with the latter often perceived as the "crown jewel" of the family's rackets), Gallo directly oversaw a variety of enterprises, including floating dice and high-stakes card games, extortion shakedowns and a numbers game. He maintained his headquarters at "The Dormitory," a three-story brick tenement at 51 President Street (within the boundaries of Brooklyn's contemporary Columbia Street Waterfront District) that previously housed the Gallo family's vending machine interests; there, he allegedly kept a pet lion named Cleo in the basement. Within a few years, Gallo secretly owned several Manhattan nightclubs and two sweatshops in the Garment District.

In 1957, Profaci allegedly asked Gallo and his crew to murder Albert Anastasia, the boss of what would later become the Gambino crime family. Anastasia's underboss, Carlo Gambino, wanted to replace him and asked Profaci for assistance. On October 25, Anastasia entered the barbershop at the Park Sheraton Hotel in Midtown Manhattan. As Anastasia relaxed in the barber's chair, two men—scarves covering their faces—rushed in, shoved the barber out of the way and killed Anastasia in a hail of bullets. The killers have never been conclusively identified, but Carmine Persico later claimed that he and Gallo had shot Anastasia, joking that he was part of Gallo's "barbershop quintet."

The following year, Gallo and his brothers were summoned to Washington, D.C., to testify before the McClellan Committee of the United States Senate on organized crime. While visiting Senate Counsel Robert F. Kennedy in his office, Gallo flirted with Kennedy's secretary and told Kennedy his carpet would be excellent for a dice game. On the witness stand, none of the brothers provided any useful information.

== First Colombo War ==
On February 27, 1961, the Gallo brothers kidnapped four of Profaci's top men: underboss Joseph Magliocco, Frank Profaci (Joe Profaci's brother), caporegime (captain) Salvatore Musacchia and soldato (soldier) John Scimone. Profaci himself eluded capture and flew to sanctuary in Florida. While holding the hostages captive, Larry and Albert sent Joe to California. The Gallos demanded a more favorable financial scheme for the hostages' release. Gallo wanted to kill one hostage and demand $100,000 before negotiations, but his brother Larry overruled him. After a few weeks of negotiation, Profaci and his consigliere, Charles "the Sidge" LoCicero, struck a deal with the Gallos and secured the peaceful release of the hostages.

However, Profaci had no intention of honoring this peace agreement. On August 20, 1961, he ordered the murders of Larry and Joseph "Joe Jelly" Gioielli, a member of the Gallo crew. Gunmen allegedly murdered Gioielli after inviting him to go fishing. Larry survived a strangulation attempt by Persico and Salvatore "Sally" D'Ambrosio at the Sahara Club in East Flatbush after a police officer intervened. The Gallos had been previously aligned with Persico against Profaci and his loyalists; they then began calling Persico "the Snake" after he had betrayed them. The gang war continued, resulting in nine murders and three disappearances. With the start of the war, the Gallo crew retreated to the Dormitory. Persico was indicted later in 1961 for the attempted murder of Larry, but the charges were dropped when Larry refused to testify.

In November 1961, Gallo was convicted of conspiracy and extortion for attempting to extort money from a businessman. On December 21 of that year, he was sentenced to seven to fourteen years in prison.

== Prison ==
While serving his sentence, Gallo was incarcerated at three New York state prisons: Green Haven Correctional Facility, Attica Correctional Facility and Auburn Correctional Facility. In 1962, when Gallo was serving time in Attica, his brothers Larry and Albert, along with five other members of the Gallo crew, rushed into a burning Brooklyn tenement near their hangout, the Longshore Rest Room, and rescued six children and their mother from a fire. The crew was briefly celebrated in the press.

While at Green Haven, Gallo befriended African-American drug trafficker Leroy "Nicky" Barnes. Gallo predicted a power shift in the Harlem drug rackets towards black gangs, and coached Barnes on how to upgrade his criminal organization. On August 29, 1964, Gallo sued the New York Department of Corrections, stating that corrections officers inflicted cruel and unusual punishment on him at Green Haven because Gallo allowed a black barber to cut Gallo’s hair. The prison commissioner characterized Gallo as a belligerent inmate and an agitator.

At Auburn, Gallo took up watercolor painting, became an avid reader and worked as an elevator operator in the prison's woodworking shop. During a prison riot there, Gallo rescued a severely wounded corrections officer from angry inmates. The officer later testified for Gallo at a parole hearing. According to Donald Frankos, a fellow inmate at Auburn, Gallo was "articulate and had excellent verbal skills, being able to describe gouging a man's guts out with the same eloquent ease that he used when discussing classical literature."

In May 1968, while Gallo was still in prison, his brother Larry died of cancer.

== Release from prison and Second Colombo War ==
The Profaci family went through a period of change during Gallo's incarceration. On June 7, 1962, after a long illness, Profaci died of cancer. Magliocco took over the family and continued the battle with Gallo's brothers. On May 19, 1963, Persico survived an assault by a Gallo hit team, although he was shot multiple times. Later that year, through negotiations with Patriarca family boss Raymond L.S. Patriarca, a peace agreement was reached between the two factions. Gallo later stated that the peace agreement did not apply to him because he was in prison when it was negotiated.

The Commission, the American Mafia's governing body, forced Magliocco to resign as boss after they discovered he helped formulate a plot to overthrow them. Joseph Colombo, an ally of Gambino, was named as the new Profaci family boss; the family was renamed the Colombo crime family. However, Colombo soon alienated Gambino with his establishment of the Italian-American Civil Rights League (IACRL) and the media attention that it entailed. Gallo was released from prison on April 11, 1971. His second wife, Sina, described him shortly after his release, saying he appeared extremely frail and pale,

He looked like an old man. He was a bag of bones. You could see the remnants of what had been a strikingly handsome man in his youth. He had beautiful features—beautiful nose, beautiful mouth and piercing blue eyes.

Gallo soon became a part of New York high society. His connection started when actor Jerry Orbach played the inept mobster Kid Sally Palumbo in the film The Gang That Couldn't Shoot Straight (1971), a role based loosely on Gallo. Following his release, Colombo and Joseph Yacovelli invited Gallo to a peace meeting with an offering of $1,000. Gallo reportedly told the family representatives that he was not bound by the 1963 peace agreement and demanded $100,000 to settle the dispute, which Colombo refused.

On June 28, 1971, at an IACRL rally in Columbus Circle, Colombo was shot three times, once being in the head, by an African-American gunman named Jerome A. Johnson; Johnson was immediately killed by Colombo's bodyguards. Colombo survived the shooting but was paralyzed until his death in May 1978. Although many in the Colombo family blamed Gallo for the shooting, police eventually concluded that Johnson was a lone gunman after they had questioned Gallo. Despite this finding, the Colombo leadership remained convinced that Gallo ordered the murder after his falling out with the family.

== Murder ==
On April 7, 1972, around 4:30 a.m., Gallo entered Umbertos Clam House in Manhattan's Little Italy to celebrate his 43rd birthday with his sister Carmella, his wife Sina, her daughter Lisa, his bodyguard Peter "Pete the Greek" Diapoulas and Diapoulas' girlfriend. Earlier that evening, the Gallo party had visited the Copacabana with Orbach and his wife, Marta, to see a performance by comedian Don Rickles and singer Peter Lemongello. Once at Umbertos, the Gallo party took two tables, with Gallo and Diapoulas facing the wall. Rickles and Lemongello declined Gallo's invitation to join them at Umbertos, possibly saving their lives.

Colombo associate Joseph Luparelli claimed he was sitting at the bar, unbeknownst to Gallo. When Luparelli saw Gallo, he claimed he immediately left Umbertos and walked to a Colombo hangout two blocks away. After contacting Yacovelli, Luparelli said he recruited Colombo associate Philip Gambino, Genovese soldier Carmine "Sonny Pinto" DiBiase and two other men – reputedly members of the Patriarca family – to kill Gallo due to their belief the Colombos had a contract on Gallo's life. Upon reaching Umbertos, Luparelli claimed he stayed in the car while the other four men went inside through the back door.

Between seafood courses, Luparelli asserted that the four gunmen walked into the dining room and opened fire with .32- and .38 caliber revolvers. Gallo swore and attempted to draw his handgun, but twenty shots were fired at him and he was hit in the back, elbow and buttock. After overturning a butcher block dining table, Gallo staggered to the front door. Witnesses claimed that he was attempting to draw fire away from his family. Diapoulas was shot once in the hip. The mortally wounded Gallo stumbled into the street and collapsed. He was taken in a police car to Beekman-Downtown Hospital, where he was pronounced dead at around 5:30 a.m.

Luparelli's account earned wide publicity but was met with skepticism by police. NYPD homicide detective Joe Coffey, who inherited the Gallo case from the original investigators, reported that eyewitness testimony and crime scene reconstruction led police to believe that Gallo was killed by a lone assailant. Coffey also asserted that police circulated a false story about three shooters to help screen information from supposed witnesses or informers: anyone who reported three gunmen rather than one was immediately deemed unreliable. Author Charles Brandt notes that "[Luparelli's] statement was never corroborated in a single detail" and resulted in no arrests. Brandt further speculates that Luparalli's confession was most likely disinformation ordered by the Colombo family with the intention of defusing tensions after the Gallo shooting. Umbertos was owned by associates of the Genovese crime family, which would normally imply the Genoveses had given their blessing to a killing on their territory, but Luparelli's account, that the shooting was a spontaneous unplanned act without approval from high-ranking mafiosi, took pressure off the feuding Colombo and Genovese families.

A differing but equally disputed account of the murder was offered by Frank Sheeran, a hitman and labor union boss. Shortly before his death in 2003, Sheeran claimed that he was the lone triggerman in the Gallo hit acting on orders from mobster Russell Bufalino, who felt that Gallo was drawing undue attention with his flashy lifestyle. Coffey and several other NYPD investigators are confident that Sheeran killed Gallo. Furthermore, an eyewitness at Umbertos on the night of the incident, later a New York Times editor who spoke on condition of anonymity, also identified Sheeran as the man she observed shooting Gallo. Jerry Capeci, a journalist and Mafia expert who was at Umbertos shortly after the shooting as a young reporter for the New York Post, later wrote that if he were "forced to make a choice" about who shot Gallo, Sheeran was the most likely culprit.

Bill Tonelli disputes the truthfulness of Sheeran's claim in his Slate article "The Lies of the Irishman," as does Harvard Law School professor Jack Goldsmith in "Jimmy Hoffa and 'The Irishman': A True Crime Story?" which appeared in The New York Review of Books. Former Colombo family captain Michael Franzese also disputes that Sheeran was the killer when reviewing the scene depicting the assassination in The Irishman, claiming that he knows "for a fact what happened there" based on his personal involvement with the Mafia at the time. Gallo's widow later stated that she remembered the attack involving multiple men, all of whom were short and appeared to be Italian. Sheeran, on the other hand, was of mixed Irish-Swedish descent and 6'4".

=== Aftermath ===
Gallo's funeral was held under police surveillance; his sister Carmella declared over his open coffin that "the streets are going to run red with blood, Joey!" Looking for revenge, Albert sent a gunman from Las Vegas to the Neapolitan Noodle restaurant in Manhattan, where Yacovelli, Alphonse Persico and Gennaro Langella were dining. However, the gunman did not recognize the mobsters and shot four innocent diners instead, killing two of them. After this assassination attempt, Yacovelli fled New York, leaving Persico as the new boss. The Colombo family, led by the imprisoned Persico, was plunged into a second internecine war, which lasted for several years, until a 1974 agreement allowed Albert and his remaining crew to join the Genovese family.

An increasingly paranoid Luparelli fled to California, then contacted the Federal Bureau of Investigation and reached a deal to become a government witness. He implicated the four gunmen in the Gallo murder. However, police could not bring charges against them; there was no corroborating evidence and Luparelli was deemed an unreliable witness. No one was ever charged in Gallo's murder.

In October 1975, the New York City Department of Water Resources began to replace the sewer on the "Gallo block" of President Street with a system designed to connect to a new sewage treatment plant in Red Hook. When a house at 21 President Street collapsed on December 3, 1975, all work on the project stopped for more than eighteen months, leaving an "open trench in the middle of the street, [...] braced with steel and filled with stagnant water" due to an ensuing pump failure; this compromised the foundations of every building on the block and the remaining buildings on an adjoining stretch of Carroll Street, compounding the effects of probable earlier damage stemming from the construction of the Brooklyn–Battery Tunnel and the depressed alignment of the Brooklyn–Queens Expressway on nearby Hicks Street.

Gallo crew member Frank DiMatteo has speculated that "lawyers and corrupt politicians [...] decided to turn the whole block into a stinking shithole until no one could live there anymore" in an effort to rid the area — by now convenient to the gentrifying enclaves of Carroll Gardens and Cobble Hill — of remaining Gallo associates. According to DiMatteo, only four buildings on the block were owned by the Gallo crew: "The rest were all owned by innocent people who'd had those buildings in their families for generations. [...] The Law didn't care. They got what they wanted." As many as thirty-three buildings on the block were subsequently condemned and replaced with new housing; none of the Gallo-era buildings are extant today.

== Gallo crew ==
- Albert "Kid Blast" Gallo – transferred to Genovese crime family in 1975
- Larry Gallo – died of cancer in 1968
- Frank "Punchy" Illiano – transferred to Genovese crime family in 1975, died in January 2014
- Bobby Boriello – transferred to Gambino crime family in 1972, murdered in 1991 on orders of Anthony Casso
- Nicholas Bianco – transferred to Patriarca crime family in 1963, died of natural causes in 1994
- Vic Amuso – transferred to Lucchese crime family, serving life in prison
- Joseph "Joe Pesh" Luparelli – entered witness protection program in 1972, current location unknown
- Joseph "Joe Jelly" Gioielli – murdered in 1961 by Profaci gunmen
- Carmine "the Snake" Persico – Colombo family boss, died in 2019 while serving 139-year sentence in prison
- Michael Rizzitello – transferred to Los Angeles crime family, died while incarcerated due to complications of cancer in 2005
- Peter ("Pete the Greek") Diapoulas
- John Cutrone – led breakaway faction from Gallo crew, murdered in 1976 by unknown gunmen
- Gerry Basciano – seceded from Gallo crew, murdered in 1976 by unknown gunmen
- Steve Cirrilo – murdered in 1974 by Cutrone gunmen
- Joseph Cardiello – defected to Profaci, murdered by Gallo gunmen on December 10, 1963
- Frank DiMatteo – magazine publisher and distributor
- Louis Mariani – murdered by Profaci gunmen on August 10, 1963
- Leonard "Big Lenny" Dello – died in 2009
- John Commarato
- Vincent “Chico” Regina
- Alfonso Serantonio
- Joseph Yancone
- Eugene LaGana
- Frank Balzano
- Sergio "SergForce" Gallo
- Dan 'Big Fish' Cantelliani
- Hugh "Apples" McIntosh – died in 1997

== In popular culture ==
Author Jimmy Breslin's 1969 book The Gang That Couldn't Shoot Straight was a fictionalized and satirical depiction of Gallo's war with the Profaci family. It was made into a 1971 feature film with Jerry Orbach playing Kid Sally Palumbo, a surrogate for Gallo.

After Gallo's murder, producer Dino De Laurentiis produced a more serious, but still fictionalized drama about Gallo titled Crazy Joe, released in 1974. Based on newspaper articles by reporter Nicholas Gage, the movie was directed by Carlo Lizzani and starred Peter Boyle as the title character.

Gallo is the main character in Bob Dylan's biographical, 12-verse ballad "Joey". The song appears in Dylan's 1976 album Desire. Dylan was criticized for overly romanticizing his life in the song.

Gallo was portrayed by Sebastian Maniscalco in the 2019 Martin Scorsese film The Irishman.

Gallo is portrayed in the 2019 film Mob Town by Kyle Stefanski.

In the Paramount+ 2022 TV Series The Offer, Gallo is portrayed by Joseph Russo.

== See also ==
- List of unsolved murders (1900–1979)
