= The Godfather Game =

Economic board game about the mafia

- Designers: Jody Porter
- Publishers: Family Games, Inc.
- Publication: 1971; 55 years ago
- Genres: Card game; Economic game
- Players: 2-4
- Playing time: 90 minutes
- Age range: 12+

The Godfather Game is an economic board game about the mafia designed by Jody Porter and published in 1971 by Family Games, Inc. Players play as mob bosses vying for control of rackets in various neighbourhoods to gain the most money and become the Godfather. Upon its release, it was heavily protested for its violent material targeted towards children and its depiction of stereotyped Italian gangsters.

== Gameplay ==
The Godfather Game is played with a deck of 52 cards, being cash cards, racket cards, "Breaks of the Game" cards, and fingerman cards, one of which is drawn at the start of each player's turn. If a Breaks of the Game card is pulled, a dice is rolled to determine whether the player must take a card from the "Good Break" or the "Bad Break" pile and either receive pay or be penalized. Cash and racket cards give the player the cash amount or territory stated on the card. A fingerman card permits a player to eliminate three of their opponents' men.

In addition, The Godfather Game is played on a game board divided into eight neighborhoods, which can each support one criminal racket. There are five possible rackets—bookmaking, extortion, bootlegging, loan sharking, and hijacking— which have a different cash value in each neighborhood. The racket operated in a neighborhood is decided by the first player to enter it.

On their turn, players can buy racketeers from the bank and place them on any vacant neighborhood squares up to a maximum of three. A player's men are eliminated when completely surrounded by another player's pieces. Similar to Go, control is achieved when more than half of the neighborhood is occupied or surrounded. The game ends when players have control of all neighborhoods, and the winner is the player with the most combined racket and monetary cash value.

== Publication history ==
The Godfather Game was published in 1971 with the slogan "a game for all the families." One edition came packaged in a unique plastic violin case indented with a Tommy Gun, which has since become a collectible item.

The release of the game was not well received. It was protested by New York mayor John Lindsay, the Italian-American Civil Rights League (IACRL), and The New York Times. Queens Assemblyman Joseph F. Lisa described the game as "a slur on the people of Manhattan... [and] a slur on the Italian-American community" for its marketing towards children and its stereotype of Italian gangsters. The IACRL succeeded in having Macy's stop selling The Godfather Game.

== Reception ==
David Pritchard, writing for Issue 7 of Games & Puzzles, said of The Godfather Game, "Whether you play the game well or badly, though, you will find that it can be very exciting with the advantage of changing hands on a clever play or the turn of a card," but went on to criticize the quality of the game's production. In Issue 4 of Moves, Martin Campion described the game as "tense", stating that "the tactics of the neighborhood battles are rather abstract, but the game as a whole is fairly realistic but Iimited."
