= Eleni (film) =

1985 American film directed by Peter Yates

- Theatrical release poster
- Directed by: Peter Yates
- Written by: Nicholas Gage; Steve Tesich
- Produced by: Nicholas Gage; Mark Pick; Nick Vanoff; Nigel Wooll (associate producer)
- Starring: Kate Nelligan; John Malkovich; Linda Hunt
- Cinematography: Billy Williams
- Edited by: Ray Lovejoy
- Music by: Bruce Smeaton
- Production company: CBS Theatrical Films
- Distributed by: Warner Bros. Pictures
- Release date: 1 November 1985
- Running time: 114 minutes
- Country: United States
- Language: English
- Budget: $12 million
- Box office: $305,102

Eleni is the 1985 film adaptation of the memoir Eleni by Greek-American journalist Nicholas Gage. Directed by Peter Yates with a screenplay by Steve Tesich, the film stars John Malkovich, Kate Nelligan, Linda Hunt and Glenne Headly.

== Plot ==
The film is told in a flashback format with Gage, now living in the United States, returning to his native Greece to solve the mystery of his mother's death when he was a child. The film looks back to the effect of the 1940s Greek Civil War in Lia – the remote Greek village of Gage's upbringing in the northwestern Greek region of Epirus; and in particular, the murder of his mother by communist guerrillas of the Democratic Army of Greece (ΔΣΕ).

== Cast ==
- Kate Nelligan as Eleni Gatzoyiannis
- John Malkovich as Nicholas Gage
- Linda Hunt as Katina
- Oliver Cotton as Katis
- Ronald Pickup as Spiro Skevis
- Rosalie Crutchley as Grandmother
- Glenne Headly as Joan Gage
- Dimitra Arliss as Ana

== Reception ==
Audiences polled by CinemaScore gave the film an average grade of "B+" on an A+ to F scale.

== See also ==
- Democratic Army of Greece
- OPLA
