= Ma Prem Hasya =

French-American follower of Rajneesh (1937-2014)

- Born: Françoise Wizenberg; April 4, 1937; Paris, France
- Died: August 19, 2014 (aged 77); United States
- Other names: Françoise Ruddy; Hasya-Françoise Ruddy
- Movement: Rajneesh movement
- Spouses: Guilford Glazer (m. 1956; div. 1964): Albert S. Ruddy (divorced); George Meredith (m. 1984)
- Children: 2 (with Glazer)

Ma Prem Hasya, or Françoise Ruddy or Hasya-Françoise Ruddy, (née Wizenberg; 4 April 1937 – 19 August 2014) was a French-American follower of Rajneesh who served as his personal secretary (or chief of staff) after Ma Anand Sheela. She is featured in archive footage in the Netflix documentary series, Wild Wild Country about Rajneesh, and is depicted in the 2022 miniseries The Offer about her then-husband Albert S. Ruddy's experience making The Godfather (1972).

== Early life and family ==
Françoise Wizenberg was born in Paris on April 4, 1937. She is the daughter of Icek/Izak (Yitzhak) Wizenberg, a Polish industrial worker who died in a World War II concentration camp, and Maria Wilczuk, also a Polish-born Jew. She survived the Holocaust under a false identity with a Christian family with whom her mother placed her. She was reunited with her mother, then living in France, at the age of 8. In the summer of 1948 she immigrated to Israel where she lived in an immigrant refugee camp in Netanya and then, according to sources, grew up in a kibbutz. In 1955, her mother grew anxious when Françoise was drafted into the Israel Defense Forces. According to sources her mother told her "I didn't save you from the Germans in order to lose you to the Arabs," and this in turn led to the family's preparations to emigrate to North America. The family eventually settled in New York after a brief sojourn in Canada.

In 1956 she married Guilford Glazer, a Jewish multimillionaire from Knoxville, Tennessee, and 16 years her senior. The marriage ended after eight years and produced two children. She later married her second husband, Albert S. Ruddy, a Montreal-born Jewish film producer who won the Academy Award for Best Picture for producing The Godfather. Françoise herself was involved in producing films, with The New York Times reporting in 1973 that she was producing an independent film adaptation of Seduction of the Minotaur by Anaïs Nin. The project was ultimately unrealized. Françoise and Albert later divorced.

== Rajneesh movement ==
She discovered the Rajneesh movement and Rajneesh's teachings during a trip to India. Hasya helped purchase the Oregon ranch that was developed into Rajneeshpuram. She later married Rajneesh's personal doctor, George Meredith. After the Rajneesh community left Oregon she traveled with Rajneesh on a worldwide "performance tour," visiting Nepal, Uruguay, Greece, Portugal, among other countries. Both eventually returned to Pune where she stayed until after the death of the Rajneesh. She returned to the United States in the same year, in 1990. She then lived between Los Angeles and Sedona, Arizona, where she started a spiritual center called the Mystery School and was also involved in the establishment of an Osho center in Los Angeles.

== Death ==
She had Parkinson's disease for the seven years preceding her death on August 19, 2014, at the home of her daughter, Erika Glazer. She is buried under the name of Francoise "Hasya" Ruddy in Hillside Memorial Park Cemetery, a Jewish cemetery in Los Angeles.

== In popular culture ==
- In The Offer (2022) played by Nora Arnezeder.
