= Frank Abbatemarco =

American mobster (1899–1959)

Francesco "Frankie Shots" Abbatemarco (July 4, 1899 – November 4, 1959) was an American mobster who served as a caporegime in the Profaci crime family of New York City. His murder is known for starting the First Colombo War, which continued on and off for twelve years.

== Early life ==
Abbatemarco was born in 1899 in Red Hook, Brooklyn, along with three other siblings, to Italian immigrants from Salerno who had moved to the United States around fifteen years before he was born. His older brother Michael "Mike Schatz" Abbatemarco (1894–1928) was also a Brooklyn gangster and close associate of Frankie Yale. His brother would be gunned down in 1928, following the killing of Yale.

Abbatemarco grew up with his neighbors, the Cardello brothers, who would later join the Colombo and Bonanno crime families, including future captain-turned informant Michael "Mikey Bat" Cardello. As a teenager his first job was at a local lumber yard in Brooklyn; several years later he was employed on Manhattan's lower west side for a teamster firm, where he worked as a truck driver.

He married Lucy Abbatemarco in 1921 and moved to the Park Slope neighborhood of Brooklyn. A year after they had a son named Anthony "Tony Shots" (1922–2005), who later became the underboss of the Colombo crime family in the 1970s.

== Criminal career ==
His first prison sentence was in October 1922, several months after the birth of his first son. He was sentenced to two years for conspiracy to sell morphine, alongside four other defendants; he served his time at the Atlanta federal prison. Abbatemarco became a soldier in the Profaci crime family in 1928, shortly after his brother was murdered.

He was arrested on August 27, 1931, for vagrancy, but was acquitted of all charges two weeks later. Another arrest would occur in 1932 in New Jersey but he was subsequently released. A year later in May 1934, he was arrested on an unknown charge and spent several days in police custody before being released.

Abbatemarco became a high level earner for his crime family during the 1930s, when he began operating several illegal gambling operations, including a lucrative numbers racket in South Brooklyn. By the 1940s Abbatemarco was elevated to the rank of captain and ran a crew that specialized in racketeering and burglary. In the early 1950s, he recruited teenager Carmine Persico, who would later serve as the family's boss from 1973 until his death in 2019.

On March 25, 1952, Abbatemarco, his son, Joe and Larry Gallo, and the 18-year old Persico were arrested by the Special Rackets Squad of the Brooklyn District Attorney's Office for racketeering-related charges. Their numbers racket was alleged to have earned them $2.5 million. Abbatemarco and his son were charged with conspiracy to operate a lottery and both pleaded guilty, though seven of the other defendants did not. He received a year in prison at Riker's Island Penitentiary.

== Death and legacy ==
On November 4, 1959, Abbatemarco was gunned down by assassins as he left a tavern owned by the Cardello brothers. Abbatemarco's downfall came after he and his crew stopped paying tribute to boss Joe Profaci. He claimed he was in debt, though he owned homes in New Jersey and Florida, and donated extravagantly to Catholic causes. He is buried at the Holy Cross Cemetery in Brooklyn.

The Gallo brothers are suspected to have carried out the murder in exchange for the promise of taking over Abbatemarco's rackets. Profaci, however, turned over those operations to his own relatives.

Abbatemarco's murder started the First Colombo War. His son Anthony went into hiding for two years and sought revenge against his father's killers. He assisted Profaci in killing Larry Gallo; however, he mistakenly shot a police officer and was charged with attempted murder. A month later, his cousin Joseph Magnasco was murdered. During the war, Anthony somewhat helped the Gallo brothers and changed sides several times in order to stay alive. The war ended after Joe Gallo was assassinated in 1972. Anthony Abbatemarco would later serve as underboss from 1973 to 1977.
