= Albert S. Ruddy =

American film producer and screenwriter (1930–2024)

- Ruddy at the 77th Academy Awards, 2005
- Born: Albert Stotland Ruddy; March 28, 1930; Montreal, Quebec, Canada
- Died: May 25, 2024 (aged 94); Los Angeles, California, U.S.
- Education: City College of New York; University of Southern California
- Occupations: Producer; screenwriter
- Years active: 1955–2021
- Spouse(s): Françoise Ruddy (divorced) Wanda McDaniel (m. 1981)
- Children: 2

Albert Stotland Ruddy (March 28, 1930 – May 25, 2024) was a Canadian-born American producer and screenwriter of film and television. He was known for producing the films The Godfather (1972) and Million Dollar Baby (2004), both of which won him the Academy Award for Best Picture. He also co-created the CBS sitcom Hogan's Heroes (1965–1971), and the action series Walker, Texas Ranger (1993–2001).

== Early life and education ==
Albert S. Ruddy was born to Ruth (née Rudnikoff) Hertz, a clothing designer, and Hy Stotland, who made uniforms, in Montreal, and raised in New York City and in Miami Beach, Florida, by his mother after his parents divorced when he was 6. Ruddy attended Brooklyn Technical High School before earning a scholarship to allow him to study chemical engineering at City College of New York. In 1956, he graduated from the University of Southern California (USC) with a degree in architectural design.

== Career ==
While at USC, Ruddy accompanied his girlfriend, who was employed on one of Roger Corman's first movies, to Palm Springs and ended up becoming the art director for The Beast with a Million Eyes (1955). For $50, he also designed a monster for the film.

Ruddy worked designing homes for a construction company, in Hackensack, New Jersey. This eventually led to him meeting Warner Brothers studio chief Jack L. Warner, who was impressed by Ruddy's knowledge and enthusiasm, and offered him a job in Los Angeles.

After a short stint at Warner Brothers, Ruddy moved on to become a programmer trainee at the RAND Corporation in Santa Monica, California. Returning to entertainment, Ruddy became a television writer at Universal Studios, but left when Marlon Brando Sr., father of the actor Marlon Brando, hired him to produce Wild Seed (1965), which was produced by Brando Jr.'s Pennebaker Productions.

With this film completed, Ruddy co-created with Bernard Fein Hogan's Heroes (CBS, 1965–1971), which was a critical and commercial success and ran for six seasons, despite network doubts about the suitability of WWII Nazis as comedic characters. As the sitcom wound down its run, Ruddy returned to films, producing two comedies: Little Fauss and Big Halsy (1970), about two motorcycle racers, and Making It (1971), about a sexually triumphant high school student who beds the gerontophobic wife of his gym teacher.

In 1972, he produced The Godfather, an adaptation of Mario Puzo's novel. During the development of The Godfather, Ruddy held secret meetings with Joseph Colombo, Colombo's son, and 1,500 delegates of the Italian-American Civil Rights League, which led to him gaining trust that the film would not stereotype or defame Italians. His numerous meetings with Anthony Colombo proved very productive in gaining trust from the League and the Colombo Family. The film was a massive commercial and critical success and is regarded as one of the best films ever made, as well as a landmark of the gangster genre. The film was nominated for eleven Academy Awards and won three – including Ruddy's first of two Oscars for Best Picture.

In 1974, Ruddy produced an adaptation of his own story treatment as The Longest Yard. The film, which has been described as "the first successful modern sports movie", was very successful financially and was subsequently remade twice with Ruddy as executive producer (as Mean Machine (2001) and as The Longest Yard (2005).

The following year, Ruddy produced director and animator Ralph Bakshi's satirical film Coonskin (1975). The film was extremely controversial and initially received negative reviews, but it would eventually earn critical acclaim. It is one of director Quentin Tarantino's favorite movies.

In 1976, he produced a western made-for-TV movie called The Macahans, which was subsequently developed into the series How the West Was Won (1977–1979).

For some time, Ruddy worked with writer-philosopher Ayn Rand to produce her 1957 epic novel Atlas Shrugged as a movie, the rights to which he purchased in the mid-1970s, but the movie never moved beyond the planning stage. Rand demanded unprecedented final script approval, which Ruddy agreed to. Her friends pointed out to Rand that Ruddy could shoot the approved script but still leave all her speeches on the cutting room floor. Rand asked for final editing approval, which neither Ruddy nor the director had the power to give her, so she responded by withdrawing her support from the film and vowing to ensure that Ruddy was never involved in any adaptation of her novel.

Ruddy then started to work with Hong Kong's Golden Harvest, producing The Cannonball Run (1981), his second picture with Burt Reynolds, a hugely successful film at the box office that received mixed reviews by critics. Ruddy next produced two action films, Death Hunt (1981) starring Lee Marvin and Charles Bronson, and Megaforce (1982). Ruddy returned to produce Cannonball Run II (1984), which was another commercial success for the Rat-Pack-prominent cast, and featured a guest appearance by Frank Sinatra. The film also features a rare on-screen cameo by Ruddy in a scene spoofing his film The Godfather, and including Godfather supporting actors Alex Rocco and Abe Vigoda.

In 1985, after leaving Golden Harvest, Ruddy and Andre Morgan set up the Ruddy Morgan Organization which produced films budgeted for the $8.5-16 million range, and arranged the financing and developing of "high-visibility" pictures the company placed up. Among their productions was the 1990 release Impulse, directed by Sondra Locke.

In the early 1990s, with Leslie Greif, Paul Haggis and Christopher Canaan, he co-created the successful series Walker, Texas Ranger. Also in 1992, he licensed the rights from Kevin McClory to make a James Bond television show, but Eon Productions blocked it, and winning the suit, ended any hopes of a television show.

In 2004, Ruddy produced Million Dollar Baby, which earned him his second Oscar for Best Picture. He shared the award with fellow producers Paul Haggis, Tom Rosenberg, and Clint Eastwood. Eastwood had presented Ruddy with the Best Picture Oscar for The Godfather over 30 years earlier.

In 2006, he hired Alana Ribble, an emerging talent at the time, and later described their professional relationship as "kismet." Their collaboration continued until his death in 2024.

In late 2015, it was announced that he had acquired the rights to Rand's Atlas Shrugged and would be making a movie for worldwide release.

In 2021, his daughter Alexandra Ruddy became co-principal at Albert S. Ruddy Productions.

== Personal life ==
Ruddy was married to and divorced from Francoise Ruddy, who was also Jewish. This was prior to her name change to Ma Prem Hasya as part of the Rajneeshpuram Commune in Central Oregon. Francoise saw him through the production of The Godfather, even lending her name to the production company title. His second marriage, to the actor Kaye Farrington, also ended in divorce.

Ruddy later married Wanda McDaniel, the mother of his two children Alexandra and John, and an executive vice president for the Italian designer Giorgio Armani, where she is credited with helping to make Armani successful.

Ruddy was the subject of a 2013 documentary, Tough Ain't Enough: Conversations with Albert S. Ruddy.

=== Death ===
Ruddy died at Ronald Reagan UCLA Medical Center in Los Angeles on May 25, 2024, at the age of 94, after a brief illness.

== In popular culture ==
In the 2022 biographical drama miniseries The Offer, which dramatizes the making of The Godfather and was executive produced by Ruddy, he is played by Miles Teller.

== Filmography ==
=== Film ===
Year	Title	Functioned as				Director	Notes	Ref.
Year	Title	Writer	Producer	Exec. producer	Other	Director	Notes	Ref.
1955	The Beast with a Million Eyes	No	No	No	Yes	David Kramarsky	Art Director	
1965	Wild Seed	No	Yes	No	No	Brian G. Hutton	Also wrote song "That's Why"	
1970	Little Fauss and Big Halsy	No	Yes	No	No	Sidney J. Furie		
1971	Making It	No	Yes	No	No	John Erman		
1972	The Godfather	No	Yes	No	No	Francis Ford Coppola		
1974	The Longest Yard	Story	Yes	No	No	Robert Aldrich		
1975	Coonskin	No	Yes	No	No	Ralph Bakshi		
1978	Matilda	Yes	Yes	No	No	Daniel Mann		
1981	The Cannonball Run	No	Yes	No	No	Hal Needham		
1981	Death Hunt	No	No	Yes	No	Peter R. Hunt		
1982	Megaforce	Yes	Yes	No	No	Hal Needham		
1984	Lassiter	No	Yes	No	No	Roger Young		
1984	Cannonball Run II	Yes	Yes	No	No	Hal Needham		
1989	Farewell to the King	No	Yes	No	No	John Milius		
1989	Speed Zone	No	No	Yes	No	Jim Drake		
1990	Impulse	No	Yes	No	No	Sondra Locke		
1992	Ladybugs	No	Yes	No	No	Sidney J. Furie		
1994	Bad Girls	Story	Yes	No	No	Jonathan Kaplan		
1994	The Scout	No	Yes	No	No	Michael Ritchie		
1996	Heaven's Prisoners	No	Yes	No	No	Phil Joanou		
2001	Mean Machine	Story	No	Yes	No	Barry Skolnick	Remake of The Longest Yard	
2004	Million Dollar Baby	No	Yes	No	No	Clint Eastwood		
2005	The Longest Yard	Story	No	Yes	No	Peter Segal	Remake of The Longest Yard	
2006	Cloud 9	Yes	Yes	No	No	Harry Basil		
2008	Camille	No	Yes	No	No	Gregory Mackenzie		
2011	Blur	No	No	No	Yes	John W. Kim	Special thanks	
2014	Sabotage	No	No	Yes	No	David Ayer		
2019	A Gunman's Curse	No	Yes	No	No	Ezequiel Martinez Jr.		
2021	Cry Macho	No	Yes	No	No	Clint Eastwood		

=== Television ===
Year	Title	Functioned as				Notes	Ref.
Year	Title	Creator	Writer	Producer	Exec. producer	Notes	Ref.
1963	The Lloyd Bridges Show		Yes	No	No	Wrote episode: "The Skippy Mannox Story"	
1965−71	Hogan's Heroes	Yes	Yes	No	No	Wrote episode "The Informer"	
1971	Thunderguys	No	No	Yes	No	Television film	
1976	How the West Was Won	Developer	No	Yes	No	29 episodes; produced the pilot	
1976	Revenge for a Rape	No	Story	No	No	Television film	
1981	Stockers	No	No	Yes	No	Television film	
1993−2001	Walker, Texas Ranger	Yes	No	Executive	Yes	executive produced 3 episodes	
1998	Martial Law	No	No	No	Yes	2 episodes	
2002	Flatland	No	No	No	Yes	1 episode	

TV films and miniseries

Year	Title	Creator	Writer	Executive producer	Other	Director	Notes	Ref.
1976	Revenge for a Rape	No	Yes	No	No	Timothy Galfas		
1991	Miracle in the Wilderness	No	No	Yes	No	Kevin James Dobson		
1997	Married to a Stranger	No	No	Yes	No	Sidney J. Furie		
2000	Running Mates	No	No	Yes	Yes	Ron Lagomarsino	Also actor; as "Fatcat"	
2002	Georgetown	No	No	Yes	No	Scott Winant		
2005	Walker, Texas Ranger: Trial by Fire	Yes	No	No	No	Aaron Norris		
2012	Hatfields & McCoys	No	No	No	Yes	Kevin Reynolds	Special thanks	
2022	The Offer	No	No	Yes	No	Dexter Fletcher; Adam Arkin; Gwyneth Horder-Payton		

== Awards and honors ==
Award	Year	Category	Work	Result
Academy Award	1973	Best Picture	The Godfather	Won
Academy Award	2005	Best Picture	Million Dollar Baby	Won
Billie Award	2005	Best Film	Million Dollar Baby	Nominated
Broadcast Film Critics Association Award	2005	Best Picture	Million Dollar Baby	Nominated
Bronze Wrangler	1976	Fictional Television Drama	How The West Was Won	Won
César Award	2005	Best Foreign Film	Million Dollar Baby	Won
David di Donatello	1973	Best Foreign Film	The Godfather	Won
David di Donatello	2005	Best Foreign Film	Million Dollar Baby	Won
ESPY Award	2005	Best Sports Movie	Million Dollar Baby	Nominated
Golden Globe Award	1973	Best Motion Picture – Drama	The Godfather	Won
Golden Globe Award	1975	Best Motion Picture – Musical or Comedy	The Longest Yard	Won
Golden Globe Award	2005	Best Motion Picture – Drama	Million Dollar Baby	Nominated
Golden Raspberry Award	1983	Worst Picture	Megaforce	Nominated
Golden Raspberry Award	1985	Worst Picture	Cannonball Run II	Nominated
Golden Raspberry Award	1985	Worst Screenplay	Cannonball Run II	Nominated
Phoenix Film Critics Society Award	2004	Best Film	Million Dollar Baby	Nominated
Producers Guild of America Award	2005	Best Theatrical Motion Picture	Million Dollar Baby	Nominated
National Board of Review Award	2005	Best Film	Million Dollar Baby	Nominated
