= Frank Illiano =

American mobster

- Born: 1928
- Died: January 6, 2014 (aged 85–86); New York, U.S.

Frank "Punchy" Illiano (1928 – January 6, 2014) was a Brooklyn Captain with the Genovese crime family. During the 1960s and 1970s, he served as a top lieutenant to the Gallo brothers in their two wars with the Colombo crime family leadership.

== Biography ==
Illiano began his criminal career as a member of the Gallo crew in the Profaci crime family, later known as the Colombo family. Illiano earned the nickname "Punchy" as a result of a short boxing career. His capo was "Crazy Joey" Gallo, who would become infamous for his feuds with the Profaci family bosses. In 1957, Illiano may have participated in the murder of Albert Anastasia, boss of the Mangano crime family.

Anastasia's underboss, Carlo Gambino, plotted with Joseph Profaci, boss of the Profaci family, to murder Anastasia while he was at a Manhattan barber shop. According to FBI and NYPD sources, Profaci delegated the job to Joey Gallo, who allegedly included Illiano in the assassination. Gallo allegedly referred to the hit squad, including Illiano, as his "barbershop quartet". Today, some sources believe that Joseph Biondo and other Gambino mobsters committed the murder.

According to Colombo government informant Joseph Luparelli, during the late-1950s, Joe Gallo and Illiano got into a fight with a much larger man at a Chinese restaurant in Little Italy. Luparelli had to help them subdue the guy. Gallo then used a kitchen cleaver to break open a storage room and shove the man inside.

=== First Colombo War ===
The First Colombo War started in February 1961, when the Gallos kidnapped several family leaders to force boss Joseph Profaci to distribute profits more fairly. Profaci agreed to a settlement to gain his loyalists' release, then later in 1962 tried to murder Larry Gallo at a meeting in a bar.

On January 29, 1962, Illiano and six other crew members rescued six small children from an apartment filled with smoke by a mattress fire. None of the children or mobsters were injured.

During the First Colombo War, Illiano allegedly wounded Profaci mobster Hugh McIntosh in a sniper attack. Illiano also allegedly planted a bomb underneath Carmine Persico's car. The bomb exploded but Persico escaped death. After Profaci's death in 1962, the conflict continued with Profaci's successor, Joseph Magliocco, until his 1963 death. On June 12, 1963, Illiano narrowly escaped assassination by a Profaci sniper.

In December 1963, Illiano was arrested on illegal gambling, assault and weapons charges. On January 8, 1965, Iliano and 14 other crew members pleaded guilty to misdemeanor assault in regard to the gang war and were sentenced to six months in prison.

=== Second Colombo War ===
The Second Colombo War began after the 1971 shooting of boss Joseph Colombo, as many mobsters considered Joey Gallo to be a prime suspect. This time the Gallo's target was boss Carmine Persico. In 1972, Persico gunmen assassinated Joey Gallo at a Manhattan restaurant. After Gallo's death, Illiano and Albert Gallo arranged the attempted murder of several Colombo family leaders at the Neapolitan Noodle restaurant in Manhattan.

However, when the hitman from Las Vegas went to the restaurant on August 11, 1972, he shot four innocent men by mistake, killing two of them. After the abortive Neapolitan hit, the other New York crime families decided to broker a peace agreement between the Colombo factions to end the bloodshed. As part of the agreement, Illiano and Albert Gallo joined the Genovese family with what remained of their crew.

=== Genovese family ===
During the mid-1970s, the Genovese crime family welcomed Illiano, Albert Gallo and other Gallo outcasts into its ranks. The Gallo crew had previously enjoyed a good relationship with Genovese leaders such as Anthony "Tony Bender" Strollo, Matthew "Matty the Horse" Ianniello and Vincent "The Chin" Gigante. Illiano and Albert "Kid Blast" Gallo became made men and Illiano a capo.

In the late 1990s, the imprisoned Gigante appointed Illiano as a street boss. As of 2010, Illiano was still operating a crew with Albert Gallo in Carroll Gardens, Brooklyn. The crew runs gambling and loan sharking operations in Brooklyn, Manhattan and Staten Island.

== Death ==
He died of an infection at a New York hospital in January 2014.
