= Pasquale Conte =

American mobster (born 1925)

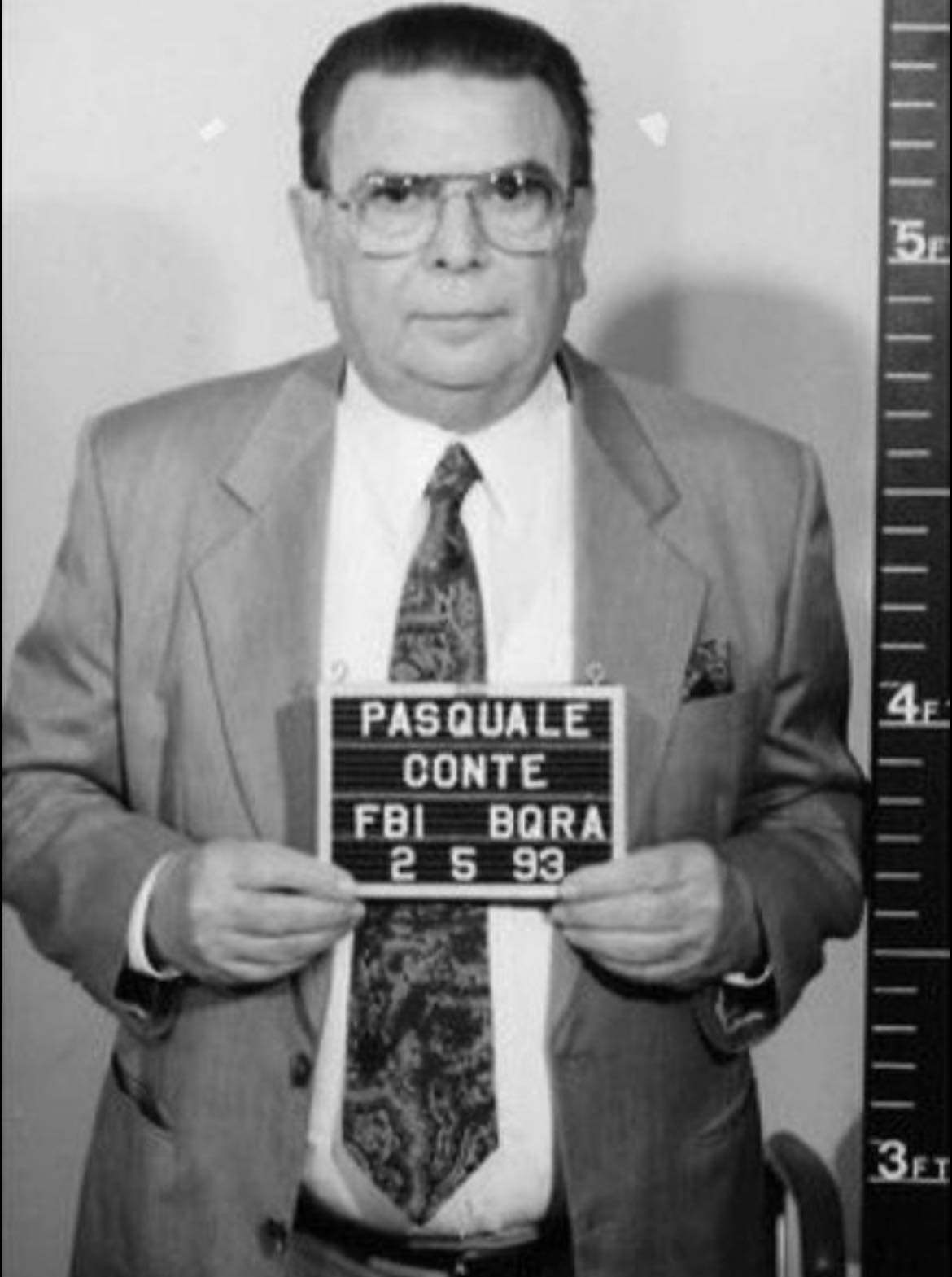
Conte's February 5, 1993 FBI mugshot

Pasquale "Patsy" Conte (March 12, 1925 – December 27, 2017) was an Italian-born American mobster who became a caporegime with the Gambino crime family of New York City. He also owned several Key Food supermarkets.

== Early life ==
Born in Sicily, Conte was a resident of Roslyn, New York. He was a businessman/capo in the Gambino crime family area in the City. Conte had 23.9 percent stake in Tapps Supermarkets, described as a "family-owned" business. Conte's son Pasquale Jr. is Tapps' vice president and treasurer.

== Alfano shooting ==
On February 18, 1987, Conte was indicted on charges of ordering the shooting of Sicilian mobster Pietro Alfano in the Greenwich Village section of Manhattan. Authorities arrested Conte at Kennedy International Airport as he was preparing to fly to Puerto Rico. Conte was holding $7,000 cash. On May 20, 1987, the government dropped the charges against him without any explanation.

== DiBono murder ==
In 1990, Gambino boss John Gotti ordered the murder of mobster Louis DiBono, DiBono had allegedly been disrespectful to Gotti, who decided to eliminate him, and sent Bobby Boriello to attend to DiBono. In October 1990, DiBono's bullet-ridden body was discovered in the front seat of a Cadillac sedan in the underground garage at the New York World Trade Center.

In February 1993, Conte was charged with the DiBono murder. However, in January 1994 a mistrial was declared due to a hung jury. In June 1994, Conte was reindicted on the DiBono murder. In lieu of a retrial, Conte decided to accept a plea bargain deal from the government.

On June 21, 1994, Conte and two others pleaded guilty to conspiracy to murder DiBono. In 1994, Conte was sentenced to seven and a half years in prison. In 2001, he was sentenced to another three and a half years in prison on a racketeering charge. Conte was released from federal prison on September 26, 2003.

== Death ==
Conte, died on December 27, 2017 at the age of 92.
