= Lawrence Dentico =

American mobster (born 1923)

- Born: Lawrence John Dentico; August 22, 1923
- Other names: Larry Fab; Little Larry; The Little Guy
- Organization: Genovese crime family

Lawrence Dentico (born August 22, 1923), also known as "Larry Fab", "Little Larry" and "The Little Guy", is a New Jersey-based member of the Genovese crime family, who formerly served as a captain and the family's consigliere.

Dentico was born in New York, New York, the son of Francesco Dentico and Madaline Palazzo. He is the nephew of Joseph Dentico born November 5, 1898, in Gioia del Colle in the south Italian region of Bari, Apulia and Theresa Romano, the wife of his uncle Joseph. In 1949 and in 1952, Dentico served brief prison sentences for selling heroin. During the 1950s, Dentico worked for boss Vito Genovese. In 1957, authorities suspected that Dentico provided the murder weapon and getaway car in the shooting death of mobster Johnny Earle. In 1966, Dentico was arrested for loansharking and extortion rackets in Hoboken, New Jersey.

When Vincent "the Chin" Gigante became family boss in 1981, Dentico was working as a top aide in New Jersey to Louis Manna, the former consigliere. In 1981, Dentico was convicted of fraud and conspiracy involving the bribing of officials in Union City, New Jersey, to rig bids on public construction contracts and served a six-year prison sentence. After Gigante went to prison for racketeering in 1997, Dentico and Genovese mobster Frank Illiano formed a two-man ruling panel of street bosses to operate the family. In August 2005, Dentico and other Genovese mobsters were indicted on charges of extortion conspiracy and conspiracy to commit murder. The defendants were accused of participating in loansharking, sports bookmaking, numbers running, and football-ticket gambling. Dentico pleaded guilty and on August 16, 2006, was sentenced to 51 months in prison. On May 12, 2009, Dentico was released from prison.

American Mafia
Preceded by James "Little Guy" Ida	Genovese crime family Consigliere; 2003-2005	Succeeded by Dominick "Quiet Dom" Cirillo
