= Venero Mangano =

American mobster

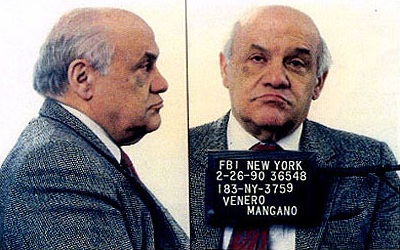
- Venero Mangano in 1990.
- Born: Venero Frank Mangano; September 7, 1921; Lower Manhattan, New York City, U.S.
- Died: August 18, 2017 (aged 95); Greenwich Village, New York City, U.S.
- Other names: "Benny", "Benny Eggs"
- Occupation: Mobster
- Spouse: Louise
- Children: 3
- Allegiance: Genovese crime family
- Convictions: Extortion and conspiracy (1991)
- Penalty: 15 years and eight months' imprisonment and fined $100,000 (1993)

Venero Frank "Benny Eggs" Mangano (September 7, 1921 – August 18, 2017) was the underboss of the Genovese crime family. In 1991, Mangano was convicted of one count of extortion and a related conspiracy count for rigging windows contracts, and in 1993, was sentenced to 15 years and eight months in prison and fined $100,000. He was released in 2006, and died of natural causes on August 18, 2017.

== Early career ==
Mangano was related to Gambino crime family boss Vincent Mangano (1888–1951), Philip Mangano, Lawrence Mangano and Anthony Mangano. The nickname "Benny Eggs" stemmed from an egg store his mother had run. Mangano was listed as a caporegime twice by the New Jersey Division of Gaming Enforcement in a 1987 exclusion order.

During World War II, Mangano served in the 334th Bomb Squadron, 95th Bomb Group(H), as a bomber tail gunner with the 8th Air Force of United States Army Air Corps in Europe. In recognition of his service, the Army decorated Mangano with a Distinguished Flying Cross and an Air Medal with four Oak Leaf Clusters and three Battle Stars.

Mangano later joined a crew in Greenwich Village that would later belong to Vincent "The Chin" Gigante. Mangano oversaw his businesses out of a social club at 110 Thompson Street. These operations included a monopoly on window replacement in the New York City metropolitan area.

== Windows case ==
From 1978 to 1990, four of the five crime families of New York rigged bids for 75 percent of $191 million, or about $142 million, of the window contracts awarded by the New York City Housing Authority. Installation companies were required to make union payoffs between $1 and $2 for each windows installed.

On May 30, 1990, Mangano was indicted in the "Windows case" along with other members of four of the New York crime families. On October 19, 1991, Mangano was convicted of one count of extortion and a related conspiracy count in the Windows case. On March 26, 1993, Mangano was sentenced to 15 years and eight months in prison and fined $100,000.

In 1997, while still in prison, Mangano was called to testify against boss Gigante. He refused to testify, saying, "What do you want to do, shoot me?" then "Shoot me, but I'm not going to answer any questions". He later took the witness stand, but refused to answer any questions, invoking his Fifth Amendment rights.

On May 3, 2006, Mangano was transferred to a halfway house in Bedford–Stuyvesant, Brooklyn. On November 2, 2006, he was released after 13 years in prison. He had heart disease and macular degeneration that left him virtually blind. Mangano died of natural causes in Greenwich Village on August 18, 2017.

== In popular culture ==
A fictionalized version of Mangano is portrayed by Kevin Corrigan in the first and second seasons of the 2019 TV series Godfather of Harlem. This version is depicted as being killed in 1964 by Stella Gigante (Lucy Fry) and Ernie Nunzi (Rafi Gavron) as revenge for the death of the former's boyfriend at the hands of Mangano.

American Mafia
Preceded by Saverio "Sammy" Santora	Genovese crime family Underboss; 1987–2017	Unknown
