= Nicholas Gage =

American author and journalist (born 1939)

Nicholas Gage (born Nikolaos Gatzoyiannis; Greek: Νικόλαος Γκατζογιάννης; July 23, 1939) is a Greek-born American author and investigative journalist.

== Early life ==
Nicholas Gage (original name, Nikos Gatzoyiannis) was born in 1939 in Lia, a village in Thesprotia, northwestern Greece. Gage spent his early years with his mother, Eleni, and four older sisters. His father, Christos, had left to find work in the United States. After World War II, Eleni and her children found themselves caught in the Greek Civil War between the communists and the Royalists. In 1947, Communist fighters gained control of Lia. When the communists began to retreat in the spring of 1948, they took some children with them. Fearing that her children would be sent to communist countries, Eleni made arrangements for her family to flee. Gage and three of his sisters escaped, but his mother and one of his sisters were left behind. The Communists arrested Eleni, who was put on trial and executed. Eventually, Gage and his sisters joined their father in the United States.

== Career ==
He is most known for two books of autobiographical memoirs, the best-selling Eleni (1983) and A Place for Us (1989). Eleni describes the life of his family in Greece during the Second World War and Greek Civil War. Gage's mother, Eleni, was executed for arranging the escape of her children from their Communist-occupied village. Decades later, as an adult, Gage sought out those responsible for her death.

A Place for Us relates the Gage family's experiences as immigrants in 1950s America in the city of Worcester, Massachusetts. In 1964, Gage earned a master's degree from the Columbia University Graduate School of Journalism.

In 1985, Eleni was made into a feature film starring John Malkovich as Gage. In 1987, Eleni was cited by Ronald Reagan as an inspiration for his summit meetings to end the arms race with the Soviet Union.

Gage first achieved fame as an investigative reporter for The Wall Street Journal and The New York Times. His acclaimed coverage of the Mafia led to two best-selling books: The Mafia Is Not An Equal Opportunity Employer and Mafia, U.S.A.

He was also instrumental in exposing corruption in the past of Vice President Spiro Agnew, which led to Agnew's resignation. During the Watergate scandal, Gage was the first reporter to hear any of the Nixon tapes. His experiences as a reporter were the basis for the 1977 CBS television show The Andros Targets. In 1985, the company had inked an overall production deal with Paramount Pictures, whereas Gage would develop offices for Paramount's New York headquarters.

Gage was an Executive Producer of The Godfather Part III, co-writing an early draft of the script with Mario Puzo. The movie was nominated for seven Golden Globe Awards and seven Academy Awards.

His book Eleni, which has been translated into 32 languages, was awarded first prize by the Royal Society of Literature of Great Britain and was nominated in the category of best biography by the National Book Critics Circle.

His most recent book is Greek Fire: The Story of Maria Callas and Aristotle Onassis, an account of the relationship between Aristotle Onassis and opera singer Maria Callas, which was published by Alfred A. Knopf in 2000.

Gage is the honorary president of the World of Epirotes and a recipient of The International Center in New York's Award of Excellence. He continues to speak throughout the world and writes for such publications as The New York Times and Vanity Fair.

== Litigation ==
On January 5, 2024, Gage and Nicholas A. Basbanes, nonfiction book author and journalist, sued Microsoft and OpenAI in a proposed class action complaint filed in the U. S. District Court for the Southern District of New York. The lawsuit alleges that the defendants “stole” writers’ copyrighted works to help build AI chatbot ChatGPT, an artificial intelligence system they say is worth billions of dollars. The class is defined as all nonfiction writers in the United States, many of them trained as journalists, “who are authors or legal beneficial owners” of copyrights that have or are being used by the defendants to “train their large language models” and it estimates the class to include tens of thousands of people. It seeks damages of up to $150,000 for each work infringed. This lawsuit follows several other suits and letters of complaint filed alleging copyright infringement not only by these defendants, but also by Meta Platforms, Alphabet and IBM. These suits by authors and performers, and actions by The Authors Guild, The Writers Guild of America and the Screen Actors Guild are seeking protection for creators over AI use.

Open AI has issued a statement saying, “We respect the rights of content creators and owners and are committed to working with them to ensure they benefit from AI technology and new revenue models."

== Personal life ==
Gage and his wife, Joan, live in North Grafton, Massachusetts. He is the father of three children: Christos, Eleni, and Marina.

== List of published works ==
=== Books ===
- The Mafia is Not an Equal Opportunity Employer. McGraw-Hill. 1971. ISBN 978-9120029894.
- (as editor) Mafia, U.S.A. Playboy Press Book. 1972.
- Eleni – ISBN 978-0-345-41043-6;
- A Place for Us – ISBN 978-1-886284-73-9;
- The Bourlotas fortune – ISBN 978-0-552-10473-9;
- Hellas: A Portrait of Greece – ISBN 978-0-00-272278-0;
- Greece: Land of Light – ISBN 978-0-8212-2524-0;
- Greek Fire: The Story of Maria Callas and Aristotle Onassis – ISBN 978-0-446-61076-6.
- The Teacher Who Changed My Life

=== Magazine articles ===
- "The Last Onassis", Vanity Fair, May 2005 (about Athina Onassis de Miranda, granddaughter of Aristotle Onassis)
