= Larry Gallo =

American mobster (1927-1968)

- Born: November 3, 1927; New York City, New York, U.S.
- Died: May 17, 1968 (aged 40); East Meadow, New York, U.S.
- Occupation: Mobster
- Relatives: Albert Gallo (brother); Joe Gallo (brother)
- Allegiance: Colombo crime family

Lawrence "Larry" Gallo (November 3, 1927 – May 17, 1968) was an American mobster who became a member of the Profaci crime family of Cosa Nostra in New York City. His younger brothers Joey and Albert would follow him into organized crime. He was the leader of the Gallo Crew from President Street in Red Hook, Brooklyn. Hostilities broke out between the Gallo Crew and the rest of the Profaci Family. These hostilities became known as the Gallo-Profaci War. In an effort to peacefully resolve the war, a sit-down was scheduled at the Sahara Lounge in Flatbush, Brooklyn on August 20, 1961. Gallo's friend and bodyguard Joe "Jelly" Gioielli was not at this important meeting. An attempt was made on Gallo's life at the meeting, but a police officer walked in. The assassins fled, shooting Officer Melvin Blei in the face. Both Blei and Gallo survived. In accord with mob tradition, Gallo would not name the attempted assassins. Larry and the Gallo crew once rescued a mother and five children from a burning tenement, and in 1966 they helped the City Youth Board by intervening with Italian youth gangs.

Gallo struggled with cancer for many years. He died at Nassau Hospital on May 17, 1968.
