= Italian-American Civil Rights League =

American mafia organization

The Italian-American Civil Rights League (IACRL) was an American political advocacy group formed in New York City in April 1970. William Santoro, a defense attorney who represented numerous Colombo crime family figures, handled the legal work to incorporate the league. Although its stated goal was to combat pejorative stereotypes regarding Italian-Americans and their alleged mob connections, the group functioned as a public relations firm to deny the existence of the Italian-American Mafia and polish the image of prominent mobsters. Following its closure, a separate organization adopted the name and remains active today.

== History ==
In April 1970, Joseph Colombo created the Italian-American Civil Rights League, the month his son Joseph Colombo Jr. was charged with melting down coins for resale as silver ingots. In response, Joseph Colombo Sr. claimed FBI harassment of Italian Americans and, on April 30, 1970, sent 30 picketers outside FBI headquarters at Third Avenue and 69th Street to protest the federal persecution of all Italians everywhere; this went on for weeks. On June 29, 1970, 50,000 people attended the first Italian Unity Day rally in Columbus Circle in New York City. Footage of the 1970 rally appeared in the film Days of Fury (1979), directed by Fred Warshofsky and hosted by Vincent Price. In February 1971, Colombo Jr. was acquitted of the charge after the chief witness in the trial had been arrested on perjury charges.

The group then turned its attention to what it perceived as cultural slights and discrimination against Italian-Americans, using boycott threats to force Alka-Seltzer and the Ford Motor Company to withdraw television commercials the league objected to. Another group success was that U.S. Attorney General John Mitchell ordered the U.S. Justice Department to stop using the word "Mafia" in official documents and press releases. The league also secured an agreement from Albert S. Ruddy, the producer of The Godfather, to omit the terms "Mafia" and "cosa nostra" from the film's dialogue, and succeeded in having Macy's stop selling a board game called The Godfather Game. The League strong-armed merchants and residents in Little Italy to purchase and display league decals opposing the film. The League threatened to shut down the Teamsters, which included the truckers, drivers, and crew members who were essential to making the film. The IACRL boycotted the Ford Motor Company because of its sponsorship of the television show The F.B.I. and its negative references to Italian-Americans as gangsters.

According to an FBI memo dated June 9, 1971, the IACRL created an alliance in April 1971 with the far-right terrorist group the Jewish Defense League. Both organizations felt they faced similar problems of harassment from the government. Meir Kahane also claimed he was trying to establish dialogue with Italians because he believed antisemitism and racism were common in the Italian-American community. The alliance was made public on May 12 when Joseph Colombo Sr. attended a press conference with Kahane. Colombo Sr. also paid the 45,000 dollars Kahane needed for bail after being arrested on charges of conspiracy to violate the 1968 Federal Gun Control Act. Kahane stated that Joseph Colombo Jr. was sympathetic to the plight of Jews in the Soviet Union, and thought he could use the Italian community to help raise awareness about Soviet Jews. Kahane defended their relationship by saying, "I’d take help from anybody. If the State of Israel took help from Joseph Stalin, then I could take help from Joe Colombo.". The two organizations would engage in picketing of the New York Office [of the FBI], a golf tournament at Lake Isle County Club, and protests against other local agencies.

On June 28, 1971, at the second Italian Unity Day rally in Columbus Circle in Manhattan, Colombo was shot three times, once in the head, by Jerome A. Johnson; Johnson was immediately killed by Colombo's bodyguards. Colombo survived the shooting, but was paralyzed. Colombo died seven years later from cardiac arrest due to injuries sustained from the shooting.

== Aftermath ==
Following the shooting in 1971, Colombo never recovered and The League largely ceased operations. Following its closure, another Italian American association was founded which borrowed the name of the IACRL, but was otherwise apparently unrelated to the former IACRL until 2025 when its board was joined by Joseph Colombo's grandson Anthony E. Colombo Jr. In July that year, the organization participated in protests against Zohran Mamdani's candidacy in the mayoral election.

The group is now led nationally by Colombo Jr. who serves as Chairman, businessman and political figure Mike Crispi who serves as President, and criminal defense attorney Gerard Marrone who serves as Vice President.

== See also ==
- Anti-Italian racism
