= Joseph Colombo =

American mob boss (1923–1978)

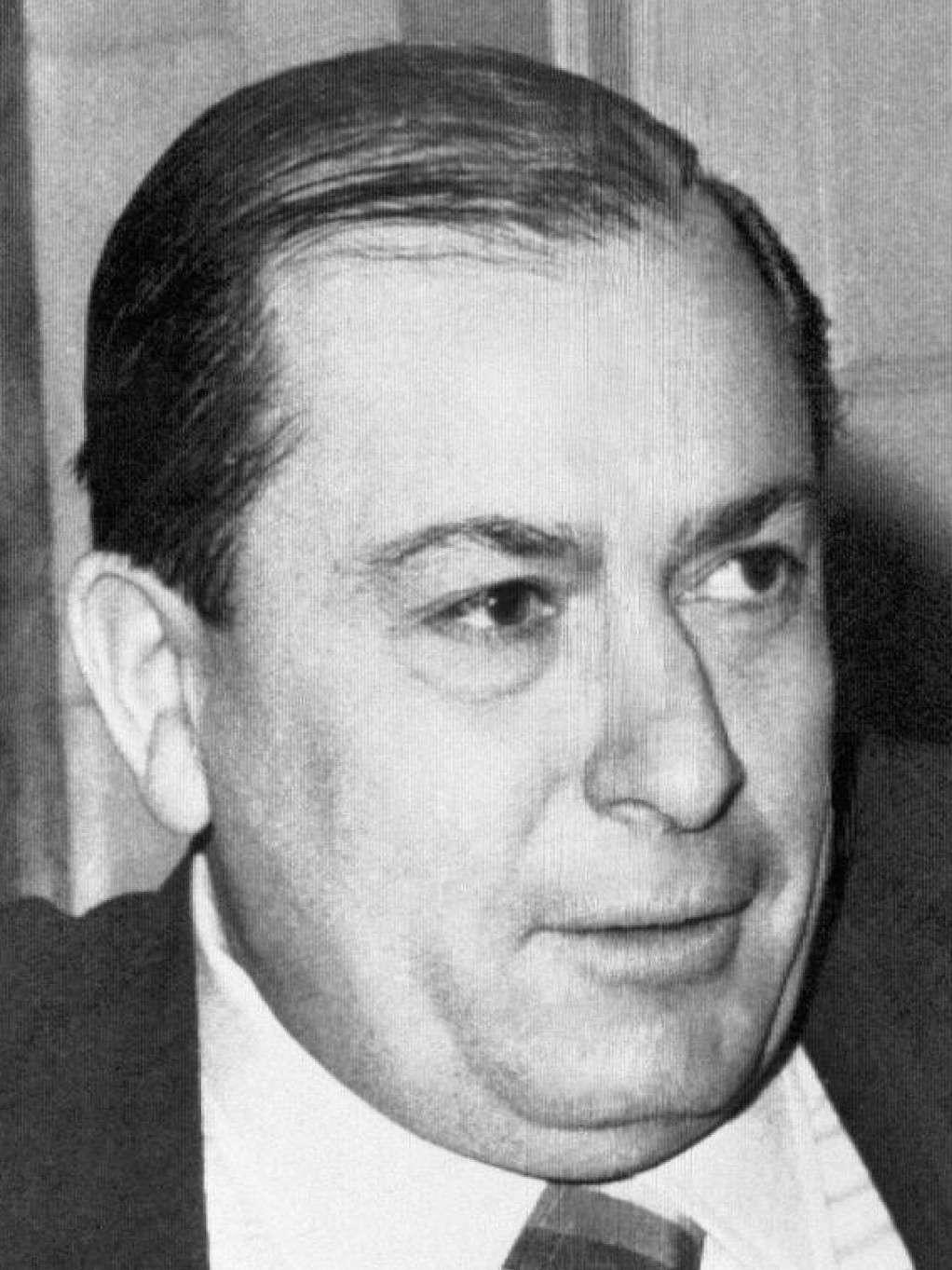
- Colombo in 1971
- Born: Joseph Anthony Colombo; June 16, 1923; New York City, U.S.
- Died: May 22, 1978 (aged 54); Newburgh, New York, U.S.
- Resting place: St. John's Cemetery, Queens
- Occupation: Crime boss
- Predecessor: Joseph Magliocco
- Successor: Carmine Persico
- Spouse: Lucille Faiello (m. 1944)
- Children: 5
- Allegiance: Colombo crime family Italian-American Civil Rights League
- Conviction: Contempt of court (1966)
- Penalty: 30 days in prison

Joseph Anthony Colombo Sr. (Italian: [koˈlombo]; June 16, 1923 – May 22, 1978) was an American mobster who rose to the position of boss of the Colombo crime family and founded the Italian-American Civil Rights League.

Colombo was born in New York City, where his father was an early member of what was then the Profaci crime family. In 1961, the First Colombo War unfolded, instigated by the kidnapping of four high-ranking members in the Profaci family by Joe Gallo. Later that year, Gallo was imprisoned, and in 1962, family leader Joe Profaci died of cancer. In 1963, Bonanno crime family boss, Joseph Bonanno made plans with Joseph Magliocco to assassinate several rivals on The Commission. Magliocco gave the contract to one of his top hit men, Colombo, who revealed the plot to its targets. The Commission spared Magliocco's life but forced him into retirement, while Bonanno fled to Canada. As a reward for turning on his boss, Colombo was awarded the Profaci family. His only prison term would come in 1966, when Colombo was sentenced to 30 days in prison for contempt of court by refusing to answer questions from a grand jury about his financial affairs.

In 1970, Colombo created the Italian-American Civil Rights League. Later that year, the first Italian Unity Day rally was held in Columbus Circle to protest the federal persecution of Italians. In 1971, Gallo was released from prison, and Colombo invited him to a peace meeting with an offering of $1,000, which Gallo refused, instigating the Second Colombo War. On June 28, 1971, Colombo was shot three times by Jerome Johnson at the second Italian Unity Day rally in Columbus Circle sponsored by the Italian-American Civil Rights League; Johnson was immediately killed by Colombo's bodyguards. Colombo was paralyzed from the shooting. On May 22, 1978, Colombo died of cardiac arrest that resulted from his injuries.

== Early life ==
Joseph Colombo Sr. was born into an Italian American family on June 16, 1923, in Brooklyn. His mother was from Naples, Italy, and his father, Anthony "Nino" Colombo, born in Brazil with parents from Potenza, Italy, was an early member of the Profaci crime family, which would eventually be renamed after his son. In 1938, he was found strangled in a car with woman friend, Christine Oliveri. Joe Colombo attended New Utrecht High School in Brooklyn for two years, then dropped out to join the U.S. Coast Guard. In 1945, he was diagnosed with neurosis and discharged from the service. His legitimate jobs included ten years as a longshoreman and six years as a salesman for a meat company. His final job was that of a real estate salesman.

Colombo owned a modest home in Bay Ridge, Brooklyn and a five-acre estate in Blooming Grove, New York. He married Lucille Faiello in 1944, and had five children including sons Christopher Colombo, Joseph Colombo Jr. (1946–2014) and Anthony Colombo (1945–2017).

== First Colombo War ==
Colombo followed his father into the Profaci family. He became one of the family's top enforcers, and soon became a capo.

On February 27, 1961, the Gallos kidnapped four of Joe Profaci's top men: underboss Magliocco, Frank Profaci (Joe Profaci's brother), capo Salvatore Musacchia, and soldier John Scimone. Profaci himself eluded capture and flew to sanctuary in Florida. While holding the hostages, Larry and Albert Gallo sent Joe Gallo to California. The Gallos demanded a more favorable financial scheme in return for the hostages' release. Gallo wanted to kill one hostage and demand $100,000 before negotiations, but his brother Larry overruled him. After a few weeks of negotiation, Profaci made a deal with the Gallos. Profaci's consigliere Charles "The Sidge" LoCicero negotiated with the Gallos and all the hostages were released peacefully. However, Profaci had no intention of honoring this peace agreement. On August 20, 1961, Profaci ordered the murder of Gallo family members Joseph "Joe Jelly" Gioielli and Larry Gallo. Gunmen allegedly murdered Gioilli after inviting him to go fishing. Larry Gallo survived a strangulation attempt in the Sahara club of East Flatbush by Carmine Persico and Salvatore "Sally" D'Ambrosio after a police officer intervened. The Gallo brothers had been previously aligned with Persico against Profaci and his loyalists; The Gallos then began calling Persico "The Snake" after he had betrayed them. The war continued and resulted in nine murders and three disappearances. With the start of the gang war, the Gallo crew retreated to the Dormitory.

In late November 1961, Joe Gallo was sentenced to seven-to-fourteen years in prison for murder. On June 6, 1962, Profaci died and was succeeded by longtime underboss Joseph Magliocco. In 1963, Joseph Bonanno, the head of the Bonanno crime family, made plans to assassinate several rivals on the Mafia Commission—bosses Tommy Lucchese, Carlo Gambino, and Stefano Magaddino, as well as Frank DeSimone. Bonanno sought Magliocco's support, and Magliocco readily agreed. Bonanno was not only bitter from being denied a seat on the Commission, but he and Profaci had been close allies for over 30 years prior to Profaci's death. Bonanno's audacious goal was to take over the Commission and make Magliocco his right-hand man. Magliocco was assigned the task of killing Lucchese and Gambino, and gave the contract to one of his top hit men, Colombo but he revealed the plot to its targets. The other bosses quickly realized that Magliocco could not have planned this himself. Remembering how close Bonanno was with Magliocco (and before him, Profaci), as well as their close ties through marriages, the other bosses concluded Bonanno was the mastermind. The Commission summoned Bonanno and Magliocco to explain themselves. Fearing for his life, Bonanno went into hiding in Montreal, leaving Magliocco to deal with the Commission. Badly shaken and in failing health, Magliocco confessed his role in the plot. The Commission spared Magliocco's life, but forced him to retire as Profaci family boss and pay a $50,000 fine. As a reward for turning on his boss, Colombo was awarded the Profaci family.

At the age of 41, Colombo was one of the youngest crime bosses in the country. He was also the first American-born boss of a New York crime family. When NYPD detective Albert Seedman (later the NYPD chief of detectives) called Colombo in for questioning about the death of one of his soldiers, Colombo came to the meeting without a lawyer. He told Seedman, "I am an American citizen, first class. I don't have a badge that makes me an official good guy like you, but I work just as honest for a living." On May 9, 1966, Colombo was sentenced to 30 days in jail for contempt by refusing to answer questions from a grand jury about his financial affairs.

In September 1966 he was arrested along with twelve others after attending the La Stella Restaurant meeting. All thirteen men were arrested and charged with "consorting with known criminals", each had bail set at $100,000. The sum total of their bail, $1,300,000, was paid the next day by a bail bondsman with no collateral. They were subsequently released.

== Italian-American Civil Rights League ==
In April 1970, Colombo created the Italian-American Civil Rights League. That same month, his son Joseph Colombo Jr. was charged with melting down coins for resale as silver ingots. In response, Joseph Colombo Sr. claimed FBI harassment of Italian-Americans and, on April 30, 1970, sent 30 picketers outside FBI headquarters at Third Avenue and 69th Street to protest the federal persecution of all Italians everywhere; this went on for weeks. On June 29, 1970, 50,000 people attended the first Italian Unity Day rally in Columbus Circle in New York City. In February 1971, Colombo Jr. was acquitted of the federal charge after the chief witness in the trial was arrested on perjury charges.

Under Colombo's guidance, the League grew quickly and achieved national attention. Unlike other mob leaders who shunned the spotlight, Colombo appeared on television interviews, fundraisers and speaking engagements for the League. In 1971, Colombo aligned the League with Rabbi and political activist Meir Kahane's Jewish Defense League, claiming that both groups were being harassed by the federal government. At one point, Colombo posted bail for 11 jailed JDL members.

=== The Godfather ===
In the spring of 1971, Paramount Pictures started filming The Godfather with the assistance of Colombo and the League. Due to its subject matter, the film originally faced great opposition from Italian-Americans to filming in New York. After producer Albert Ruddy met with Colombo and agreed to excise the terms "Mafia" and "Cosa Nostra" from the film, the League cooperated. The first meeting involved Ruddy, Colombo, Colombo's son Anthony and 1,500 delegates from Colombo's Italian-American Civil Rights League. Ruddy would afterwards hold numerous meetings with Anthony, which led to assurance that the film would be based on individuals and would not defame or stereotype a group.

== Shooting ==
In early 1971, Joe Gallo was released from prison. As a supposedly conciliatory gesture, Colombo invited Gallo to a peace meeting with an offering of $1,000. Gallo refused the invitation, wanting $100,000 to stop the conflict, which Colombo refused to pay. At that point, acting boss Vincenzo Aloi issued a new order to kill Gallo. On March 11, 1971, after being convicted of perjury for lying on his application to become a real estate broker, Colombo was sentenced to two and half years in state prison. The sentence, however, was delayed pending an appeal. On June 28, 1971, Colombo was shot three times in the head and neck by Jerome A. Johnson, a 24-year old African American man at the second Italian Unity Day rally in Columbus Circle sponsored by the Italian-American Civil Rights League; while being detained by police, Johnson was killed by one of Colombo's bodyguards.

Although many in the Colombo family blamed Joe Gallo for the shooting, the police stated that they had no evidence Gallo was involved after they had questioned Gallo. Since Johnson had spent time a few days earlier at a Gambino club, one theory was that Carlo Gambino organized the shooting. Colombo refused to listen to Gambino's complaints about the League, and allegedly spat in Gambino's face during one argument. However, the Colombo family leadership was convinced that Joe Gallo ordered the murder after his falling out with the family. Gallo was murdered on April 7, 1972.

=== Aftermath ===
Colombo was paralyzed from the shooting. On August 28, 1971, after two months at Roosevelt Hospital in Manhattan, Colombo was moved to his estate at Blooming Grove. In 1975, a court-ordered examination showed that Colombo could move his thumb and forefinger on his right hand. In 1976, there were reports that he could recognize people and utter several words.

After the Colombo shooting, Joseph Yacovelli became the acting boss for one year before Carmine Persico took over.

His shooting is depicted in Martin Scorsese's film The Irishman (2019), where he is portrayed by John Polce and in the Paramount mini-series The Offer (2022) by Giovanni Ribisi.

== Death ==
On May 22, 1978, Colombo died of cardiac arrest at St. Luke's Hospital (later St. Luke's Cornwall Hospital) in Newburgh, New York. Colombo's funeral was held at St. Bernadette's Catholic Church in Bensonhurst and he was buried in St. John Cemetery in the Middle Village section of Queens.

American Mafia
Preceded by Joseph Magliocco	Colombo crime family Boss; 1964-1971	Succeeded by Vincent Aloi
