= Joseph Magliocco =

Sicilian-American mob boss (1898–1963)

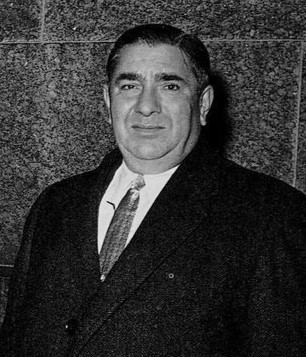
- Magliocco in the 1950s
- Born: Giuseppe Magliocco; June 29, 1898; Misilmeri, Sicily, Italy
- Died: December 28, 1963 (aged 65); West Islip, New York, U.S.
- Resting place: Saint Charles Cemetery, Farmingdale, New York, U.S.
- Other names: "Joe Malayak" "Joe Evil Eye"
- Occupation: Crime boss
- Predecessor: Joseph Profaci
- Successor: Joseph Colombo
- Relatives: Joseph Profaci (brother-in-law)
- Allegiance: Profaci crime family

Joseph Magliocco (born Giuseppe Magliocco; Italian pronunciation: [dʒuˈzɛppe maʎˈʎɔkko]; June 29, 1898 – December 28, 1963), also known as "Joe Malayak" and "Joe Evil Eye", was a Sicilian-born American mobster and the boss of the Profaci crime family (later to become the Colombo crime family) in New York City between 1962 and 1963. In 1963, Magliocco participated in an audacious attempt with fellow mobster Joseph Bonanno to kill other family bosses and take over the Commission, the American Mafia's governing body. The attempt failed and he was forced into retirement. Soon after, on December 28, 1963, Magliocco died of a heart attack.

== Background ==
Joseph Magliocco was born in Portella di Mare, a frazione in the comune of Misilmeri, in the province of Palermo, in Sicily. Magliocco's nickname, "Joe Malayak," came from the word Maluk, which meant "ruler". Despite weighing over 300 pounds, Magliocco was described as being very energetic and decisive in his work and physical gestures, someone who exuded danger and confidence. According to Joseph Bonanno, Magliocco was an excellent Italian chef and loved to eat.

== Early years ==
As a young man, Magliocco became involved in illegal gambling and union racketeering. On December 5, 1928, Magliocco and Profaci attended a meeting of New York mobsters at the Statler Hotel in Cleveland, Ohio. The main topic was dividing the Brooklyn territory of the recently murdered boss Salvatore D'Aquila without causing a gang war. By the end of the meeting, Profaci had received a share of the open territory and named Magliocco as his second-in-command—a post he would hold for the next 34 years. When the Cleveland Police raided the meeting, Magliocco was briefly detained on an illegal weapons charge.

In 1931, the Castellammarese War began in New York between two powerful Italian-American gangs. Both Profaci and Magliocco attempted to stay neutral during this conflict. By the end of 1931, the war was over and the New York gangs were divided into five crime families supervised by a Mafia Commission. Profaci and Magliocco were confirmed as boss and underboss, respectively, of what was now known as the Profaci crime family.

== Family business ==
Profaci was closely aligned with the Bonanno crime family. His crime family was likewise based in Brooklyn and derived most of its income from labor rackets, gambling, hijacking, loan sharking, extortion, and heroin. In 1946 he attended the Havana Conference in Cuba.

Magliocco was the silent partner in a liquor company, Alpine Wine and Liquor, and a linen company, Arrow Linen Supply. In 1963, it was reported that Magliocco was using his clout to force bars and restaurants to buy from both companies.

== Appalachin ==
In 1957, Magliocco was arrested with 60 other mobsters who were attending the Apalachin Conference, a national mob meeting in Apalachin, New York. On January 13, 1960, Magliocco and 21 others were convicted of conspiracy to commit perjury when questioned about the Apalachin meeting; he was sentenced to five years in prison. However, on November 28, 1960, a United States Court of Appeals overturned the verdicts on the ground that there was insufficient evidence that the defendants had agreed among themselves to lie to the grand jury.

== The Profaci-Gallo War ==
In 1959 Profaci ordered the murder of a Frank Abbatemarco, a captain in the Profaci crime family who ran lucrative bookmaking, loan sharking, and numbers operations who had stopped paying tributes. Accounts differ as to whether the Gallo brothers were responsible for Abbatemarco's killing or the indirect target of it, because the Gallos had encouraged Abbatemarco to withhold his tribute.

In either event, Abbatemarco's killing sparked a family war that pitted Profaci and his associates against the Gallo brothers and several other defectors. On February 27, 1961 the Gallos, led by Joe Gallo, kidnapped four of Profaci's top men: underboss Magliocco, Frank Profaci (Joe Profaci's brother), capo Salvatore Musacchia and soldier John Scimone. Profaci eluded capture and flew to sanctuary in Florida. While holding the hostages, Larry and Albert Gallo sent Joe Gallo to California. The Gallos demanded a more favorable financial scheme for the hostages' release. Gallo wanted to kill one hostage and demand $100,000 before negotiations, but his brother Larry overruled him. After a few weeks of negotiation, Profaci made a deal with the Gallos.

Profaci's consigliere Charles "the Sidge" LoCicero negotiated with the Gallos and all the hostages were released peacefully. However, Profaci had no intention of honoring this peace agreement. On August 20, 1961 Joseph Profaci ordered the murder of Gallo members Joseph "Joe Jelly" Gioielli and Larry Gallo. Gunmen allegedly murdered Gioilli after inviting him to go fishing. Larry Gallo survived a strangulation attempt in the Sahara club of East Flatbush by Carmine Persico and Salvatore "Sally" D'Ambrosio after a police officer intervened. The Gallo brothers had been previously aligned with Persico against Profaci and his loyalists; The Gallos then began calling Persico "The Snake" after he had betrayed them. The war continued on, resulting in nine murders and three disappearances. With the start of the gang war, the Gallo crew retreated to the Dormitory at 51st President Street in Red Hook.

== Family boss ==
On June 6, 1962, Profaci died of liver cancer and Magliocco became the family boss. However, the Mafia Commission did not endorse him as the new family leader.

Afraid that the other New York families viewed him as weak, Magliocco increased the tempo of violence against the Gallo faction. In turn, car bombs, drive-by shootings, and other murder attempts were made against Magliocco men such as Carmine Persico and his enforcer, Hugh McIntosh. In 1963, with the jailing of Gallo and several associates, the hostilities temporarily ended.

== Commission plot ==
In 1963, Joseph Bonanno, the head of the Bonanno crime family, made plans to assassinate several rivals on the Mafia Commission—bosses Tommy Lucchese, Carlo Gambino, and Stefano Magaddino, as well as Frank DeSimone. Bonanno sought Magliocco's support, and Magliocco readily agreed. Not only was he bitter from being denied a seat on the Commission, but Bonanno and Profaci had been close allies for over 30 years. Bonanno's audacious goal was to take over the Commission and make Magliocco his right hand man.

Magliocco was assigned the task of killing Lucchese and Gambino, and gave the contract to one of his top hit men, Joseph Colombo. However, the opportunistic Colombo revealed the plot to its targets. The other bosses quickly realized that Magliocco could not have planned this himself. Knowing how close Bonanno was with Magliocco (and before him, Profaci), as well as their close ties through marriages, the other bosses concluded Bonanno was the real mastermind.

The Commission summoned Bonanno and Magliocco to explain themselves. Fearing for his life, Bonanno went into hiding in Montreal, leaving Magliocco to deal with the Commission. Badly shaken and in failing health, Magliocco confessed his role in the plot. The Commission spared Magliocco's life, but forced him to retire as Profaci family boss and pay a $50,000 fine. As a reward for turning on his boss, Colombo was awarded the Profaci family, which became known as the Colombo crime family.

== Personal life ==
Magliocco lived on a six-acre waterfront estate in East Islip, New York. Magliocco's son, Ambrose Magliocco, was a capo in the Profaci crime family. Magliocco's second cousin and brother-in-law was Joseph Profaci himself, founder of the Profaci crime family. Magliocco was an in-law of consigliere and underboss Salvatore Mussachio, related by marriage to Buffalo crime family boss Stefano Magaddino, and uncle to the wife of Bonanno crime family founder Joseph Bonanno.

== Death ==
On December 28, 1963, Joseph Magliocco died of a heart attack at Good Samaritan Hospital Medical Center in West Islip, New York. Magliocco is buried in Saint Charles Cemetery in Farmingdale, New York.

In 1969, the authorities exhumed Magliocco's body to determine whether he had been poisoned. This action was taken based on FBI phone tapings in which DeCavalcante crime family boss Sam DeCavalcante suggested that Joseph Bonanno poisoned Magliocco. However, no traces of poison were found in the body and it was re-interred at Saint Charles.

== In popular culture ==
Magliocco was portrayed by Michael Rispoli in the second season of the 2019 TV series Godfather of Harlem. The show, which blends facts with fiction, depicts him getting killed by Vincent Gigante.

American Mafia
Preceded by Joseph Profaci	Colombo crime family Boss; 1962-1963	Succeeded by Joseph Colombo
