= 1999 in organized crime =

List of years in organized crime
- … 1989; 1990; 1991; 1992; 1993; 1994; 1995; 1996; 1997; 1998; 1999; 2000; 2001; 2002; 2003; 2004; 2005; 2006; 2007; 2008; 2009 …
- Art; Archaeology; Architecture; Literature; Music; Philosophy; Science; +...

== Events ==
- July 27 – Police in Durrës, Albania, with assistance from Italian authorities, arrest one of the godfathers of the Italian crime group Sacra Corona Unita.
- FBI surveillance captures footage of Las Vegas strip club owner Rick Rizzolo, in Chicago, discussing gambling and construction "interests" with Joseph "Joe the Builder" Andriacchi, John "No Nose" DiFronzo, Rudy Fratto, Joseph "Joey the Clown" Lombardo and William Messino.

== Arts and literature ==
- Analyze This (film) starring Robert De Niro, Billy Crystal, Lisa Kudrow and Chazz Palminteri.
- Bonanno: A Godfather's Story (film) starring Martin Landau, Bruce Ramsay, Tony Nardi and Costas Mandylor.
- Excellent Cadavers (film) starring Chazz Palminteri and F. Murray Abraham.
- Lansky (film) starring Richard Dreyfuss, Eric Roberts, Anthony LaPaglia, Max Perlich, Beverly D'Angelo, Matthew Settle and Stanley DeSantis.
- Mickey Blue Eyes (film) starring Hugh Grant, James Caan, Burt Young, Joe Viterelli, Vincent Pastore, Frank Pellegrino, John Ventimiglia.
- Ghost Dog: The Way of the Samurai (film)
- In Too Deep (film)
- Payback (film)
- The Boondock Saints (film)

== Deaths ==
- March 18 – Gerlando Sciascia "George from Canada", Bonanno Family Captain
- July 14 – Joseph Colozza, Gambino crime family Capo and Longshoreman labor union racketeer
- August 5 – Jimmy Brown (James Failla), Gambino crime family Capo and labor union racketeer
- August 25 – Louis R. Failla, Patriarca crime family soldier
