= 2001 in organized crime =

List of years in organized crime
- … 1991; 1992; 1993; 1994; 1995; 1996; 1997; 1998; 1999; 2000; 2001; 2002; 2003; 2004; 2005; 2006; 2007; 2008; 2009; 2010; 2011 …
- Art; Archaeology; Architecture; Literature; Music; Philosophy; Science; +...

== Events ==
- April 5 – Bonanno crime family consigliere Anthony Spero was convicted of racketeering and ordering the murders of Louis Tuzzio, Paul Gulino and Vincent Bickelman. Spero had supervised a violent Bonanno crew out of a Bath Beach, Brooklyn social club for more than 20 years.
- April 12 – The Italian magazine L’Espresso puts Matteo Messina Denaro on the cover with the legend: Ecco il nuovo capo della mafia (Here is the new boss of the Mafia).
- August 3 – Members of the Albanian Rudaj Organization attack Greek associates of the Lucchese crime family at a social club in a conflict over controlling gambling rackets in Astoria, Queens, New York City.
- November – Giovanni Riina, Sicilian mafioso and son of Salvatore Riina, convicted of committing four murders in 1995.
- December 6 – The U.S. Attorney's Office for the Eastern District of New York indicted members of the New Springville Boys gang from Staten Island, which prosecutors alleged was a mob farm team for the Bonanno and Colombo crime families. The crew was charged with burglarizing over 30 night-deposit boxes at banks across the country, netting $240,000, committing push-in robberies, loan sharking and money laundering. They were also charged with hijacking a truckload of marijuana worth over $1 million, and selling drugs in their neighborhood. Members included leader Lee D'Avanzo, Ned Bilali, Robert Catanese, Randy (Randy The Jew) Gordon, Francis Costanzo, William "Big Billy" Fauci, Joseph "Fat Joe" Gambino, and Edward Shamah.
- Tadamasa Goto, the founding head of the Goto-gumi, a large affiliate of the largest known yakuza syndicate, the Yamaguchi-gumi, got a queue-jumping liver transplant at the UCLA Medical Center in Los Angeles after giving a donation to the Center and getting a special visa deal from the FBI.

== Arts and literature ==
- The 51st State (film) starring Samuel L. Jackson and Robert Carlyle.
- Bandits (film)
- Blow (film) starring Johnny Depp, Penélope Cruz, Jordi Mollà, Cliff Curtis, Ethan Suplee and Ray Liotta
- The Cold Six Thousand (novel) by James Ellroy
- Corky Romano (film) starring Chris Kattan, Chris Penn and Vincent Pastore.
- The Fast and the Furious (film)
- Heist (film) starring Gene Hackman and Danny DeVito.
- Knockaround Guys (film) starring Barry Pepper, Seth Green, Vin Diesel and John Malkovich
- The Mexican (film) starring Brad Pitt, Julia Roberts, Gene Hackman and James Gandolfini
- The Score (film)
- Swordfish (film)
- Training Day (film)

== Deaths ==
- February 21 – Alfred Embarrato "Uncle Al", Bonanno crime family Capo
- October 22 – Raffaele Quasarano, Detroit crime syndicate leader and associate of Frank Costello and Frank Coppola.
