= 1990 in organized crime =

| List of years in organized crime |
- … 1980; 1981; 1982; 1983; 1984; 1985; 1986; 1987; 1988; 1989; 1990; 1991; 1992; 1993; 1994; 1995; 1996; 1997; 1998; 1999; 2000 …
- Art; Archaeology; Architecture; Literature; Music; Philosophy; Science; +...

== Events ==
- August 30 - The body of Lucchese Family mobster Bruno Facciolo, who had been missing since August 24, is discovered in the trunk of a car in the Bay Ridge section of Brooklyn, following an anonymous complaint to police of foul odor. He had been shot several times in the head, and stabbed multiple times in the chest and back.
- September 28 – English drug trafficker Roy Francis Adkins is shot dead in Amsterdam.
- December 11 – The FBI arrests Gambino crime family boss John Gotti, underboss Salvatore "Sammy the Bull" Gravano and consigliere Frank Locascio on racketeering charges.

== Arts and literature ==
- Dick Tracy – (film)
- The Godfather Part III (film) starring Al Pacino, Diane Keaton, Talia Shire, Andy García, Joe Mantegna and Sophia Coppola
- Goodfellas (film) starring Ray Liotta, Robert De Niro, Joe Pesci, Lorraine Bracco, Paul Sorvino, Mike Starr and Frank Vincent.
- King of New York – (film) starring Christopher Walken, David Caruso, Laurence Fishburne, Wesley Snipes and Steve Buscemi.
- The Krays (film) starring Gary Kemp and Martin Kemp.
- The Lost Capone (film) starring Adrian Pasdar, Eric Roberts, Anthony Crivello and Dominic Chianese.
- Miller's Crossing – (film) starring Gabriel Byrne, John Turturro, Jon Polito, Mike Starr and Steve Buscemi.
- Mob Story (film)
- My Blue Heaven (film) starring Steve Martin, Rick Moranis and Joan Cusack.
- Payback (film)
- State of Grace (film) starring Sean Penn, Ed Harris, Gary Oldman and John Turturro.
- Boiling Point (film)

== Deaths ==
- Bruno Facciolo, Lucchese crime family member
- February 4 – Anthony DiLapi, Lucchese crime family soldier (53)
- September 28 – Roy Francis Adkins, English gangster and drug trafficker (42)
