= 2003 in organized crime =

List of years in organized crime
- … 1993; 1994; 1995; 1996; 1997; 1998; 1999; 2000; 2001; 2002; 2003; 2004; 2005; 2006; 2007; 2008; 2009; 2010; 2011; 2012; 2013 …
- Art; Archaeology; Architecture; Literature; Music; Philosophy; Science; +...

== Events ==
- August 11 – Susumu Kajiyama, a former senior member of a yakuza gang affiliated with the Yamaguchi-gumi, who was dubbed the "loan shark kingpin", was arrested in Japan for loan sharking.
- August 19 – A bar located in Kitakyushu, Fukuoka, Japan and managed by an anti organized crime campaign leader was attacked with a hand grenade by a yakuza member. The perpetrator, a member of the Kudo-kai, died shortly after the attack by apparently committing suicide.
- Despite successful prosecutions against the Genovese, Lucchese and Gambino crime families, The New York Times is critical of federal officials claims of the "death" of organized crime in New York states "Reports of its death have been greatly exaggerated. For more than (sic) two decades, law enforcement officials have declared that the latest round of mob indictments would put the nail in the coffin of the Mafia."

== Art and literature ==
- Double Deal: The Inside Story of Murder, Unbridled Corruption, and the Cop Who Was a Mobster, written by authors Sam Giancana and Michael Corbitt, is published.
- Mafia Wife: My Story of Love, Murder, and Madness, co-written by Lynda Milito and author Reg Potterton, is published (Milito being the wife of disappeared former Gambino capo Louis Milito).
- 2 Fast 2 Furious (film)
- Confidence (film)
- Cradle 2 the Grave (film)
- SWAT (film)
- The Italian Job (Remake, film)
- Veronica Guerin (film)
