= Curcio (surname) =

Curcio is an Italian surname. Notable people with the surname include:

- Alessio Curcio (born 1990), Italian football player
- Anthony Curcio (born 1980), American convicted criminal and motivational speaker
- Emanuele Curcio (born 1953), Italian football player
- Fabrizio Curcio (born 1966), Italian government official
- Felipe Curcio (born 1993), Brazilian football player
- Fernando Curcio (born 1981), Uruguayan football player
- Frank Curcio (1912–1988), Australian rules footballer
- Gus Curcio (born 1951), American businessman
- Juan Curcio (1551–1628), Belgian gunpowder manufacturer
- Maria Crocifissa Curcio (1877–1957), Italian religious sister
- Maria Curcio (1918 or 1919–2009), Italian classical pianist
- Michael Curcio (born 1982), American politician
- Mike Curcio (born 1957), American linebacker
- Pat Curcio (born 1973), Canadian ice hockey coach
- Renato Curcio (born 1941), Italian left-wing terrorist
- Roberto Curcio (1912–1992), Italian pentathlete
- Vincenzo Curcio (born c. 1960), Italian Mafioso
