= 2006 in organized crime =

== Events ==
=== January ===
- January 8 – Carmen Milano, underboss of the Los Angeles crime family died of a heart attack in Las Vegas.
- January 13 – Ranking Chicago Outfit member, Joseph "Joey the Clown" Lombardo, was arrested by FBI agents in Elmwood Park, Illinois.

=== February ===
- February 6 – Australian gangland figure Mario Condello is shot dead outside his home in Melbourne, marking the first gangland-related murder in the city in nearly two years.
- February 20 – Kansas City mob boss Anthony Civella died of natural causes.

=== March ===
- March 17 – Spanish authorities arrest approximately 300 individuals in a nationwide operation targeting a Romanian-led criminal network involved in drug trafficking, fraud, robbery, and prostitution.
- March 23 – Police arrested dozens of people in several regions of Italy, as well as Spain and Morocco, and seized more than 20 tonnes of cocaine and 17,000 tonnes of hashish in an international drug trafficking ring, involving the Calabrian Mafia ('Ndrangheta) and criminal groups in Latin America and Morocco
- March [day unknown/disputed(?)] - 10 members of at least two of New York's five families (some sources citing from the Bonanno and the Lucchese crime families; others suggesting the Gambino crime family) arrested for stock manipulation. {Conflicting sources: & }
- March 27 – 4 persons found shot dead in Catanzaro, Calabria, Italy with no indications of motive for the murders.
- March 27 – A narco submarine being constructed on the orders of the Calabrian mafia ('Ndrangheta), to transport cocaine from Colombia to Italy seized.
- March 27 – The two sons of former mobster, Francesco "Frank" Frassetto, pleaded guilty to drugs charges in court; both claiming the involvement of their father.
- March 28 – 17 arrested for drug trafficking in Reggio di Calabria, Calabria, Italy
- March 30 – Gambino crime family acting underboss, Anthony Megale, pleaded guilty to extortion charges.
- March 31 – Cleveland mob boss turned government informant, Angelo Lonardo, died of natural causes.

=== April ===
- April - Sicilian mafia boss Salvatore Riina stood trial for the murder of Mauro De Mauro, a reporter who disappeared in 1970.
- April 4 – Bernardo Provenzano mentioned Matteo Messina Denaro as a possible successor as boss of the Sicilian Mafia. However this fact was only realized after Provenzano's capture when police deciphered messages sent between Provenzano and other mobsters. This presupposes that Provenzano has the power to nominate a successor, which is not unanimously accepted among Mafia observers. "The Mafia today is more of a federation and less of an authoritarian state," according to anti-Mafia prosecutor Antonio Ingroia of the Direzione distrettuale antimafia (DDA) of Palermo, referring to the previous period of authoritarian rule under Salvatore Riina.
- April 6 – NYPD officers, Louis Eppolito and Stephen Caracappa, were convicted for the murders of 8 men on the orders of mobsters.
- April 11 – Sicilian mafia boss, Bernardo Provenzano, captured by police outside of Corleone after more than 40 years of hiding. Several mafiosi were mentioned as his successor. Among the rivals were Matteo Messina Denaro (from Castelvetrano and the province of Trapani), Salvatore Lo Piccolo (boss of Tommaso Natale area and the mandamento of San Lorenzo in Palermo), and Domenico Raccuglia from Altofonte. Provenzano allegedly nominated Messina Denaro in one of his pizzini – small slips of paper used to communicate with other mafiosi to avoid phone conversations, found at Provenzano's hide out.
- April 13 – National Police arrested a Moroccan man Tarifa, Cádiz province, Spain, for alleged links to Cosa Nostra.
- April 13 – Salvatore Terracciano, head of a leading Camorra clan, arrested with 11 other family members and associates.
- April 13 – Giuseppe Arena, head of a 'Ndrangheta clan in Catanzaro, Calabria, arrested alongside his "right hand man", Francesco Gentile.
- April 14 – Five people arrested in Messina, Sicily in further investigations into Sicilian and Calabrese organized crime
- April 20 – Marco Rodolfo del Vento, financier and alleged front man for Sicilian mafia boss Biagio Crisafulli, arrested in the Balearic Islands.
- April 24 – Joseph Mastronardo was stopped on his way home from Florida and had $500,000 cash seized from his car and $2 million from his home.

=== May ===
- May 3 – Bernardo Provenzano went on trial via a videolink from a high security Italian prison.
- May 5 – Palermo shopkeepers dubbed 5 May "Pizzo Free Day", a celebration of independence from the Sicilian Mafia's Palermo protection racket.
- May 11 – Springfield, Massachusetts mobster Frank Depergola pleaded guilty to loansharking.
- May 12 – Sicilian mafia associate Ottavio Lo Cricchio had assets worth €30 million, including a horse race track, frozen by the Finance Police of Palermo.
- May 13 – Sicilian mafia associate Vincenzo Piazza had assets worth €17.5 million, including villas in Pozzillo and Cinisi, frozen by the Finance Police of Palermo.
- May 14 – Anti-mafia magistrate Giuseppe Narducci called for all Italian football "elites" (players, managers, coaches etc.) to help investigations into corruption in the Serie A division. The leading Turin-based Juventus FC and Rome-based S.S. Lazio were both under investigation.
- May 15 – New York-Cleveland mobster Gregory De Palma went on trial for racketeering.
- May 17 – Camorra crime boss Paulo Di Lauro was sentenced to 30 years imprisonment on charges of mafia association, extortion and drug smuggling.
- May 18 – A three-day forum on identity theft and fraud, including mob turncoat Michael Franzese as a guest speaker, was launched for police in the Gold Country Casino, Butte County, California.
- May 22 – Two NYPD officers, Louis Eppolito and Stephen Caracappa, who worked as mob hitmen for Lucchese crime family underboss, Anthony Casso, were sentenced for their roles in the murder of several men between 1986 and 1990; Eppolito for life plus 100 years, Caracappa for life plus 80 years.
- May 26 – Sicilian mafia turncoat Francesco Marino Mannoia was awarded €1 million to start a legitimate business.
- May 28 – Rita Borsellino, antimafia politician and sister of late antimafia magistrate Paolo Borsellino, lost to Salvatore Cuffaro, incumbent president and alleged mafia associate, in the 2006 Regional Election of Sicily.
- May 31 – Joseph Vito Mastronardo and John V. Mastronardo were charged with bookmaking and criminal conspiracy.

=== June ===
- June 5 – Louis Eppolito and Stephen Caracappa sentenced to life imprisonment but had the verdict postponed until June 23.
- June 6 – Gambino crime family captain Gregory DePalma convicted of racketeering.
- June 7 – Transcripts of recordings of mobster Frank Calabrese, Sr. by his mobster-turned-government-witness son Frank Calabrese, Jr. released.
- June 7 – Buffalo crime family associate Leonard Mordino and 10 others arrested in a cocaine ring.
- June 9 – Sicilian criminal Domenico Farina murdered in Catania.
- June 9 – Matthew Ianniello indicted in Connecticut for collecting $500,000 from a corrupt trash collector.
- June 10 – The alleged boss of the Messina based Tortoriciani clan Francesco Cannizzo had property worth €1.2 million confiscated.
- June 12 – Sicilian mobster Salvatore Lupo arrested in Catania by the piazza Dante Unit Carabinieri.
- June 12 – New Jersey mobster Stefano Vitabile sentenced to life imprisonment for ordering the murder of one time boss John D'Amato. D'Amato was a homosexual, an offence punishable by death. In court the killer, Anthony Capo explained "Nobody's gonna respect us if we have a gay homosexual boss sitting down discussing La Cosa Nostra business,".
- June 16 – Gambino crime family associate and "Corporation" crime family leader Alex Rudaj sentenced to 27 years for racketeering and extortion.
- June 16 – The French leader in organized crime Jacky Imbert, "Mad Jacky", was sentenced to four years for extorting from Paris businessmen in the early 1990s, in Marseille.
- June 19 – Frank D. Frassetto admitted in federal court to conspiring with his son Phillip M. Frassetto to distribute a kilogram of cocaine.
- June 19 – Italian MP Gaspare Giudice charged with mafia association.
- June 20 – Italian authorities issued 52 arrest warrants against the top echelon of Cosa Nostra in the city of Palermo (Operation Gotha). Study of the pizzini showed that Provenzano's joint deputies in Palermo were Salvatore Lo Piccolo and Antonio Rotolo, capo mandamento of Pagliarelli. In a message referring to an important decision for Cosa Nostra, Provenzano told Rotolo: "It's up to you, me and Lo Piccolo to decide this thing." The investigations showed that Rotolo had built a kind of federation within the mafia, comprising 13 families grouped in four clans. His right-hand men were Antonio Cinà—who used to be the personal physician of Salvatore Riina and Provenzano – and the builder Francesco Bonura. The city of Palermo was ruled by this triumvirate replacing the Commission whose members are all in jail.
- June 21 – Italian police arrest 24 alleged members of Cosa Nostra in Palermo in coordinated raids aimed at preventing a potential internal power struggle following earlier leadership disruptions.
- June 30 – Spanish police dismantle an international Romanian criminal organization operating in multiple provinces, arresting dozens including a suspected senior leader involved in financial crimes and organized theft.

=== August ===
- August 10 – Several bones discovered by a farmer, in a property close to the hideout of Sicilian mafia boss Bernardo Provenzano, in Corleone. The property was dubbed a "mafia graveyard" after two jawbones, vertebrae, a breast bone with bullets wounds and two skulls with shotgun wounds are found buried in the soil. "The area has been impounded and a search of the field is taking place and will continue for the next few days. The suspicion is that further bodies will be discovered." said Corleone prosecutor Alberto Di Pisa.
- August 10 – The United States Court of Appeals for the First Circuit upheld the reduced sentence handed down to Massachusetts mafia captain Vincent M. Ferrara by the United States District Court for the District of Massachusetts in 2005.
- August 11 – Anti-mafia investigations on Union of Christian Democrats representative member Onofrio Fratello concluded with a one and a half prison sentence.
- August 17 – The reputed head of the Montreal Cosa Nostra, Vito Rizzuto, was extradited to the US to face murder and racketeering charges related to the 1981 murder of 3 Bonanno crime family captains; Dominick Trinchera, Philip Giaccone and Alphonse Indelicato.

=== September ===
- September - 18-year-old Salvatore Montani, a relative of jailed Bari/Apulia crime boss Andrea Montani, was killed in a gangland slaying.
- September 4 – Anthony "Little Tony" Zizzo (71) disappeared. His car was found in Melrose Park, but there was no sign of foul play.
- September 5 – Neapolitan mafiosi Raffaele Caldarelli was arrested in London after evading authorities for more than 10 years.
- September 20 – Bonanno crime family captains Peter Calabrese and Louis Attanasio pleaded guilty to the 1984 murder of Cesare Bonventre. They were both sentenced to 15 years in federal prison.
- September 26 – Founders of the Cali Cartel, Gilberto and Miguel Rodríguez Orejuela, plead guilty in a U.S. court to conspiring to import large quantities of cocaine and are sentenced to 30 years in prison.

=== October ===
- Clarence "Chauncey" Smaldone, the reputed head of the mafia in Denver, Colorado, died (mid-October) of natural causes. He was preceded in death by his two brothers Eugene "Checkers" Smaldone and Clyde "Flip Flop" Smaldone with whom he ran the family for many years.
- October 30 – Giovanni Montani, a young footballer, was shot dead in Bari. Although a seemingly innocent victim, Montani's imprisoned uncle Andrea Montani was the allegedly the head of a dominant Sacra Corona Unita crime family in the Bari area of Apulia. Giovanni Montani's cousin Salvatore Montani was shot dead in September of this year.
- Palermo Financial Police confiscated goods and real estate worth €104 million from Sicilian businessman Angelo Prisinzano for mafia related criminal association. Two others had assets confiscated; all three had been under investigation since February 2005.
- October 31 – Pittsburgh mob boss Michael James Genovese died of natural causes at the age of 87.
- October 31 – 3 people were killed in Naples in what appeared to be a bloody turf war involving two Camorra groups for control of the drug trade.

Prodi steps in as Mafia war rages out of control - Times Online Fear rules Naples as mob killers run riot | World news | The Observer

- October 31 – All eleven of the prosecutors leading anti-mafia investigations in Catania, Sicily, resigned this week because of the severe lack of funding causing them to personally finance the operations.

=== November ===
- November 2 – A man was stabbed in Naples, leaving him in a serious condition in hospital.
- November 3 – The Italian government pledged to post 1000 extra police officers in Naples after the spate of violence that saw 12 people killed in 10 days.
- November 6 – Italian business man, Angelo Cottarelli, was found in his home, still alive but with his neck cut to near decapitation, his family dead. It seemed that Cottarelli was made to watch his family die before his throat was cut and he was left to die. The attacks was perpetrated, it seemed, by the 'Ndrangheta.
- November 22 – Canadian law enforcement carry out one of the largest anti-mafia operations in the country, arresting dozens of individuals linked to the Rizzuto crime family and filing over 1,000 charges including drug trafficking, extortion, and attempted murder.

== Arts and literature ==
- The Departed (film) starring Leonardo DiCaprio, Matt Damon and Jack Nicholson
- Find Me Guilty (film) starring Vin Diesel.
- HIGH: Confessions of a Pot Smuggler (autobiography) by Brian O'Dea
- The Godfather: The Game (videogame)
- Lucky Number Slevin (film) starring Josh Hartnett, Bruce Willis, Lucy Liu, Morgan Freeman and Stanley Tucci.
- Scarface: The World is Yours (videogame)
- The Godfather's Revenge (novel) by Mark Winegardner
- 10th & Wolf (film)
- Harsh Times (film)
- Inside Man (film)
- Miami Vice (film)
- Running Scared (film)
- Triad Election (film)

== Deaths ==
- January 3 – Carmen Milano, Los Angeles crime family underboss
- February 19 – NYPD detective, Kenneth McCabe, who investigated the American mafia.
- February 20 – Kansas City mob boss, Anthony Civella.
- February 27 – Former Union City mayor William Musto.
- March 5 – Mafia hitman, Richard Kuklinski.
- March 31 – Cleveland mob boss, Angelo Lonardo.
- June 11 – Head of the Justice Department's Organized Crime and Racketeering Section, William G. Hundley.
- September - Salvatore Montani, Neapolitan civilian or small-time criminal, relative of mafiosi Andrea Montani
- September 4 – The Chicago Outfit's Southside Crew boss, Anthony Zizzo (missing)
- October 16 – Denver mob boss Clarence Smaldone Clarence "Chauncey" Smaldone
- October 30 – Neapolitan civilian, Giovanni Montani, relative of suspected criminals Salvatore and Andrea Montani
- October 31 – Pittsburgh mob boss Michael James Genovese
- October 31 – 3 Neapolitan criminals and civilians
- November 6 – Italian business man and 'Ndrangheta associate Angelo Cottarelli and his family
- December 31 – John Ardito "Buster", Genovese crime family Capo
