= Velentzas =

Velentzas may refer to:

== People ==
- Lefteris Velentzas (born 1970), Greek footballer
- Giorgos Velentzas (1927–2015), Greek actor

== Other uses ==
- Velentzas Organization, Greek-American criminal organization
