= Minghella =

Minghella is an Italian surname. Notable people with the surname include:

- Anthony Minghella (1954–2008), English filmmaker and playwright, father of Max
- Dominic Minghella (born 1967), English television producer and screenwriter, brother of Anthony
- Loretta Minghella (born 1962), English academic administrator and charity executive, sister of Anthony
- Max Minghella (born 1985), English actor, son of Anthony
- Maurizio Minghella (born 1958), Italian serial killer
