= John Ardito =

John Gregory Ardito
- Born: October 30, 1919; New York City, U.S.
- Died: December 31, 2006 (aged 87)
- Other name: Buster

John Gregory "Buster" Ardito (October 30, 1919 – December 31, 2006) was an American caporegime in the Genovese crime family who worked in the Bronx borough of New York.

Born in Columbia Street Waterfront District, Cobble Hill, Brooklyn, Ardito married Fay Cerasi and was the father of John and Annette Ardito. He stood at 5'9 and weighed 160 pounds. His legitimate profession was as part owner of a butcher shop at 590 East 156th Street in South Bronx. Ardito was involved in extortion, loan sharking, and illegal gambling operations. His arrest record included seduction, possession of counterfeit currency, and narcotics possession.

After joining the Genovese family, Ardito became a button man, or killer, in the crew of Michele Miranda. Miranda eventually became the family consigliere under boss Vito Genovese and help run the family while Genovese was in prison. A later indictment alleged that Ardito once ordered a beating on a debtor who owed him $150,000. During a 1983 trial for Genovese mobster Gus Curcio, Curcio collapsed in court with what seemed like a heart attack. However, Federal Bureau of Investigation (FBI) surveillance recorded that Ardito had secretly passed some medications that simulated cardiac problems to Curcio to delay the trial. In 1985, Ardito was sent to federal prison for conspiracy to obstruct justice. In 1991, Ardito was released from prison.

In 2003, the FBI started using electronic surveillance to record many of Ardito's meetings in several Bronx restaurants. After Ardito discovered one of the devices, he started holding his meetings in retail shops, medical offices, cars, and boats. Later on, the FBI also started bugging Ardito's home phone. Reportedly, the FBI was even able to turn on Ardito's cell phone without his knowledge and use that as a listening device.

In 2006, using this surveillance information, the government charged Ardito, Genovese captain Liborio Bellomo, and other Genovese family members with labor racketeering and other charges. The racketeering charge involved New York Local 102 of the Bakery, Confectionery and Tobacco Workers' Union and New York Local 15 of the International Union of Operating Engineers. On December 25, 2006, due to failing health, Ardito was released on bail while awaiting trial on these racketeering charges. On December 31, 2006, Ardito died from pancreatic cancer.
