= Albanian Boys =

Albanian-American street gang

- Founded: 1991; 35 years ago
- Founding location: The Bronx, New York, U.S.
- Years active: 1991–1990s
- Territory: The Bronx, Staten Island
- Ethnicity: Albanian American
- Membership: c.100
- Activities: Gang violence, robbery, extortion
- Allies: Rudaj Organization
- Rivals: MS-13

The Albanian Boys, also known as the Albanian Bad Boys or Albanian Boys Inc. were a gang of Albanians who operated in central Bronx. The gang was founded in the Bronx, New York in 1991. Over the years of its existence, the gang has evolved from a youth ethnic street gang that defended its members from similar ethnic street gangs to subcontractors working for local organized crime, engaging in extortion, intimidation, protection money and debt collection.

== See also ==
- Rudaj Organization
- Albanian mafia
