= Alexander Stille =

American author and journalist

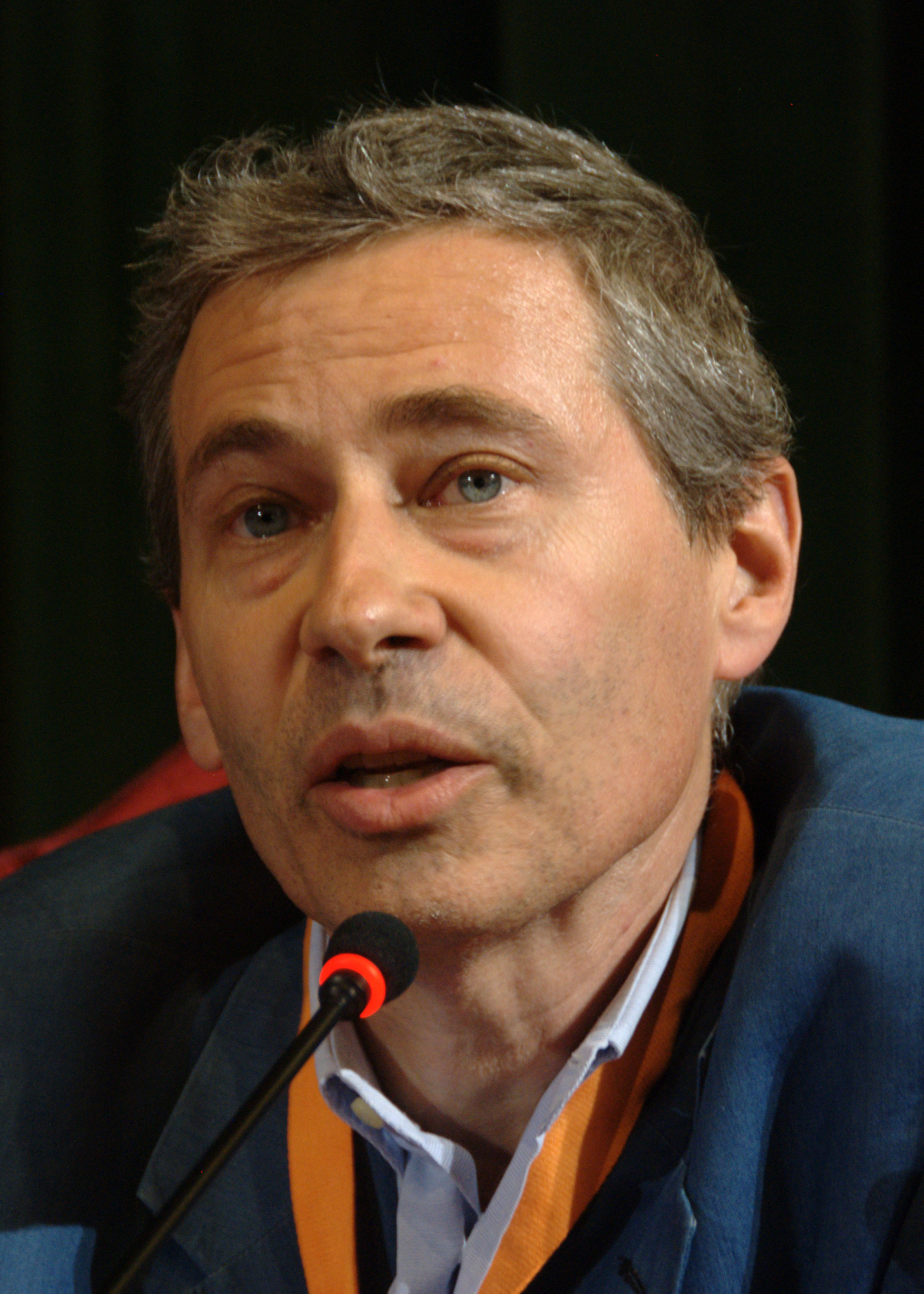
Alexander Stille at the Festival of Economics 2010 in Trento, Italy

Alexander Stille (born January 1, 1957, in New York City) is an American author and journalist.

== Early life and education ==
He is the son of Elizabeth and Michael U. Stille. Michael was a Russian-born journalist who was the longtime American correspondent for and later chief editor of Milan's Corriere della Sera newspaper. Alexander graduated from Yale and the Columbia University Graduate School of Journalism.

== Career ==
=== Works ===
Stille has written several books and numerous articles about Italy's history, culture, and politics, and the legacy of the Mafia. His writing has appeared in publications including the New York Times, La Repubblica, The New Yorker, The New York Review of Books, The New York Times Magazine, the Atlantic Monthly, The New Republic, The Correspondent, U.S. News & World Report, The Boston Globe, and the Toronto Globe and Mail.

Stille's first book, Benevolence and Betrayal: Five Italian Jewish Families Under Fascism, won the Los Angeles Times book award and was chosen by the Times Literary Supplement as one of the best books of 1992. In it, Stille recounts the histories of several Italian families to explore the "paradoxical quality of Jewish life in fascist Italy—a highly tolerant country that suddenly embraced anti-Semitism, the chief ally of Nazi Germany, which had staunchly refused to cooperate with the deportation of Jews." He ultimately shows how the "experience of Italian Jews" during fascist rule entailed "a strange mixture of benevolence and betrayal, persecution and rescue" that distinguished it from most of the rest of Europe. Herbert Mitgang wrote in the New York Times, "The result ... is an achievement that deserves to stand next to the most insightful fiction about life and death under Fascism."

In 1995, Stille published an examination of more recent Italian history: Excellent Cadavers: The Mafia and the Death of the First Italian Republic, an investigation into the Sicilian Mafia in the latter half of the 20th century. It focuses on the events leading up to the major crackdown against the criminal organization in the 1990s following the bloodthirsty reign of Salvatore Riina and was dedicated in part to the memory of anti-mafia judges Giovanni Falcone and Paolo Borsellino. Calling Stille "a writer to watch", Richard Bernstein described Excellent Cadavers in the New York Times as an "absorbing, detailed history" that was "meticulously researched". The events outlined in the book were turned into two movies of the same name: a fictionalized 1999 HBO Pictures account, starring Chazz Palminteri as Falcone, and a 2005 documentary directed by Marco Turco.

In The Future of the Past (2002), Stille considers how people relate to history in a constantly evolving world. "Trying to show the double-edged nature of technological change in a series of different contexts and from a number of odd angles", he appraised subjects as varied as historical monuments in Egypt, China, and Italy, environmental preservation efforts in India and Madagascar, and repositories of collective knowledge, including the Vatican Library and the U.S. National Archives. Stille "chose to avoid arguing a particular thesis". In a review, Michiko Kakutani called the book "fascinating but helter-skelter," a "book in which the parts are much more interesting than the whole".

Stille revisited his first two books' focus on Italy in The Sack of Rome: How a Beautiful European Country with a Fabled History and a Storied Culture Was Taken Over by a Man Named Silvio Berlusconi (2006). In a review of the book's examination of Berlusconi's transformation from a real estate and media mogul into Italy's prime minister, Publishers Weekly praised Stille for having "exquisitely analyzed not only contemporary Italian culture but [also] the ominous rise of an international political culture in which figures such as Berlusconi can flourish". Interest in the book was rekindled during and after the 2016 U.S. presidential election campaign; for example, MSNBC's Chris Hayes said he had read it "a few days after Trump was elected" because Stille's profile of Berlusconi suggested "the closest modern analogue" to Trump's ascendancy he could think of. Stille himself considered the comparison in a 2016 essay for The Intercept, noting that "both [Trump and Berlusconi] are billionaires who made their initial fortunes in real estate, whose wealth and playboy lifestyles turned them into celebrities" with "improbable inter-class appeal", while also exploring how "the almost total deregulation of broadcast media" in Italy and the U.S. helped create conditions that each of them could use to their political advantage.

In The Force of Things: A Marriage in War and Peace (2013), a work supported by a Guggenheim Fellowship that also won the 2014 Blake-Dodd Prize for Nonfiction from the American Academy of Arts and Letters, Stille turned his investigative reporting skills to his family and produced a book that is part memoir, part dual biography of his parents—his journalist father, "a refugee of two countries" who had fled both the Russian Revolution and Italian fascism, and his mother with her "midwestern, white Anglo-Saxon Protestant" background. In the New York Times, Kakutani wrote that Stille's portrayal of his parents' "distressing tale of marital woe becomes a fascinating psychological study of two people with complicated family pasts, trying to forge identities of their own—two people with utterly different views and experiences of history."

In The Sullivanians: Sex, Psychotherapy, and the Wild Life of an American Commune (2023), Stille examines the turbulent history of a radical psychotherapy group, the Sullivan Institute for Research in Psychoanalysis, whose "founders wanted to start a revolution ... grounded in ideals of creative expression, sexual liberation, and freedom from societal norms" and by the 1960s had become "an urban commune of hundreds of people [on Manhattan's Upper West Side], with patients living with other patients, leading creative, polyamorous lives." Stille chronicles how this idealistic endeavor quickly "devolved from a radical communal experiment into an insular cult, with therapists controlling virtually every aspect of their patients' lives, from where they lived to how often they saw their children." Publishers Weekly called The Sullivanians "an intimate and engrossing look at the ... group that emerged in 1950s New York City and Amagansett, Long Island" and eventually drew in "celebrity followers [that] included novelists Richard Elman and Richard Price, singer Judy Collins, and art critic Clement Greenberg, who recruited painters Jackson Pollock and [Jules] Olitski." Praising Stille's use of "candid interviews with ex-members and their children", the review concludes that the work is a "doggedly researched and thoroughly compassionate ... page-turning exposé" of the community's rise and fall.

=== Teaching ===
Stille is the San Paolo Professor of International Journalism at the Columbia School of Journalism.

== Bibliography ==
- Stille, Alexander (1991). Benevolence and Betrayal: Five Italian Jewish Families Under Fascism. Picador. ISBN 0671671529.
- Stille, Alexander (1995). Excellent Cadavers: The Mafia and the Death of the First Italian Republic. Pantheon. ISBN 0679425799.
- Stille, Alexander (2002). The Future of the Past. Farrar, Straus and Giroux. ISBN 0374159777.
- Stille, Alexander (2006). The Sack of Rome: How a Beautiful European Country with a Fabled History and a Storied Culture Was Taken Over by a Man named Silvio Berlusconi. Penguin. ISBN 159420053X.
- Stille, Alexander (2013). The Force of Things: A Marriage in War and Peace. Farrar, Straus and Giroux. ISBN 9780374157425.
- Stille, Alexander (2023). The Sullivanians: Sex, Psychotherapy, and the Wild Life of an American Commune. Farrar, Straus and Giroux. ISBN 9780374600396.
