= Murder of Lorenzo Cutugno =

The murder of Lorenzo Cutugno was committed in Turin, Italy on 11 April 1978. The victim was a member of the Polizia Penitenziaria assigned to the Turin prisons, ambushed by the Red Brigades during the period known as the Years of Lead.

== History ==
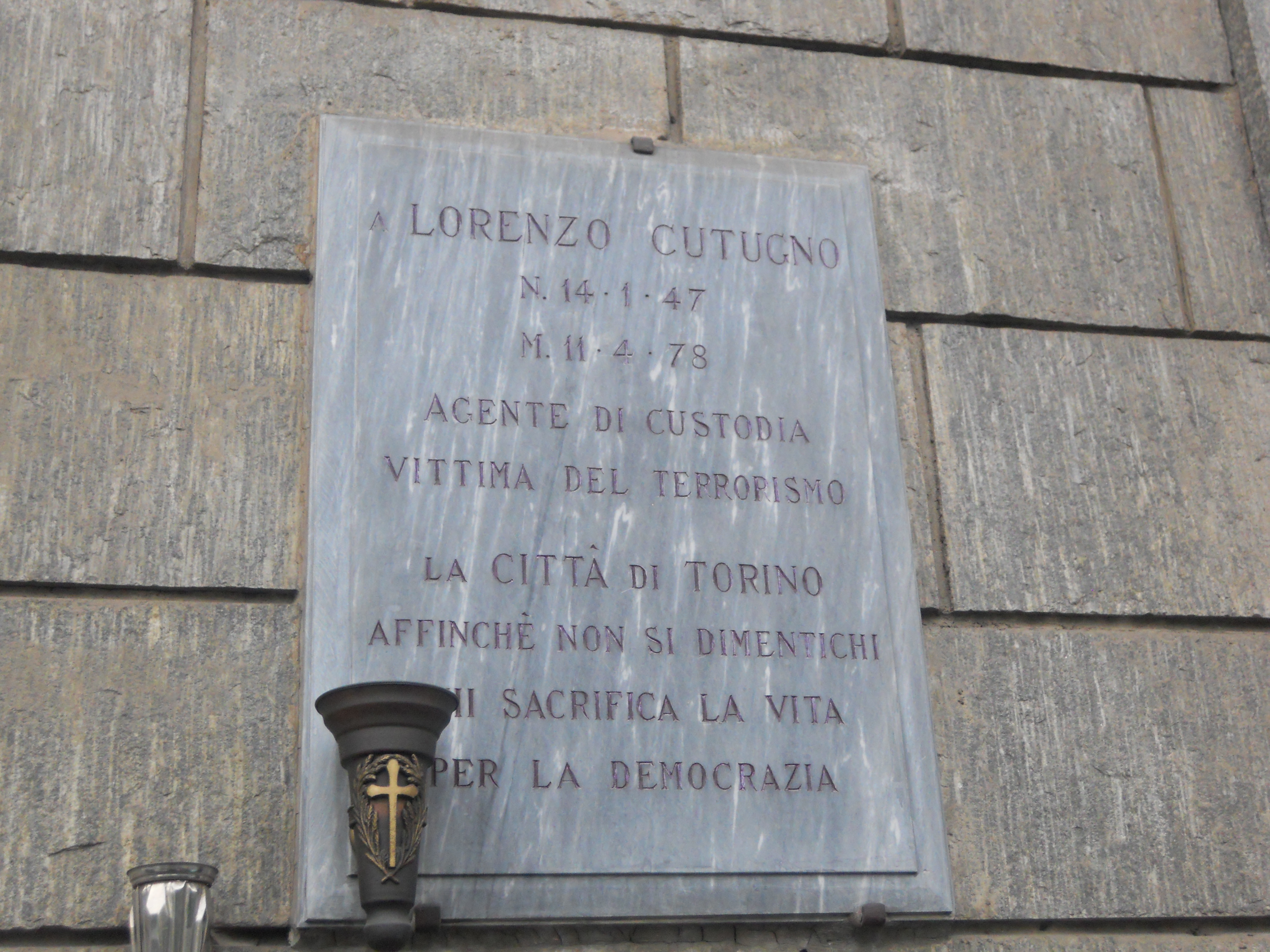
Commemorative plaque of the ambush in the Lungo Dora Napoli area, in Turin.

On the morning of 11 April 1978, Cutugno was leaving the building where he lived at Lungo Dora Napoli 60, to go to work. As Cutugno emerged from the elevator, two Red Brigades members, Cristoforo Piancone and Nadia Ponti, repeatedly shot him in the legs with the aim of kneecapping him. Although already wounded, Cutugno dragged himself out of the entrance hall and shot the two fleeing terrorists, managing to hit both.

Patrizio Peci, a Red Brigades terrorist who turned informant, later wrote that Cutugno initially shot only Piancone, his male assailant, and not Ponti, a woman, seriously wounding Piancone. When Ponti prepared to shoot Cutugno again, Cutugno and Ponti fired at the same time, with Cutugno wounding Ponti in the arm and thigh. A third terrorist who was waiting in a stolen car, Vincenzo Acella, intervened and shot the wounded policeman from behind, in the heart and head. Peci wrote of Cutugno's actions before his death, "I must say that that Cutugno has shown that he has two big balls like this".

Cristoforo Piancone, left in a hospital emergency room by his comrades, was arrested and convicted of six murders and two attempted murders. He was the first Red Brigades member of those who were carrying out an extensive terror campaign in Turin to be identified and arrested.

The Turin prison at Le Vallette, today Lorusso e Cutugno Prison, has carried the names of Cutugno and of Giuseppe Lorusso, another prison officer killed in Turin in 1979, since 2003. A plaque was unveiled at its entrance on 27 September 2019.

== See also ==
- Terrorism in Italy
