= Vincenzo Curcio =

- Born: c. 1960
- Known for: Escaping from Turin prison using dental floss
- Status: Convicted
- Allegiance: Sicilian Mafia
- Criminal charges: Murder (one conviction, arranged seven others)
- Capture status: Recaptured on July 11, 2000

Details
- Imprisoned at: Lorusso e Cutugno Prison, Turin

Vincenzo Curcio (born c. 1960), a member of the Sicilian Mafia, is famous for escaping from his cell in the Lorusso e Cutugno Prison in Turin by sawing through the bars of his cell with a piece of dental floss on March 17, 2000.

== Biography ==
Curcio was convicted of one murder and arranging seven others. The jail had been built in the 1970s and was designed to withstand outside attacks rather than breakouts, and as such the bars were made of iron low in carbon which were ductile but easy to saw through. Curcio tied bedsheets together and climbed down to the ground, scaling the outer fence to gain his freedom.

On July 11, 2000, Curcio was captured in Pancalieri, in the Province of Turin.
