= Maurizio Minghella =

Italian serial killer (born 1958)

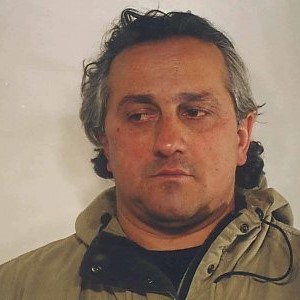
- Police mugshot of Minghella taken after his 2001 arrest
- Born: 16 July 1958 (age 68); Genoa, Italy
- Penalty: Life imprisonment

Details
- Victims: 15
- Span of crimes: 1978–2001
- Country: Italy
- Date apprehended: March 7, 2001

Maurizio Minghella (born 16 July 1958) is an Italian serial killer, sentenced to life in prison for the murders of ten sex workers in Turin between 1997 and 2001 when he was on parole for killing five young women in his hometown in 1978. He had also been convicted of robbery, kidnapping and escape from prison.

== Biography ==
Maurizio Minghella was born in Genoa in 1958, living in Val Polcevera, Bolzaneto district. When he was six, his mother separated from her husband and took care of the five children by herself. Later, she married a new man who beat the entire family. Minghella began to deeply hate his stepfather, defining it later, during his first interrogation, with these words:

"He was an alcoholic and beat us badly. I hated him a lot, I often dreamed of killing him, pulling a rope around his neck from behind his back."

He attended school without being able to pass the second grade, and at age 12 he still attended the first grade. At school, he took his companions by their necks and dragged them by their noses or mouths. Leaving school, he began to do small jobs including being a tiler, even though he often stole scooters, motorbikes and cars on the roads of Val Polcevera and the surrounding areas. Minghella was always seen with different girls and had been nicknamed the "Travolta of Val Polcevera" for his passion towards disco music. He was also passionate about boxing, but was driven away from it after he unscrupulously beat up another gym patron.

An event that heavily impacted his psyche was the death of his brother, who died in a car crash.

Following this, Minghella began to develop a morbid attraction to the dead. Reformed by the conscription service for mental disorders, he married in 1977 "by chance, by chance", as he himself declared, 15-year-old Rosa Manfredi, who was dependent on psychotropic drugs. Their marriage was short-lived: Minghella frequently visited prostitutes, and the girl suffered from depression and a miscarriage. This further traumatized Minghella and his fragile personality. In 1978, he visited the psychiatric clinic of the University of Genoa, learning that his IQ was 70.

== The first murders ==
On 18 April 1978, Minghella killed a 20-year-old prostitute named Anna Pagano in Genoa, then hid her corpse in the Sant'Olcese comune. The corpse was found by some shepherds, its head smashed and with a ballpoint pen embedded in the anus. Minghella also tried to misdirect the investigation by writing "Bricato Rose" instead of "Brigate Rosse" on the body, committing a spelling error which was immediately noticed by the police.

On 8 July, he killed 23-year-old Giusepinna Jerardi in Genoa in the same way and hid the body in a stolen abandoned car. On 18 July, he killed 14-year-old Maria Catena "Tina" Alba, whose naked body was found in Valbrevenna the next day, tied with a garrote to a tree. On 22 August, after a night at the disco, he killed 21-year-old Maria Strambelli, a saleswoman from Bari, whose body was found 3 days after her disappearance in the outskirts of Genoa.

The last victim was 19-year-old Wanda Scerra, a friend of Strambelli, who disappeared on 28 November. Her raped and strangled corpse was found in the escarpment that runs along the Genoa–Milan railway near Genoa.

== First arrest, trial and imprisonment ==
Minghella was arrested on the night between 5 and 6 December, confessing to the murders of Strambelli and Scerra, but denying his guilt in the others. Calligraphic expertise was required due to the attempted misdirection on Pagano's body. Both the writing and the pen used to sodomize the victim were connected back to Minghella. For the murder of Alba, a pair of glasses belonging to Minghella were found at the crime scene.

On 3 April 1981, he was sentenced by the Assizes court of Genoa to life imprisonment for five homicides, which was to be served at the maximum security prison in Porto Azzurro. In prison, he always proclaimed his innocence and in the eighties also requested a revision of the trial through Andrea Gallo. In 1995, at the age of 37, he obtained semi-liberty and was transferred to the Vallette prison in Turin. He entered the recovery community of Luigi Ciotti, and worked as a carpenter for the Abele Group.

== Murders between 1997 and 2001 ==
In March 1997, Minghella killed 53-year-old sex worker Loredana Maccario in a woman's home in the Turin neighbourhood of San Salvario.

In May, 20-year-old Moroccan sex worker Fatima H'Didou was raped and then strangled with the snare of a tracksuit in Caselette.

On 14 February 1998, he strangled 29-year-old Albanian sex worker Floreta Islami with a scarf in Rivoli.

On 30 January 1999, he strangled 73-year-old sex worker Cosima "Gina" Guido, from Taranto, with a scarf, in her apartment in the centre of Turin. On the stairs of the woman's pied-à-terre, two pieces of a kitchen towel with organic traces belonging to Minghella were found.

27-year-old Florentina "Tina" Motoc was killed on the night between 16 and 17 February 2001. She suffered brutal injuries to the face and head, with Minghella attempting to get rid of her clothes by starting a small bonfire.

Due to the last murder, Minghella's DNA traces, complete or partial impressions found in the places of the crimes, the similar modus operandi and the time slot in which the murders occurred (all after 5 o'clock), lead to the authorities arresting him.

== Second arrest and trial ==
Minghella was arrested on 7 March 2001, and the victims' cell phones were found with their registration numbers deleted. His own cell phone was traced to the area where Motoc was located on the evening of the crime. Imprisoned in the Vallette prison, he tried to escape through the laundry in the spring of 2001, but didn't manage to go past the first wall.

He was transferred to the Biella prison, and on the morning of 2 January 2003, he was hospitalized for chest and arm pain in the town's emergency room, managing to escape through a bath. Minghella was recaptured at 10 PM the same day near the train station.

Suspected in the murders of tens of victims who had worked as sex workers, but convicted for only four of them, on 4 April 2003, Maurizio Minghella was sentenced to life imprisonment by the Turin Assizes Court for the murder of Motoc and to 30 years for the murders of Guido and H'Didou. He is serving his sentence in a prison in Pavia. In March 2017, the Italian Supreme Court of Cassation condemned Minghella to thirty years of jail for the murder of Floreta Islami.

== See also ==
- List of serial killers by country
- List of serial killers by number of victims

== Bibliography ==
- Emanuela Profumo (2008). Liguria criminale (in Italian). Rome: Newton & Compton. ISBN 978-88-541-1239-1.
- Piero Abrate (2005). Il Piemonte del crimine (in Italian). Genoa: Ligurpress. ISBN 978-88-6406-004-0.
