= 2005 in organized crime =

== Events ==
- January 25 – Police raid various homes in Sicily and arrest forty-six Mafia suspects believed to be helping Bernardo Provenzano elude the authorities. Although they did not catch the elusive Mafia boss himself, investigators nonetheless unearthed evidence that 72-year-old Provenzano was still very much alive and in control of the Mafia, in the form of his cryptic handwritten notes, his preferred method of giving orders to his men.
- February 4 – Information about Bonanno crime family boss Joe Massino's cooperation with police for a reduced jail sentence is released to the press.
- February 9 – Susumu Kajiyama, a Japanese crime syndicate member dubbed the "loan shark king", was sentenced to seven years in prison for laundering money.
- April – Massachusetts mafia captain Vincent M. Ferrara has his jail sentence ended by a US District Court six years before the original set date due to prosecutor Jeffrey Auerhahn using an illegal court tactic. In 1992 Ferrara pleaded guilty to racketeering, extortion, gambling and ordering the 1985 murder of Vincent "Jimmy" Limoli. Ferrara had only agreed to plead guilty to the murder because he was presented with a witness, one Walter Jordan. The witness, however, recanted his testimony before Ferrara testified. Auerhahn did not tell Ferrara this and so the District Court overturned the sentence.
- April 4–17 reputed mafia figures, including two identified as soldiers of the Genovese and Bonanno crime families, arrested in New York City's Queens borough on gambling charges.
- June 23 – Turncoat Mafia leader Joe Massino is sentenced to life for racketeering, 7 counts of murder, arson, extortion, loan sharking, illegal gambling, conspiracy and money laundering.
- July 19 – Licio Gelli formally indicted by Roman magistrates for the 1982 murder of Roberto Calvi.
- September 21 – Chicago mobster, Albert Tocco dies of a stroke in prison.
- October – The trial of Giuseppe Calo and Licio Gelli for the murder of Italian banker Roberto Calvi begins.
- December 9 – Gambino crime family captain Carmine Sciandra was shot in the stomach after approaching a man outside his brother Salvatore's Staten Island Top Tomato store with a baseball bat. The shooter, Patrick Balsamo, had smashed the store's windows after his daughter, a former employee, complained that Salvatore had groped her. Accompanying Balsamo were Ronald "Ronnie Mozzarella" Carlucci, a Bonanno crime family soldier and Michael Viga, a Bonanno associate.
- December 19 – Genovese crime family boss, Vincent Gigante dies from complications of a heart disease in a federal prison hospital in Springfield, Missouri.

== Arts and literature ==
- June 14 – 10th Anniversary Full Frame Edition DVD of the 1995 film, Casino, released by Universal Studios Home Video
- Bullets Over Hollywood (TV documentary)
- Carlito's Way: Rise to Power (film) starring Jay Hernandez, Mario Van Peebles, Luis Guzmán, Sean Combs, Michael Kelly, Burt Young and Giancarlo Esposito.
- "Biography" – Empire of Crime: A Century of the New York Mob (TV documentary)
- A History of Violence (film)
- Lord of War (film)
- Revolver (film)
- The Ice Harvest (film)

== Deaths ==
- August 19 – Mahmood Ozdemir, UK Turkish crime boss
- September 21 – Albert Tocco, American mobster
- October 26 – Michael Rizzitello, Los Angeles crime family Capo
- November 30 – Lawrence Ricci, Genovese crime family Capo
- December 19 – Vincent Gigante "The Chin", Genovese crime family boss
