= Maria Crocifissa Curcio =

Italian religious sister and Blessed

Blessed Maria Crocifissa Curcio CMST
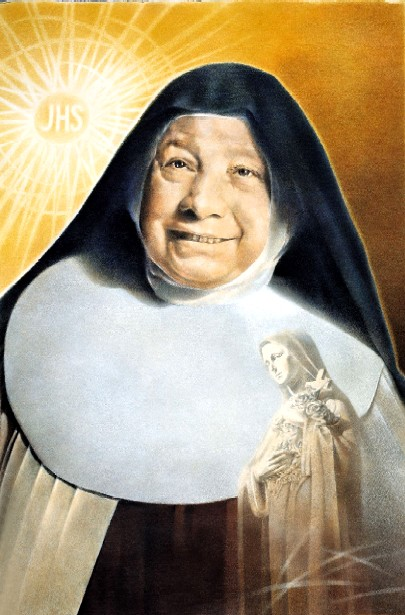

Virgin
- Born: 30 January 1877; Ispica, Ragusa, Kingdom of Italy
- Died: 4 July 1957 (aged 80); Santa Marinella, Rome, Italy
- Venerated in: Catholic Church
- Beatified: 13 November 2005, Saint Peter's Basilica, Vatican City by Cardinal José Saraiva Martins
- Feast: 4 July

Maria Crocifissa Curcio, CMST (born Rosa Curcio; 30 January 1877 – 4 July 1957) was an Italian Catholic religious sister who established the congregation of the Carmelite Missionary Sisters of Saint Therese of the Child Jesus.

Her sole aim was "to bring souls to God" while attempting to emulate the example of Thérèse of Lisieux. Curcio aimed to help the poor while providing educational resources to those who required it, and she had elected Thérèse as her model in spreading evangelization and the Carmelite charism.

Curcio's beatification was celebrated on 13 November 2005.

== Life ==
Rosa Curcio was born on 30 January 1877 in Ragusa as the seventh of ten children of Salvatore Curcio and Concetta Franzò; she was baptized in the church of San Bartolomeo the day after her birth. She was diabetic and suffered from a range of health issues related to that. Her First Communion was held in 1885.

Curcio was noted for her intelligence and her outgoing nature and had a brief education in school of just six years. Despite this, she educated herself through reading the vast range of books in her family library. Out of all works she read she was deeply drawn to the life of Thérèse of Lisieux, and this helped her to discern her religious calling.

In 1890 – despite parental objection – she joined the Carmelite tertiaries in Ispica. She and several others moved in together to see if they all were prepared for such a life. She was transferred to Modica and she used her time to help the poor and orphaned girls. She made her profession as "Maria" in 1895. She was elected as the prioress of the Chapter in 1897 and retained that post until 1908. Though happy with her Carmelite life, she soon felt called to live as a religious rather than as a lay Carmelite. She briefly lived with Dominican nuns but knew her place was not with them. She dwelled with them while under the spiritual guidance of the Bishop of Noto Giovanni Blandini. It was the latter's successor, Giovanni Vizzini, who encouraged her to pursue a Dominican vocation, to which she gently refused for she felt no great connection to their charism or lifestyle.

In June 1924 she met Father Lorenzo van den Eerenbeemt who served as a Carmelite scholar.

She travelled to Rome on 17 May 1925 with Father Lorenzo to witness the canonization of Thérèse of Lisieux under Pope Pius XI. She soon moved to Santa Marinella on 3 July 1925 in order to work exclusively with the poor and destitute. She gained the permission of Cardinal Antonio Vico to establish a congregation there; it was on 16 July 1926 that her small community was approved. It was there that she founded the Carmelite Missionary Sisters of Saint Therese of the Child Jesus, and the congregation received formal papal approval in 1930. It also received the approval of Cardinal Tommaso Pio Boggiani. That same year, Curcio made her perpetual vows. The goal of the new congregation was "to bring souls to God" through initiatives such as supporting families, feeding the poor, and the education of children. She sent some of the sisters to Brazil in December 1947 to spread their spirituality, while telling them to "never forget the poor".

She died on 4 July 1957. She is buried in the Mother House from 16 June 1991 to the present in Rome. In the present time her missionaries spread to other nations such as Canada and Tanzania.

== Beatification ==
The beatification process commenced in Porto-Santa Rufina under Pope John Paul II on 3 January 1989; the commencement of the local process granted Curcio the posthumous title Servant of God. The process spanned from 12 February 1989 until 10 August 1991; it was ratified on 20 December 1991 in order for the cause to proceed to the next stage.

The Positio – documentation on her life and virtues – was submitted to the Congregation for the Causes of Saints in Rome for further evaluation in 1994. Pope John Paul II recognized her life of heroic virtue on 20 December 2002 and proclaimed her to be Venerable.

The miracle attributed to her intercession was subjected to a full diocesan tribunal in a process that spanned from 20 May 1991 until 10 August 1992; the process received the formal decree of ratification on 18 February 1994. John Paul II approved the miracle on 20 December 2004, and the beatification was celebrated on 13 November 2005.
