= Roberto Curcio =

Italian modern pentathlete (1912–1992)

Personal information
- Born: 3 August 1912 Alexandria, Egypt
- Died: 8 April 1992 (aged 79)

Sport
- Sport: Modern pentathlon

Roberto Curcio (3 August 1912 – 8 April 1992) was an Italian modern pentathlete. He competed at the 1948 Summer Olympics.
