= Operation Xcellerator =

DEA operation targeting the Sinaloa Cartel

- Operation name: Operation Xcellerator
- Type: Drug Enforcement Operation

Roster
- Executed by: Drug Enforcement Administration
- Countries participating: Canada, Mexico, United States
- No. of countries participating: 3

Mission
- Target: Organized crime

Timeline
- Date end: February 2009
- Duration: 21 months
- Date executed: February 2009

Results
- Suspects: 755+
- Arrests: 755
- Miscellaneous results: Seizures of: $59.1 Million in Cash, 12,000kg of Cocaine, 8kg Heroin, 1.3 million ecstasy pills, 149 vehicles, 3 aircraft, 3 maritime vessels, 169 weapons

Operation Xcellerator was an operation conducted by the U.S. Drug Enforcement Administration, with cooperation from Mexican and Canadian authorities, against Sinaloa Cartel drug traffickers. In February 2009, after a 21-month operation, it totalled 755 suspects arrested across California, Minnesota, and Maryland.

In addition to the arrests of alleged drug traffickers, US$59.1 million in cash, over 12,000 kg (26,000 lb) of cocaine, 16,000 lb (7,300 kg) of marijuana, 1,200 lb (540 kg) of methamphetamine, 8 kg (18 lb) of heroin, 1.3 million ecstasy pills, 149 vehicles, 3 aircraft, 3 maritime vessels and 169 weapons were seized.

A large-scale meth laboratory was also uncovered, as was an ecstasy lab capable of producing 12,000 pills per hour.
