= 1989 in organized crime =

In 1989, a number of events took place in organized crime.

== Events ==
- As of 1989, only 60 of the 360 convicted defendants from the 1986 Maxi Trial in Sicily remain imprisoned.
- January –
- January 14 – Belgian politician Paul Vanden Boeynants is kidnapped by members of the Haemers criminal gang. Three days later, the criminals publish a note in the leading Brussels newspaper Le Soir, demanding 30 million Belgian francs in ransom. Vanden Boeynants is released unharmed a month later, on 13 February, when an undisclosed ransom is paid to the perpetrators. The gang members were caught and imprisoned. Patrick Haemers, the head of the gang, later committed suicide in prison, and two members of his gang managed to escape from the St Gillis Prison in 1993.
- February – U.S. Attorney General Richard Thornburgh, recently appointed by President Ronald Reagan, officially merges the regional organized crime strike forces the office of the U.S. Attorney General.
- May 2 – Gerald Scarpelli, a former Chicago hitman turned FBI informant, commits suicide while held in the Chicago Metropolitan Correctional Center.
- May 2 – Russian mobster Michael Markowitz who operated a gasoline bootlegging business under the auspices of Colombo Family caporegime Michael Franzese was shot to death while driving his Rolls-Royce in Brooklyn. After being convicted of taking part in the illegal business Markowitz became a government witness against Franzese and testified as to the roles of the Genovese and Lucchese Families in the lucrative business.
- June 6 – Anonymous letters signed by “il corvo” (literally “crow”, but meaning “provocateur”) begin to circulate accusing Giovanni Falcone and police inspector Gianni De Gennaro of sending Contorno to Sicily to start a state sponsored vendetta against the Corleonesi.
- June 17 – The body of William P. Grasso, former underboss to the Patriarca crime family, is found after being dumped in the Connecticut River.
- June 20 – A powerful bomb is discovered outside the summerhouse of Antimafia judge Giovanni Falcone in Addaura as Falcone confers with Swiss magistraters Carla Del Ponte and Claudio Lehman about money laundering by Cosa Nostra in Switzerland.
- August 9 – Richard Costello, President of the International Longshoresman's Union Association Local 1964 and longtime associate of Gambino crime family leaders Thomas Gambino and Paul Castellano, is killed.
- October 8 – Francesco Marino Mannoia starts to collaborate with Antimafia judge Giovanni Falcone.
- October 31, Halloween – Nicodemo Scarfo, Jr. is attacked and almost killed at Dante and Luigi's
- December 4 - Angelo "Quack Quack" Ruggiero, Gambino crime family captain and heroin dealer, dies of cancer. His boss and former best friend John Gotti doesn't visit him before he dies, reportedly still harbouring ill feelings towards Ruggiero for the trouble he caused when his house was bugged.

, an Italian restaurant in Philadelphia.

== Arts and literature ==
- A Better Tomorrow III (film)
- Billy Bathgate (novel)
- The Killer (film) starring Chow Yun-fat, Danny Lee and Sally Yeh.
- Mob War (film) starring Jake LaMotta.

== Deaths ==
- Anthony Loria Sr., Luchesse crime family member, participant in the French Connection drug smuggling case
- May 2 – Gerald Scarpelli, Chicago Outfit member and FBI informant
- August 9 – Richard Costello, President of the International Longshoresman's Union Association Local 1964
- November 13 – Thomas Ocera, Colombo family capo
- November 17 – Costabile Farace "Gus", Bonanno crime family associate
- December 4 - Angelo Ruggiero "Fat Ange", Gambino crime family capo and New York labor racketeer
