= Carmine Sciandra =

Accused American mobster

Carmine Sciandra (born July 5, 1952) is accused of being a gangster who serves as a caporegime in the Gambino crime family and is a co-owner of the Top Tomato grocery chain. In March 2010, Sciandra pleaded guilty to charges of enterprise corruption for running a massive sport-betting and loan sharking ring. He paid $1.2 million in penalties and was sentenced to 1½ to 4½ years in prison. Sciandra served his time at the Hudson Correctional Facility and was released on January 5, 2012.
