= Marco Turco =

Italian director and screenwriter (born 1960)

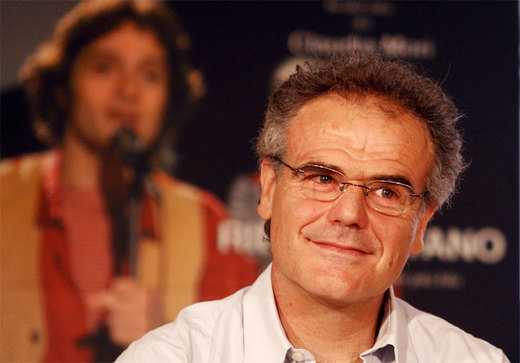
- Turco at the 2007 Roma Fiction Fest
- Born: 28 July 1960 (age 66); Rome, Italy
- Occupations: Director; screenwriter
- Years active: 1992–present

Marco Turco (born 28 July 1960) is an Italian director and screenwriter.

== Life and career ==
Turco holds degrees in History and Philosophy. He studied under Ugo Pirro, Leonardo Benvenuti and Robert McKee at Aldo Giuffrè's drama school. Turco also wrote for L'Unità and Movie magazine.

Turco began his career as an assistant to such directors as Tonino Valerii, Franco Giraldi, Damiano Damiani and Gianni Amelio. He directed several commercials and documentaries. His short films "La sveglia" (1994) and "Coincidenze" (1995) were both featured at the Venice Film Festival. He made his feature film debut in 1998 with Vite in sospeso. The same year he co-wrote the script for the film Tano da morire. In 2005, he released the documentary Excellent Cadavers which chronicles the story of Giovanni Falcone and Paolo Borsellino, Italian magistrates assassinated by the Mafia in 1992. The film received a nomination for a David di Donatello for Best Documentary.

In 2007, he directed the miniseries Rino Gaetano - Ma il cielo è sempre più blu for Rai Uno. Turco released his film La straniera in 2009. Financed by Italy's Ministry of Cultural Heritage and Activities, La straniera was screened at the Turin Film Festival and the Bari Film Festival. In 2010, Turco returned to television with the miniseries C'era una volta la città dei matti..., a fictionalized biography of Italian psychiatrist Franco Basaglia.

== Awards ==
- Telepiù Award for "La sveglia" at the 1994 Venice Film Festival
- Best Italian Short Film for "Coincidenze" at the 1996 Capalbio Cinema International Short Film Festival

== Filmography ==
- 1994 – "La sveglia"
- 1995 – "Coincidenze"
- 1997 – "Jazzitudine"
- 1998 – Vite in sospeso
- 1999 – Il lato sinistro dell'amore
- 1999 – A famiglia
- 2001 – Ritratti italiani n. 7: Gillo Pontecorvo
- 2005 – Excellent Cadavers
- 2008 – Rino Gaetano - Ma il cielo è sempre più blu (TV)
- 2009 – La straniera (film)
- 2010 – C'era una volta la città dei matti... (TV)
