= Richard Costello =

American police officer (1951–2021)

Rich Costello
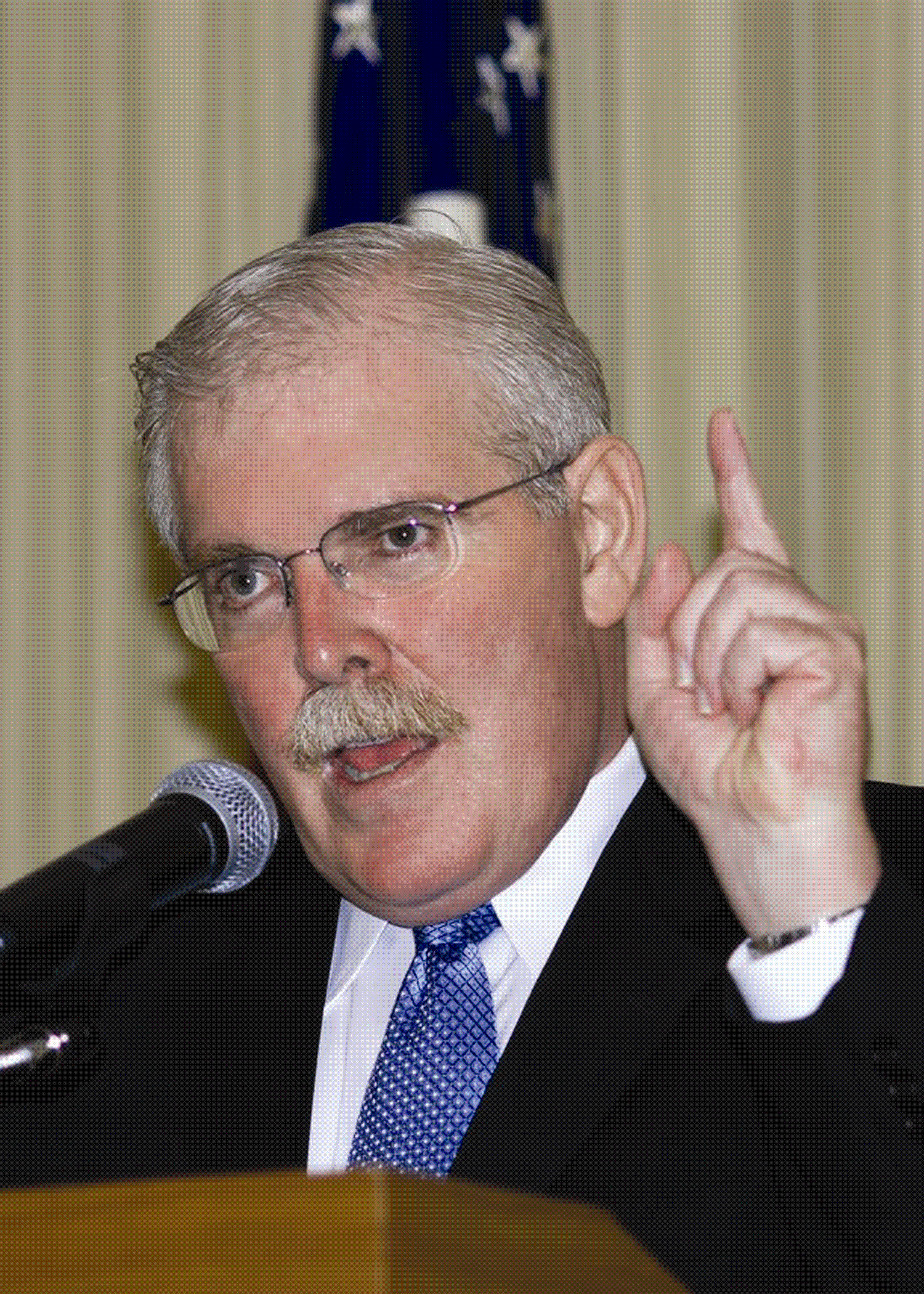

President – Philadelphia Fraternal Order of Police, Lodge 5
- In office October 1988 – October 2002
- Preceded by: Bob Hurst
- Succeeded by: Robert Eddis
- Constituency: Philadelphia Police Officers

Personal details
- Born: April 4, 1951 Philadelphia, Pennsylvania, U.S.
- Died: December 2, 2021 (aged 70) Philadelphia, Pennsylvania, U.S.
- Children: 6
- Occupation: Police officer
- Website: www.RichCostello.com

Captain Richard Barry Costello (April 4, 1951 – December 2, 2021) was an American police officer in Philadelphia who was President of the Philadelphia Lodge of the FOP. In 2008, he unsuccessfully challenged incumbent John Perzel in Pennsylvania's 172nd Legislative District in Northeast Philadelphia.

== Early years ==
Rich Costello was born in Northeast Philadelphia to an Irish-Catholic family. He attended Holy Ghost Preparatory School, followed by St. Joseph's University. Costello earned his bachelor's degree in political science, graduating cum laude in May 1973.

== Police service ==
Following graduation, Costello joined the Philadelphia Police Academy and graduated in September 1973.

=== Shot in the line of duty ===
On the night of December 11, 1973, Costello dropped his partner off at 7:30 PM to guard the Faith Baptist Church in the Strawberry Mansion section of Philadelphia. Fifteen minutes later, Costello was driving his patrol car east on Cumberland St past the intersection of 32nd St when, without warning, a gunman opened fire from the sidewalk. Costello was struck twice in the head with one bullet remaining permanently lodged behind his right ear.

Costello survived and spent two years recovering from his wounds, but was able to successfully rejoin the force.

Both the diligent police response and public outcry kept Costello's case in the headlines. Despite a $10,000 reward from the FOP and a $5,000 reward from the Philadelphia Daily News no one came forward with information, and the case remains unsolved.

=== Rise in the FOP ===
In 1978, Costello joined the FOP as Unit Director after perceiving wrongdoing in the Union's health care benefits sector. After rising to Assistant Administrator of First Dental & Prescription Plan in 1982, Costello uncovered the Kravitz Corruption Scandal.

Dr. Charles Kravitz was the director of American Health Programs (AHP) which was given contracts by the FOP. Kravitz had been bribing top FOP officials to continue contracting out business to his company. After the scandal was uncovered, Kravitz was charged and sentenced to Federal prison.

Having established himself as a credible reformer, Costello was made Recording Secretary in 1984 – a position he held until 1988. In October 1988, Bob Hurst stepped down as President and Costello was elected to his first term as FOP president which lasted until 1990. After this, he served as Chairman of Law Enforcement Health Benefits until 1994, when he was elected to his second term as FOP president.

In 2002, after 8 more years as president of the FOP Costello decided not to seek re-election, citing his desire to allow a new generation to move up. He was succeeded by Robert Eddis in October 2002.

Richard Costello's loyalty to individual police officers was known, and admired, by members of the Philadelphia Police Department. Through arguing the position of the individual police officer and never compromising the values they stood for, Costello was able to serve the City of Philadelphia as President of the Fraternal Order of Police.

=== Abu-Jamal criticism ===
During his tenure as FOP President, Costello was an outspoken critic of Mumia Abu-Jamal and his supporters. Abu-Jamal was convicted of the 1981 murder of officer Daniel Faulkner. Costello has been featured on radio programs such as Michael Smerconish's as well as in televised debates. Known for his extemporaneous speech, during one televised debate he made use of a Bible passage to describe Abu-Jamal as "a liar, the father of lies, and a murderer from the beginning."

== Entry into politics ==
=== 2008 primary ===
In January 2008, Costello decided to challenge long-time Philadelphia Republican Boss, and former House Speaker, John M. Perzel. Costello cited Perzel's many corruption scandals and his refusal to address the problems the Northeast faces with drugs and gun crime as his primary motivation for running. Perzel is heavily backed by the NRA and has refused to enact regulations on guns consistent with the City's upsurge in violence.

Costello handily won the Democratic Primary against challenger Tim Kearney. Kearney had previously challenged Perzel in 2004 and 2006.

== Personal life and death ==
Costello died from heart failure on December 2, 2021, at the age of 70.
