= Excellent Cadavers =

1995 non-fiction book by American author Alexander Stille

Excellent Cadavers: The Mafia and the Death of the First Italian Republic
- Author: Alexander Stille
- Language: English
- Subject: Organized crime
- Genre: non-fiction
- Publisher: Vintage
- Publication date: 1995
- Publication place: United States of America
- Media type: Print (Hardcover, Paperback)
- Pages: 480 pp (Paperback edition)
- ISBN: 0-679-76863-7
- OCLC: 35564595
- Preceded by: Benevolence and Betrayal: Five Italian Jewish Families Under Fascism
- Followed by: The Future of the Past

Excellent Cadavers is a 1995 non-fiction book by American author Alexander Stille about the Sicilian Mafia, concentrating on magistrate Giovanni Falcone's fight against the Mafia and his 1992 assassination.

== Book title ==
The name of the book comes from the phrase "excellent cadavers" (cadaveri eccellenti) or "illustrious corpses", used in Italy when referring to high-profile victims of the Mafia such as politicians, judges and police chiefs (as opposed to less public victims claimed by day-to-day Mafia business). A fictional movie bearing the title Cadaveri Eccellenti (Illustrious Corpses in English) was made in Italy in 1975, directed by Francesco Rosi and starring Lino Ventura.

== Adaptations and related works ==
Stille's 1995 book Excellent Cadavers was made into a television movie in 1999, starring Chazz Palminteri as Giovanni Falcone and F. Murray Abraham as informant Tommaso Buscetta.

In 2005, a documentary of the same name was released in the US, directed by Marco Turco. Produced in Italy, where the work is known as In un altro paese, the documentary is based on, and to some extent updates, Stille's book. Stille, one of the script writers, serves as narrator and tour guide on the scenes of crimes and explains their causes and consequences. Letizia Battaglia, a photojournalist and anti-Mafia activist, plays the role of survivor and passionate eyewitness.
