= 2004 in organized crime =

2004 was a bad year for organized crime, with a number of mob bosses being killed, incarcerated, seriously ill, or dying from various causes. The public perception in popular culture also continued to shift against organized crime.

== Events ==
- 2004 reports show incarcerated Sicilian mafia boss Salvatore Riina had two heart attacks in May and December of 2003.
- January 20 – Montreal cosa nostra boss Vito Rizzuto is arrested in relation to the murder of 3 Bonanno crime family captains.
- April 21 – Hostilities developed between Pietro Scarcella and rival mob figure Michele Modica led to an attempted assassination of Modica in a North York California Sandwiches shop, leaving an innocent victim, mother of three children, Louise Russo paralyzed, while Modica and his associates escaped unscathed.
- June 12 – Lucchese crime family bookmaker Louis Barone pleaded guilty to manslaughter and assault. Barone had asked another Lucchese associate, Albert Circelli, to keep his mouth shut regarding the singing performance inside Rao's in East Harlem and when Circelli was on his way out Barone shot him in the back and killed him, and shot a bystander named Albert W. Petraglia in the leg.
- June 30 – Lucchese crime family acting boss Louis "Louie Bagels" Daidone was sentenced to life in prison after being convicted of loan-sharking and racketeering charges that accused him of conspiracy in the murders of two men, Thomas Gilmore and Bruno Facciolo, whose mouth Daidone stuffed a bird in as a message to future turncoats. The trial featured star witnesses such as former acting bosses Alphonse D'Arco and Joseph DeFede, and hitmen Ken Cardona and Frank Gioia Jr..
- September – Bonanno crime family boss Joe Massino begins cooperating with police for reduced prison time. He begins recording conversations with him and underboss Vincent Basciano.
- September 15 – Gambino crime family gangsters Edward Garafola, his son Mario, John "Johnny Rhino" Vitiello, Richard Calabro, Junior Campbell, a business agent with Laborers Union Local 79, and developer Frederick Contini were indicted for labor racketeering, extortion and fraud in connection with a scheme that ripped the MTA off of over $10 million.
- October 26 – Twenty-two members and associates of the Rudaj Organization are indicted on federal charges of committing numerous crimes in New York City and in Westchester County.
- December 31 – Giuseppe Riina, son of Sicilian mafia boss Salvatore Riina, is sentenced to fourteen years imprisonment for extortion, Mafia association and money laundering.

== Art and literature ==
- Collateral (film) starring Tom Cruise, Jamie Foxx, Jada Pinkett Smith and Mark Ruffalo.
- The Godfather Returns (novel) by Mark Winegardner
- Growing Up Gotti (TV-series)
- Layer Cake (film)
- The Way of the Wiseguy (non-fiction book) by Joseph D. Pistone
- Katekyo Hitman Reborn! (REBORN!) (manga) by Akira Amano

== Deaths ==
- August 17 – Frank Cotroni dies of cancer
