= Velentzas Organization =

Greek-American criminal organization

- Founded by: Peter "Pete the Greek" Kourakos
- Named after: Spyredon "Spiro the Greek" Velentzas
- Founding location: New York City
- Years active: 1950s– mid 2000s
- Territory: Astoria, Queens and New York City
- Ethnicity: Greeks as "made members", other ethnicities, mainly Italians and Albanians as associates
- Membership (est.): 30 (1992)
- Leaders: Spyredon Velentzas, Peter Kourakos, Fotios Dimopoulos
- Criminal activities: Racketeering, loansharking, extortion, and gambling
- Allies: Lucchese crime family, Philadelphia Greek Mob
- Rivals: Rudaj Organization, Gambino crime family

The Velentzas Organization, also known as the Velentzas crime family, or the Greek crew was a Greek-American criminal organization operating in the New York City area. During the 1980s and into the early 1990s, the Greek organization controlled a number of illegal gambling operations in and around the New York City area. After the organization's leader, Spyredon "Spiro the Greek" Velentzas was convicted of murder and sentenced to life in prison in 1992, the organization gradually declined in power.

== Spiro the Greek ==
The group originated from the Kourakos clan, a Greek criminal organization led by Maniot Greek Peter Kourakos.

In the 1980s, under the leadership of Spyredon "Spiro" Velentzas (also known as Spyridon), the organization rose to prominence controlling a number of illegal gambling operations in the New York City area. The organization operated from the Greek-American neighborhood of Astoria, Queens. In the late 1980s, the group grew to over 30 members and had gained more territory in Queens and Brooklyn by taking over more illegal gambling rackets, dice games and horse-racing parlors.

Velentzas maintained a close working relationship with Lucchese crime family's Consigliere Christopher "Christie Tick" Furnari. The Lucchese family provided protection to the Greeks, and received a portion of their gambling profits. Velentzas and his Greek crew attempted to expand their illegal gambling rackets further, but were met with resistance by the Gambino crime family. The FBI caught on wiretaps Gambino family boss John Gotti threatening to have Spiro killed for moving into the gambling territory controlled by the Gambino family.

== Velentzas imprisonment ==
On June 20, 1992, Velentzas was found guilty of murder, loan sharking, gambling, and tax fraud charges, while being found not guilty on one murder charge. Velentzas was later found guilty, for the murder of Sarecho "Sammy the Arab" Nalo and was sentenced to life in prison. Former Lucchese family capo Peter "Fat Pete" Chiodo, who became a government informant, admitted that he gave the Sarecho Nalo murder contract to Lucchese soldiers Michael "Baldy Mike" Spinelli and Richie "The Piece" Pagliarulo. Nalo was murdered on October 25, 1988, while on the phone with Velentzas disputing gambling territory when Michael Spinelli shot him.

In June 2022, the 86-year old Velentzas, still serving life in prison, filed a motion for a compassionate release due to health conditions. As of September 15, 2023, Velentzas was serving his life sentence at FCC Allenwood.

Two other members of the Velentzas family, Peter Drakoulis and Michael Grillo, were found guilty on several charges. Velentzas' own brother, Dimitrios, was acquitted of his only charge, gambling.

Velentzas died in prison of natural causes on May 4, 2024, at the age of 88.

== Against the Rudaj Organization ==
By the late 1990s, Fotios Dimopoulos began leading the Greek crew and controlled the gambling operations in Astoria, Queens for the Lucchese family.

In June 2001, the Albanian Rudaj Organization began extorting Fotios Dimopoulos and attacked his associate Antonios Balampanis, an Albanian who spoke Greek in order to take control of gambling rackets in Astoria, Queens. The Rudaj organization was based in the Bronx and Westchester and supported by the Gambino family.

On August 3, 2001, Rudaj organization member Ljusa Nuculovic and five others attacked Dimopoulos's associate Antonios Balampanis who was running a gambling club known as Soccer Fever. The members of the Rudaj organization entered the Soccer Fever attacking a Greek associate of the Lucchese family and beating Balampanis with a pistol. The attack from the Rudaj organization was retaliation after a Greek member of the Velentzas family and Lucchese associate named Tony had reportedly broken some of their gambling machines. Following the attacks, the Rudaj Organization took control of the Greek dice game barbout. In 2004, the leaders of the Rudaj Organization including Nuculovic were imprisoned on numerous racketeering charges.
