= 1981 in organized crime =

In 1981, a number of events took place in organized crime.

== Events ==
- January 31 – John Stanfa, a Philadelphia crime family member and former driver of slain boss Angelo Bruno, is convicted in Federal District Court of lying to a grand jury investigating Bruno's murder.

== Arts and literature ==
- American Pop (film)
- Easy Street (non-fiction book) by Susan Berman.
- Gangster Wars (film) starring Michael Nouri, Joe Penny, Jonathan Banks, Robert Davi and Richard S. Castellano.
- Thief (film) starring James Caan.

== Deaths ==
- March 15 – Philip C. Testa "Chicken Man", Philadelphia crime family Boss
- April 23 – Stefano Bontade "The Prince", Palermo mafia Capo-Boss
- May 5 – Philip "Phil Lucky" Giaccone, Bonanno crime family Capo
- May 5 – Alphonse Indelicato "Sonny Red", Bonanno crime family caporegime
- May 5 – Dominick "Big Trin" Trinchera, Bonanno crime family Capo
- May 11 – Salvatore "The Heroin King" Inzerillo, Sicilian mafioso, Passo di Rigano Clan capo
- May 27 – Chelsais Bouras "Steve", Philadelphia mobster and leader of the "Greek Mob"
