= 2011 in organized crime =

In 2011, a number of events took place in organized crime. On January 20, 127 mafia members from various crime families in the northeast of the United States. The Mexican drug war continued to be a focus throughout the year.

== Events ==
=== January ===
- January 6 – A U.S. plan to force gun dealers in states which border Mexico to report cases where individuals bought multiple high-powered rifles in under 5 days, is stalled due to opposition from gun lobbies. Approximately 90% of crime guns seized in Mexico originate in the U.S., and over 30,000 people have died in Mexico due to drug cartel violence since 2006.
- January 20 – Agents of the United States charge 127 alleged mafia members, across all five of the New York crime families: Genovese, Gambino, Lucchese, Colombo and Bonanno, as well as the New Jersey-based DeCavalcante family and the Patriarca family in the northeast of the country.

=== February ===
- February 6 – Reputed Mexican drug cartel leader Sandra Ávila Beltrán is sentenced to a year in jail for weapons possession charges.
- February 24 – United States authorities arrest more than 60 suspected members of Mexican drug cartels following the execution of a US Drug Enforcement Administration agent in Mexico last week.
- February 26 – A Mexican judge authorises 40 days of detention for an alleged member of the Los Zetas drug cartel suspected in the killing of a U.S. Immigration and Customs Enforcement agent.

=== March ===
- March 15 – Former US mafia leader Joey Merlino of the Scarfo crime family is released from prison in Indiana and is sent to a halfway house in Florida.

=== April ===
- April 16 – Mexican authorities announce the arrest of Los Zetas Cartel leader Martin Omar Estrada "El Kilo" Luna.

=== May ===
- May 5 – Italian police seize assets worth around $1.38 billion from the Polverino mafia clan in the Naples region, and arrest 39 alleged clan members, including two who were local elections candidates from Prime Minister Silvio Berlusconi's People of Freedom party.
- May 15 – 29 people are decapitated in a massacre in Caserio La Bomba, Petén, Guatemala, in an atrocity possibly linked to the Los Zetas Cartel.
- May 16 – American mafia boss Vincent Basciano is convicted of murder in New York.
- May 17 – A "state of siege" is declared in northern Guatemala after a massacre is committed by The Los Zetas Drug Cartel.
- May 18 – The President of Guatemala, Alvaro Colom, claims that Hugo Alvaro Gomez Vasquez, who has been arrested in relation to the killing of 27 cattle ranch workers, is a leader of the Los Zetas drug cartel in the country.

=== June ===
- June 6 – The United States Federal Bureau of Investigation announces that it has arrested 13 members of the Mafia in the city of Philadelphia in relation to an illegal gambling operation.
- June 30 – Head of Naples police intervention brigade Vittorio Pisani is investigated in Italy after coming under suspicion of leaking information to the mafia.

=== July ===
- July 1 – Italian police arrest the Mafia boss of Corleone in Sicily.
- July 11 – Twenty-three people allegedly linked to the Mexican Los Zetas Cartel are indicted in the US state of Colorado for allegedly trying to smuggle marijuana in the United States.
- July 12 – 1,400 guns involved in Operation Fast and Furious aimed at tracing the flow of weapons to Mexican drug cartels.
- July 13 –
  - Mexico's federal police capture a man who was allegedly the top hitman for the Knights Templar drug cartel.
  - Twenty-one people are killed in the town of Ciudad Juarez in an ongoing war between the Juárez Cartel and the Sinaloa Cartel.
- July 31 – Mexican Federal Police say suspected cartel leader José Antonio Acosta Hernández, who was arrested on Friday, has confessed to ordering the murder of 1,500 people in the country's northern state of Chihuahua.

=== August ===
- August 25 – More than 50 people are killed in an attack on a casino in Monterrey, Nuevo León, Mexico.

=== September ===
- September 20 – Mexican gunmen dump 35 bodies in the city of Boca del Rio, with at least some of the victims having links to organized crime.

== Arts and literature ==
- January – Kill the Irishman (2011)

== See also ==
- Timeline of the Mexican drug war
- Timeline of organized crime

== Bibliography ==
=== References ===
- Kelly, Robert J.; Schatzberg, Rufus; Chin, Ko-lin (1994). Handbook of organized crime in the United States (1994 ed.). Greenwood Publishing Group. ISBN 0-313-28366-4.
- Vilalta, C. (2011). "Monthly patterns, trends, and trajectories in the count of deaths related to organized crime, 2006-2010" (PDF). Conference at UAEM (in Spanish), April 26, 2011. Archived from the original (PDF) on 17 August 2011.
