= Gus Curcio =

Italian-American businessman

Gus Curcio Sr.
- Born: Gustave Vincent Curcio; January 30, 1951 (age 75); Bridgeport, Connecticut, U.S.
- Known for: Businessman

Gustave Vincent "Gus" Curcio Sr. (born January 30, 1951) is an American businessman, former mobster, and retired reputed member of the Genovese crime family. He is the owner or president of several local businesses.

== Early life and family ==
Gustave Vincent Curcio was born in Bridgeport, Connecticut on January 30, 1951. He legally changed his name to Gus Curcio in 1980. He is the youngest of three children born to Gustave Curcio, a/k/a "Red Buff", an Italian immigrant, and Enrica Rita Lucifora, a Sicilian immigrant whose father started the first privately owned bank in Bridgeport. His oldest brother Vincent Louis Curcio was a successful bail bondsman; Francis Gustave Curcio a/k/a "Fat Franny" was the second eldest son who was often referred to as the mayor of Bridgeport due to his power and influence. Gus Curcio Sr has two children, a son, Gus Curcio Jr. who is a prominent businessman, and a daughter Frances who is presently attending Sacred Heart University to become a psychotherapist.

== Criminal conviction ==
Curcio is a retired reputed soldier in the Genovese crime family, as is his brother Francis "Fat Frannie" Curcio. He was convicted on narcotics charges in the early 1970s.

Gus Curcio and his brother Francis were convicted December 14, 1983 by a federal jury in Hartford, Connecticut of being in the loan shark business. To wit: "The defendants were convicted on December 14, 1983, by a jury, having been charged in a seven-count indictment with criminal conspiracy to make extortionate extensions of credit, together with several additional substantive counts of making specific loans constituting criminal acts of extortionate extensions of credit, in violation of 18 U.S.C. §§ 892 and 2. Francis Curcio was found guilty on Counts 1, 2, 3, and 6 of the indictment and Gus Curcio was found guilty on Counts 1, 2, and 6. Count 7 was dismissed by the Court at the close of the government's case for insufficient evidence, and a not guilty finding was made by the jury on Counts 4 and 5."

The Court noted "The history of this case is long and filled with delays and frustrations, some circumstantial and others obviously planned and deliberate, made with the purposeful intention of obstructing the administration of justice." During the trial, Gus Curcio faked a heart attack. Francis Curcio, then weighing 470 pounds, then staged a car collision to fake a back injury in an attempt to delay trial. During the trial, one of nine wiretaps by federal officials investigating other alleged crimes by the Curcios revealed that they planned to disrupt the current criminal trial with medication that would make them vomit or have a fake heart attack in the courtroom.

Francis Curcio received a ten-year sentence, and Gus Curcio received a ten-year sentence.

== Businesses ==
Gus Curcio Sr. owns dozens of business in Connecticut and other states, and he often places his associates like Joseph Regensburger, Dahill D'Onofrio, and his wife Julia Kish as officers, directors or members of the corporations or limited liability companies. Mr. Curcio is a sophisticated consumer of legal services, and has utilized the state and federal courts, like bankruptcy, to further his business interests. He has even sued his own son, Gus Curcio Jr. The Connecticut Appellate Court held in that case that "The documentary evidence and the testimony of the witnesses, however, when reviewed in their entirety, demonstrate that the parties were engaged in intrafamilial business dealings which involved loosely documented, or completely undocumented, corporate transactions, including real estate transfers, for reasons such as the protection of assets from potential creditors."

=== ATM's Unlimited, Inc. ===
Curcio owns and operates a series of automated teller machine companies, including ATM's Unlimited, Inc. In August 2020, when an unnamed third party told Citizens Bank, N.A., a division of Citizens Financial Group to shut down about 60 accounts belonging to Curcio and 45 or so of his associates and entities, Curcio sued in Connecticut Superior Court to find out why.

=== Hawley Enterprises Inc. ===
On June 2, 1982, Curcio and his business partner smashed video games at the Blue Ribbon Cafe in Bridgeport, Connecticut, because it was placed in the cafe by a rival of their business, Hawley Enterprises. The owners of Hawley Enterprises were reportedly Gus Curcio, James Hawley, and Dahill D'Onofrio, who attempted to take the blame for damaging the property.

=== Angelo's Restaurant ===
Curcio was the owner of Angelo's Restaurant. located at 920 Madison Ave. in Bridgeport. In 2011, his wife Kish, and Joseph Regensburger filed an application requesting partial or full nude dancing within the restaurant.

=== Club Allure ===
Curcio placed Club Allure, a strip club in Bridgeport, Connecticut at 2068 East Main Street under Kish's name. Kish also served as president of "Millionair Club Inc."

=== Jack Dempsey's ===
Curcio is the owner of Jack Dempsey's (named after boxer Jack Dempsey), a bar located at 520 Success Ave in Bridgeport, Connecticut. In 2011, Julia Kish, submitted an application requesting partial or fully nude dancing within the bar. Mr. Curcio testified as the manager of Jack Dempsey's during the Rule 341 hearing in Jack Dempsey's bankruptcy. Jack Dempsey's then sued Gus Curcio Sr. and other Curcio associates to eliminate a series of $5,000 mortgages on Jack Dempsey's property.

=== Keepers Gentlemen's Club ===
In April 2000, Curcio provided "limited" support in establishing the only strip club in Milford, Connecticut at that time. Keepers, Inc. and its then-president, Joseph Regensburger, were sued by six former exotic dancers in 2015 for misclassification of them as independent contractors when in reality they were employees. The Fair Labor Standards Act allows for the decision maker of a company to be personally liable for wage and hour violations.

In 2020, an arbitrator awarded the dancers a $201,541 judgment. After a Connecticut Superior Court confirmed this arbitration award October 2, 2020, Keepers and Regensburger appealed, but lost this appeal on October 28, 2022. The Superior Court awarded 10 percent post-judgment interest shortly after. The Connecticut Supreme Court denied Keepers petition for writ of certiorari January 17, 2023, meaning that the arbitration award is a full and final judgment.

Keepers and Regensburger have long been represented by Pellegrino Law Firm's Attorney Stephen Bellis, who is married to Connecticut Superior Court Judge Barbara Bellis.

After an unnamed third party forced Citizens Bank, NA to close 65 bank accounts, Mr. Curcio admitted in court filings seeking to open the accounts that he runs Keepers, Inc. as part of a 65 business conglomerate with interlocking management and ownership.

Curcio controls the Connecticut Entertainment Business Association through his front man Regensburger. Connecticut Entertainment Business Association paid the prominent Connecticut non-profit lobbying firm Gallo & Robinson $15,496.28 for the years 2015–2016; $15,085.17 for the years 2018-2018; $15,920.75 for the years 2019-2020 and $5,611 for the years 2021–2022. Connecticut Entertainment Business Association's mission is "to educate its members and promote the interests of the adult entertainment industry in Connecticut by promoting seminars for members, lobbying efforts with regard to proposed legislative changes and funding litigation critical to the future of the industry."

Regensburger has fronted for Curcio on multiple exotic dance club ventures.

Mr. Regensburger's Chapter 7, Title 11, United States Code bankruptcy petition filed in the United States Bankruptcy Court for the District of Connecticut in October 2020, has been marked by serious questions, including hundreds of thousands of dollars in cash transactions during the one-year clawback period. Regensburger, in one court filing from January 2022, admitted that he cashed a check for $87,000 from one Curcio entity made out to cash and then immediately deposited that money in the account of another Curcio entity. The U.S. Trustee's office in December 2022 filed a petition seeking to deny Mr. Regensburger a discharge in his Ch. 7 petition.

Curcio is a creditor of Regensburger's bankruptcy, and pled the Fifth Amendment to hundreds of questions during an examination in Regensburger's bankruptcy. Curcio signed huge checks to cash Regensburger negotiated.

Kish has been the president of Keepers, Inc. since 2015.

=== Millionair Club Inc. ===
Kish is president of this company as well. In 2010, it was located at 1150 Post Rd. Fairfield, Connecticut. However, it is now headquartered at 33A Light St in Stratford, Connecticut.

=== New England Telecommunications ===
Curcio is the president of New England Communications, located at 520 Success Ave in Bridgeport, Connecticut.

=== Nite Spot Inc. ===
Curcio is the president of Nite Spot Inc. a limited liability corporation.

=== Recycling Inc. ===
On April 20, 2012, Gus Curcio Sr filed a 37-page report claiming to be the owner of Recycling Inc, located on 990 Naugatuck Ave. Milford, Connecticut.

=== Success Inc ===
Curcio is also president of Success Inc, a limited liability corporation.
