= Lorusso e Cutugno Prison =

Prison in Turin, Italy

- Interactive map of Lorusso e Cutugno Prison
- Location: Via Maria Adelaide Aglietta 35, Turin, Piedmont, Italy; 45.10195°N 7.61929°E
- Status: Operational
- Security class: Casa circondariale
- Capacity: 1,119
- Population: 1,575 (30 September 2026)
- Managed by: Ministry of Justice

Lorusso e Cutugno Prison (Italian: Casa circondariale "Lorusso e Cutugno"), commonly known as Le Vallette, is a prison in Turin, Piedmont, Italy. It is in the Vallette district. It is one of the largest prisons in Piedmont. On 30 September 2026 it held 1,575 prisoners, including 135 women, against a regulatory capacity of 1,119.

The prison is named after two prison officers, Giuseppe Lorusso and Lorenzo Cutugno, who were killed by terrorists in Turin on 19 January 1979 and 11 April 1978 while going to work at the city's former prison, Le Nuove. It has carried their names since 2003; a plaque was unveiled at the entrance on 27 September 2019.

== History ==
On 3 June 1989 eleven women, nine prisoners and two prison officers, died in a fire in the women's section.

In November 2021 the prison's psychiatric observation unit, known as Sestante, was closed after the association Antigone reported on the conditions of the people held there; the Turin prosecutor's office opened an investigation into alleged mistreatment.

On 6 February 2026 a first-instance trial in Turin over violence against prisoners ended with eight prison officers convicted, seven of them for torture and one for disclosure of official secrets. The episodes took place between 2017 and 2019 in pavilion C.

== Population and conditions ==
The annual report of the Turin prisoners' ombudsman, cited in September 2024, gave an average presence of about 1,200 people against 990 places. In 2023 there were four suicides and 57 suicide attempts in the prison. More recently, the September 2026 report stated it held 1,575 prisoners against a capacity of 1,119.

The prison has a women's section, which held 115 women in May 2025, and one of Italy's main ICAM units (istituto a custodia attenuata per detenute madri), where mothers are held with their young children.

== Education ==
The prison has a university unit, opened in 1998, the first of its kind in Italy. In 2025 seventeen prisoners lived in the unit and another 47 were enrolled at university while living in other sections.

== See also ==
- Murder of Lorenzo Cutugno
