= 1984 in organized crime =

This article is about events in organized crime in 1984.

== Events ==
- Shinobu Tsukasa, Kiyoshi Takayama, among others formed the Kodo-kai, a yakuza organization which later grew to be one of the largest affiliates of the Yamaguchi-gumi.
- February 4 – Gambino associate and former DeMeo Crew member Richard DiNome is shot to death in his living room by an automatic weapon. Two other individuals with no known organized crime ties who happened to be at his residence at the time were also murdered. Authorities suspect members of the DeMeo Crew murdered DiNome to prevent him from becoming a cooperating witness for the government, but no evidence links them to the crime and the case remains unsolved.
- February 7 – The entire hierarchy and top members of the Kansas City crime syndicate are indicted under the Racketeer Influenced and Corrupt Organizations Act (RICO) by a federal grand jury in Kansas City, Missouri. Charges against the crime family include conspiracy to murder Carl Spero in 1978 as well as skimming operations from the Argent Corporation, the Tropicana casino, and various Kansas City bingo halls. After seven months, boss Carl and his son capo Anthony "Tony Ripe" Civella plead guilty on September 7 receiving 10–30 years and 5 years imprisonment and fined, respectively.
- March 30 – Paul "Big Pauly" Castellano and 23 other individuals are indicted by the Southern District of New York in relation to crimes committed by members of and associates to a crew headed by Gambino soldier Roy DeMeo. The 78-count indictment accused the individuals of a variety of racketeering acts including extortion, loansharking and over 25 murders.
- April – Cesare Bonventre, then the youngest capo in the Bonanno crime family is murdered. Bonanno underboss and future successor to Phil Rastelli, Joe "Big Joey" Massino feared Bonventre's growing power and wealth and felt Bonventre might make a move to seize control of the family since Massino was on the lam from an indictment at the time. Named in an indictment issued on April 9 charging Bonventre and others with involvement in the Pizza Connection case, Bonventre fails to appear, and is assumed to be hiding out to avoid arrest. However, FBI agents discover human remains stuffed into three 60-gallon drums in an office building in Garfield, New Jersey on April 17. By sometime in early May, the remains are positively identified via fingerprints as Beonventre's. He apparently had about $1600 cash on him at the time of his murder, which was left untouched.
- April 9 – Milwaukee racketeer Frank "Frankie Bal" Balistrieri, with his sons John and Joseph Balistrieri, are convicted of extortion under the Hobbs Act based on the testimony of an FBI undercover agent by Balistrieri. Introduced to Balistrieri as a vending-machine representative of the Bonanno Family members, soldier Benjamin "Lefty Guns" Ruggiero and capo Mike "Mimi" Sabella, the agent was the victim of an extortion attempt by Balistrieri after the agent attempted to intrude into the Milwaukee vending-machine business without Balistrieri's prior approval. Balistrieri was later sentenced to 13 years imprisonment on May 29, and his sons received eight-year prison sentences and fined on July 30.
- May 15 – FBI agents observe a Commission meeting held in a Staten Island, New York home. In attendance were Gambino crime family boss Paul Castellano, caporegime Frank DeCicco, soldier Thomas Bilotti, Genovese crime family boss Anthony "Fat Tony" Salerno, Colombo crime family acting boss Gennaro "Gerry Lang" Langella, caporegime Ralph Scopo, and representing the Lucchese crime family was underboss Salvatore Santoro and caporegime Aniello "Neil" Migliore.
- June – The United States and Italy hold the first meeting of the Italian-U.S. Working Group on Drug Interdiction.
- June 22 – Laborers Local 95 officials Joseph Sherman and Stephen McNair were convicted of labor racketeering in connection with an extortion of Chiavone-Chase Corporation. Prosecutors allege the extortion was directed by Genovese boss Vincent "Chin" Gigante.
- July 2 – In a 4–3 ruling, the U.S. Supreme Court declares labor leaders can be required by law to be of good moral character, thereby greatly assisting state officials to take an active role in policing labor union leadership.
- July 11 – Raymond Patriarca, head of the New England's Patriarca crime family, dies of natural causes. Succeeded by his son Raymond Patriarca, Jr., capo Ilario "Larry Baiona" Zannino is promoted to consigliere and receives control of the rackets within the Boston area following the death of Patriarca, Sr. and imprisonment of Gennaro "Jerry" Angiulo as a reward for his support of Patriarca, Jr.
- July 18 – Dominic "Jimmy Regace" Brooklier, head of the Los Angeles crime family, dies of natural causes while serving a five-year sentence on racketeering charges and was succeeded by Peter John Milano.
- September 14 – Salvatore "The Prince" Testa, a capo in the Philadelphia crime family, is killed on the orders of family boss Nicodemo Scarfo.
- September 18 – Lucchese crime family leader Anthony "Tony Ducks" Corallo, along with 21 others and 16 organizations, is indicted for conspiring to monopolize the private garbage collection business on Long Island, New York as well as splitting quarterly payments from companies of an estimated $50,000 between Corallo and Gambino crime family leader Paul Castellano.
- October 18 - In a newspaper article, The Boston Globe reports that the imprisoned Gennaro J. "Jerry" Angiulo, Patriarca crime family underboss (Boston Faction) since the 1968 imprisonment of former underboss Enrico "Henry" Tameleo, is demoted to soldier as the result of a power struggle in the wake of Ramond Patriarca's death in July. Angiulo's brother, Vittore Nicolo "Nick" Angiulo, who had been serving as the family's consigliere, has also been demoted.
- December 5/7 – Gambino crime family soldiers (and reputed members of New Jersey's Cherry Hill Gambino Crew) Rosario Gambino, Erasmus Gambino, Anthony Spatola, and Antonio Gambino are fined $300,000 on drug related charges and sentenced to combined 143 years imprisonment.
- December 23 – Mafia boss Giuseppe "Pippo" Calo organizes the bombing of the 904 express train (Rapido 904) from Naples to Milan killing 17 people and injuring 200 more. The plan was to divert the attention of the police from the Mafia to terrorism.

== Arts and literature ==
- Johnny Dangerously (film) starring Michael Keaton
- Once Upon a Time in America (film) starring Robert De Niro, James Woods, Elizabeth McGovern, Tuesday Weld, William Forsythe, Joe Pesci, Treat Williams, Burt Young and Danny Aiello
- The Sicilian (novel) by Mario Puzo

== Deaths ==
- February 4 – Richard DiNome, former Gambino associate and DeMeo Crew member
- April – Cesare Bonventre, Bonanno crime family capo
- July 7 – Raymond Patriarca, Sr., boss of the Patriarca crime family
- September 14 – Salvatore Testa "Salvie", Philadelphia Family capo
- September 16 – Vincenzo Cotroni dies of cancer
