= 2009 in organized crime =

== Events ==
=== January ===
- January 5 – Giovanni Venosa, star of the film Gomorra, is arrested for attempting to collect pizzo protection money from businesses.
- January 8 – Colombian drug lord Leonidas Vargas is shot dead by assassins while lying in a hospital bed in Madrid.
- January 19–21 police officers in Tijuana are arrested on suspicion of collaborating with drug cartels.
- January 28 – Frank Calabrese, Sr. receives life imprisonment for numerous murders.

=== February ===
- February 2 – An Italian court finds four 'Ndrangheta members guilty of the 2005 murder of Francesco Fortugno.
- February 5–10 drug dealers are killed in a battle with police in Rio de Janeiro.
- February 5 – Mexican police capture drug dealer Geronimo Gamez Garcia in Mexico City.
- February 10 – Troops descent upon a police station in Cancún in connection with the torture and murder of former general Mauro Enrique Tello, who led an elite anti-drugs squad.
- February 11–21 people, including one soldier, are shot dead in a gunfight in Chihuahua, Mexico.
- February 12 – Octavio Almanza, alleged head of Los Zetas in Cancún is arrested.
- February 19 – International organized crime figure Ricardo Fanchini pleads guilty to a conspiracy to distribute ecstasy in the United States.
- February 27 – American raids code-named Operation Xcellerator on the Sinaloa cartel in California, Minnesota and Maryland lead to 755 arrests, the discovery of a 'super meth lab' and laboratory equipment capable of producing 12,000 ecstasy pills an hour.

=== March ===
- March 7 – NYPD and mafia associates Stephen Carapacca and Louis Eppolito are given life sentences for their part in eight murders.
- March 13 – Giovanni Strangio of the Pelle-Votari 'Ndrangheta clan is arrested in Amsterdam.

=== April ===
- Early April – Tadamasa Goto, the founder and former head of the Goto-gumi, became a Buddhist priest.
- April 2 – Mexican drug lord Vicente Carrillo Leyva is arrested.
- April 15 – Colombian police capture drug lord Daniel Rendón Herrera.
- April 19 – In Mexico eight police officers are killed in an attack on a prison convoy transporting senior leaders of the Beltran Leyva cartel.Mexico drug gang's rescue foiled

=== May ===
- May 18 – Raffaele Amato, a Camorra boss accused of being one of the principal importers of cocaine into Italy, is arrested in Marbella, Spain.
- May 21 – Colombian security forces arrest 112 members of the Norte del Valle cartel.
- May 22 – Police find $10m in counterfeit bank notes and weapons in the house of Mafia boss Fabbio Manno.Fake millions found in Mafia raid

=== June ===
- June 21 – Sicilian Mafioso Salvatore Miceli, on the list of most wanted fugitives in Italy, is captured in Venezuela following 3 days of surveillance.

=== November ===
- November 1 – Pasquale Russo (Camorra), wanted since 1995 and on the list of most wanted fugitives in Italy, is arrested in Sperone (Avellino).
- November 7 – Luigi Esposito (Camorra), wanted since 2003 and on the list of most wanted fugitives in Italy, is arrested in Posillipo.
- November 15 – Domenico Raccuglia (Cosa Nostra), wanted since 1996 and on the list of most wanted fugitives in Italy, is arrested in Calatafimi, Sicily.

=== December ===
- December 5 – Giovanni Nicchi (Cosa Nostra), wanted since 2006 and on the list of most wanted fugitives in Italy, is arrested in Palermo. In Milan Gaetano Fidanzati (Cosa Nostra), wanted since 2008, is arrested as well.
- December 31 – The bodies of six men abducted December 30 in the north-central Mexican state of Durango are found shot to death execution-style. Among them are Bobby Salcedo, an assistant principal and school board member, who is from El Monte, California. Salcedo is believed to be the first U.S. elected official killed in the four years of Mexican drug-related violence.

== Arts and literature ==
- Killshot (film)

== Deaths ==
- January 9 – Colombian drug lord Leonidas Vargas
- February – Mexican former general Mauro Enrique Tello, leader of elite anti-narcotics squad
- February 11–21 people, including one soldier, are shot dead in a gunfight in Chihuahua, Mexico
- April 19 – In Mexico eight police officers are killed in an attack on a prison convoy transporting senior leaders of the Beltrán-Leyva Cartel
- May 14 – Salvatore Lombardi "Sally Dogs", Genovese crime family, capo
- May 17 – Alfonso Tornabene "Pizza Al", Chicago Outfit, boss
- May 22 – Isoji Koga, the founder of the Dojin-kai
- July – Anthony Seccafico "Little Anthony", Bonanno crime family, gang member
- November 4 – Antonio Pelle, 'Ndrangheta boss
- December 16 – Marcos Arturo Beltrán-Leyva, Mexican drug lord
- December 28 – Nick Rizzuto Jr., Montreal organized crime figure
- December 31 – Bobby Salcedo, an assistant principal and school board member
