= 2002 in organized crime =

== Events ==
- A rift within the Sicilian Cosa Nostra becomes clear. On the one hand there are the hardline "Corleonesi" in jail – led by Totò Riina and Leoluca Bagarella – and on the other the more moderate "Palermitani" – led by Bernardo Provenzano, Antonino Giuffrè, Salvatore Lo Piccolo and Matteo Messina Denaro.
- March 28 – Pietro Aglieri writes a letter to the National Anti-mafia Prosecutor (DNA), Pierluigi Vigna, and the Chief Prosecutor of Palermo, Pietro Grasso to ask for negotiations. His proposal is that mafiosi would get more lenient penalties (in particular the relaxation of the article 41-bis prison regime) in return for recognizing the existence of Cosa Nostra and the authority of the Italian state. Aglieri had been approached by Vigna in 2000 in an attempt to get mafiosi to "dissociate" from Cosa Nostra — without becoming collaborators of justice — a method that was used successfully in the struggle against the Red Brigades. Ex-Red Brigades members could publicly recognise their errors without having to admit their own criminal responsibilities.
- April 16 – Arrest of Antonino Giuffrè. He started feeding investigators information even before he agreed to turn state' witness (or pentito) in June, 2002. He is one of the most important mafia turncoats since Tommaso Buscetta in 1984. His collaboration has updated investigators' knowledge and provided a new interpretation for the sensitive issue of Cosa Nostra's relations with politics in the early 1990s. Apparently the arrest of Giuffrè was made possible by an anonymous phone call that seems to have been made by loyalists to the Mafia hardliners Totò Riina and Leoluca Bagarella. The purpose was to send a message to Bernardo Provenzano. The incarcerated bosses want something to be done about the harsh prison conditions (in particular the relaxation of the 41-bis incarceration regime) – and were believed to orchestrate a return to violence while serving multiple life sentences.
- April 29 – Genovese crime family soldier Lawrence "Larry Glitz" Galizia, and associates Frank Isoldi, Christopher Demenna, Anthony Hooks and Robert Schwall were indicted for making illegal loans ranging from $15,000 to $100,000 and collecting gambling debts to a gambling service run through an 800 number in Costa Rica.
- May 12 – Former Commission member Joseph Bonanno died at the age of 97. Bonanno had survived a shooting war against rebels in his own family and had survived after his plan to kill fellow commission members Carlo Gambino and Thomas Lucchese was revealed to the commission. Bonanno also lived to write a book about his life.
- June – At a court appearance Leoluca Bagarella makes some thinly veiled threats to the Italian government, saying the Mafia is "tired of being manipulated by political forces."
- June 4 – A massive racketeering indictment was handed down against Gambino crime family boss Peter Gotti, captains Anthony "Sonny" Ciccone and Richard V. Gotti, soldiers Richard G. Gotti, Primo Cassarino, Jerome Brancato, and Peter Piacenti, associates Vincent Nasso, Julius Nasso, Richard Bondi, Salvatore Cannata, Thomas Lisi, Carmine Malara, Anthony Pansini, Jerome Orsino, Jr. The indictment alleged that the Gambino crime family controlled the Brooklyn and Staten Island waterfronts, engaged in shaking down waterfront businesses and trucking companies, cooperated with the Genovese crime family in ripping off the ILA benefit plans, and for a number of years the group extorted screen actor Steven Seagal, and were trying to force him to pay them $150,000 per movie he made. Staten Island Conservative Party boss and head of the Staten Island waterfront terminal was forced to pay Ciccone $2,000 per month for protection. All men would be sentenced to prison.
- June 10 – Former Gambino crime family godfather John Gotti died of throat cancer in a prison hospital. Gotti's successor brother Peter was under indictment facing trial and would miss his brother's funeral services.
- June 20 – Gambino crime family captains Louis Vallario and Michael DiLeonardo, soldiers Frank Fappiano and Edward Garafola were indicted for exerting illegal influence on construction companies, businesses in the Garment District, and wholesale produce distributors in New York City. A later indictment would also charge soldier Thomas "Huck" Carbonaro and associate John Matera with taking part in the murder of Staten Island businessman Fred Weiss. DiLeonardo and Fappiano would become cooperating witnesses, and DiLeonardo would go on to testify against John Gotti, Jr. and Colombo acting boss Alphonse "Allie Boy" Persico.
- September 6 – Former Gambino crime family underboss and number two man under John Gotti, Salvatore Gravano, was sentenced to 20 years in prison for running a multimillion-dollar Ecstasy ring in Arizona. Gravano had admitted to committing 19 murders and his testimony was largely responsible for sending John Gotti and consigliere Frank LoCascio to prison for the rest of their lives.
- December 9 – Gambino crime family captain Ronald "Ronnie One Arm" Trucchio and his 25-year-old soldier son Alphonse were indicted for operating a $30 million-a-year sports betting ring based in Ozone Park, Queens. Prosecutors alleged that the operation was making $600,000 per week.
- December 23 – Bonanno crime family consigliere Anthony Graziano pleaded guilty to his involvement in a murder conspiracy, loansharking and evading over $100,000 in taxes.

== Arts and literature ==
- All About the Benjamins (film)
- City of God (film)
- Dark Blue (film)
- Empire (film)
- Gangs of New York (film)
- Narc (film)
- Road to Perdition (film)
- The Good Thief (film)

== Deaths ==
- George Fresolone, Philadelphia crime family informant
- June 10: John J. Gotti, Gambino Crime Family – Boss
