= 1992 in organized crime =

== Events ==
- John D'Amato, the boss of the New Jersey mafia family is shot and killed by Anthony Capo on the orders of Stefano Vitabile. According to later testimony by Capo, D'Amato was killed because he was homosexual, an offence punishable by death within the Mafia.
- January 22 - Five top New England mobsters, including consigliere Joseph "J.R." Russo and capo Vincent M. Ferrara, plead guilty to racketeering, extortion, gambling and involvement in the 1985 murder of Vincent Limoli.
- December 2 – Lucchese soldier Patrick Testa is shot to death allegedly by Tommy Jones, a hitman and Los Angeles crime family associate, in the garage of a Brooklyn used car lot. The hit was allegedly ordered by Anthony Casso, the underboss of the Family at the time.

== Arts and literature ==
- The American Gangster (documentary)
- American Me (film) starring Edward James Olmos and William Forsythe
- Hard Boiled (film) starring Chow Yun-fat and Tony Leung Chiu Wai
- Hoffa (film) starring Jack Nicholson, and Danny DeVito
- Juice (film) starring Omar Epps, Tupac Shakur and Samuel L. Jackson
- Teamster Boss: The Jackie Presser Story (film) starring Brian Dennehy, Jeff Daniels, María Conchita Alonso, Eli Wallach, Robert Prosky and Al Waxman
- Who Do I Gotta Kill? (film) starring James Lorinz, John Costelloe, Vincent Pastore and Steve Buscemi
- Reservoir Dogs (film)

== Deaths ==
- John D'Amato "Johnny Boy", New Jersey mob boss
- March 12 – Salvatore Lima, Sicilian politician and mafia associate
- May 23 – Giovanni Falcone, Sicilian anti-mafia magistrate killed in the Capaci bombing
- May 23 – Francesca Morvillo-Falcone, Sicilian magistrate and wife of Giovanni Falcone
- May 23 – Rocco Di Cillo, Sicilian police officer
- May 23 – Antonio Montinaro, Sicilian police officer
- May 23 – Vito Schifani, Sicilian police officer
- July 19 – Paolo Borsellino, Sicilian anti-mafia magistrate killed in the Via D'Amelio bombing
- July 19 – Agostino Catalano, Sicilian police officer
- July 19 – Walter Cosina, Sicilian police officer
- July 19 – Emanuela Loi, Sicilian police officer
- July 19 – Vincenzo Li Muli, Sicilian police officer
- July 19 – Claudio Traina, Sicilian police officer
- December 2 – Patrick Testa, Lucchese Family soldier
