= 2007 in organized crime =

== Events ==
=== January ===
- January – Mexico sends troops to combat violence between drugs cartels in Tijuana.

=== February ===
- February 5 – Yakuza boss Ryoichi Sugiura is gunned down in his car in Tokyo.
- February 9 – Cuba deports drugs baron Luis Hernando Gomez to Colombia
- February 11 – 9 people are killed in a shootout between militia forces, drug dealers and police in Rio de Janeiro.
- February 16 – Eugenio Montoya, the leader of the Norte del Valle Cartel is captured by police.

=== March ===
- March 7 – British mobster Terry Adams is sentenced to seven years for money laundering.
- March 7 – An abandoned truck is found in California containing over $20m worth of marijuana.
- March – Italian police arrest over 200 Camorra suspects as part of a crackdown in Naples and southern Italy.
- March 19 – Sniffer dogs in Johor Bahru, Malaysia, lead police to discover up to $3m in DVD and CD pirate copies. Crime bosses respond by putting a price on their heads.

=== April ===
- April 2 – Irish drug lord Brian Brendan Wright is found guilty of running an international cocaine-smuggling operation.
- April 3 – Peruvian President Alan García authorizes the use of military aircraft to destroy drug laboratories in the Amazon jungle.
- April 3 – Mexican police arrest suspected drug lord Victor Magno Escobar in Tijuana
- April 6 – The wearing of hooded Easter penitents is allowed once again in the town of Corleone. It had been banned for the previous 40 years due to its use in mafia assassinations.
- April – Brazilian police arrest 20 suspected members of a gang specializing in contract killings in the state of Pernambuco.
- April 17 – Iccho Itoh, mayor of Nagasaki, is shot twice in a suspected Yakuza attack. He dies soon after.
- April 23 – The United States Coast Guard make a record seizure of over 20 tonnes of cocaine worth $600m.

=== May ===
- May 4 – Vito Rizzuto pleaded guilty to conspiracy to commit murder as well as racketeering charges, admitting that he was present at the triple murder in 1981 of Philip Giaccone, Dominick Trinchera and Alphonse Indelicato, but stated he had only yelled "it's a holdup", while others did the shooting; he received a 10-year prison sentence and was fined $250,000, to be followed by a three-year supervised release as part of the plea bargain.
- May 15 – Top Mexican anti-drug officials Jose Nemesio Lugo and Jorge Altriste are murdered.
- May 16 – Five Mexican policemen are killed and several abducted in the town of Cananea. Drug cartels are believed to responsible for the attack. Eight attackers were reportedly killed by police hours later.
- May 17 – A fugitive from Italy connected with the Camorra is captured in Lancashire, England.
- May 18 – Retired Yakuza Hisato Obayashi gives himself in to police after a two-day standoff during which he shot at both his family and police and held his wife hostage.
- May 29 – A gang of seven men are sentenced to death in Indonesia for setting up and running a large-scale ecstasy factory, capable of producing a million pills a week.

=== June ===
- June 1 – A large car theft ring are sentenced in a British court.
- June 6 – All five defendants in the Roberto Calvi murder trial are acquitted.
- June 6 – Robert DeCicco, an associate of the Gambino crime family, is shot three times in a drive-by shooting but manages to escape alive. DeCicco's father is George DeCicco a longtime Gambino family captain, brother of the family's former underboss Frank DeCicco.
- June 8 – Rudolph Izzi, a soldier in the Genovese crime family, is found shot dead in his Brooklyn home.
- June 14 – British drug lord Curtis Warren is released from a Dutch prison.
- June 19 – Jury selection starts for the trial of Chicago Outfit boss Joey "The Clown" Lombardo
- June 23 – Guatemalan drug baron Otto Roberto Herrera Garcia is captured by police in Colombia.
- June 27 – 19 people die in a fierce gun battle between drugs gangs and police in Alemao, Rio de Janeiro.
- June 29 – An abandoned boat containing 1.2 tons of cocaine is discovered off the coast of Senegal.

=== July ===
- July 20 – Luis Hernando Gomez is extradited to the US.
- July 26 – A BBC investigation reveals a child trafficking ring in Bulgaria.
- July 26 – The FBI shuts down a major international Chinese media piracy ring, believed to have distributed illegal software with a total selling price of over 2 billion dollars.

=== August ===
- August 7 – Brazilian police arrest top Norte del Valle Cartel boss Colombian Juan Carlos Ramírez Abadía in Rio.
- August 10 – Chinese authorities report to have foiled a plot by Snakehead gangsters to smuggle a dozen young men abroad by posing them as martial artists from the Shaolin Temple.
- August 15 – 6 men with connections to the 'Ndrangheta are shot dead in Germany after exiting a pizzeria. The murders are believed to be related to the San Luca feud.
- August 27 – Arrests are made over the murder of Russian journalist Anna Politkovskaya, linking the case to a Chechen organized crime group and former FSB agents.
- August 28 – A girl of three survives a gangland execution where three were killed and two injured in Hertfordshire, England. The deaths were later believed to be over a drugs debt of £600.
- August 30 – Police in Italy arrest more than 30 suspects in the connection with the 'Ndrangheta murders in Germany.

=== September ===
- September 10 – Joey "The Clown" Lombardo and four other defendants are found guilty of various charges ranging from murder to racketeering.
- September 10 – Colombian drug lord Diego Montoya is captured in his home province of Valle del Cauca. He had previously been one of the FBI's Ten Most Wanted Fugitives.
- September 27 – Joseph "The Clown" Lombardo is found guilty of the 1974 Seifert murder.

=== October ===
- October 16 – Italian police confirm that witness to a 'Ndrangheta murder case hanged himself after being disowned by his family.
- October 18 – Hundreds turn up at the funeral of Taiwanese crime boss Chen Chi-li, boss of the United Bamboo Gang.

=== November ===
- November 1 – The mob-related murder cases against former FBI agent Lindley DeVecchio are dropped by prosecutors because of conflicting evidence.
- November 2 – Mexican authorities seize a record 23.5 tons of cocaine at the port of Manzanillo.
- November 5 – Sicilian mafia boss Salvatore Lo Piccolo is captured near the capital of Palermo. Lo Piccolo had been on the run for 20 years.
- November 26 – United Brotherhood of Carpenters President Douglas J. McCarron ordered an emergency, temporary supervision over Manhattan East Side Local 157, citing allegations of bribery, ties to members of the Genovese and Gambino crime families, and no-show business agents; the Local's top three officers resigned, while two Local shop stewards are under federal indictment. The Executive-Treasurer of the N.Y.C. District Council of Carpenters, Michael Forde, maintains his top position while facing a re-trial in Manhattan state court on charges of accepting bribes from non-union contractors and splitting the payments with the former acting boss of the Lucchese crime family. Local 157's President, William Hanley, was removed from his position, and a federal grand jury was empaneled to investigate the charges, including allegations that Hanley prevailed upon a contractor to hire one Joseph Vecchiarello, an organized crime figure with no carpentry skills.

=== December ===
- December 14 – Camorra boss Edoardo Contini is captured in Naples after more than seven years on the run.
- December 18 – New Jersey Attorney General Anne Milgram announced the indictment of 32 members and associates of the Lucchese crime family, including its top captain in New Jersey, Ralph Perna, and two of the family's top New York leaders, Joseph DiNapoli and Matthew Madonna. The indictment alleges that the wiseguys even had an ongoing operation with members of the Bloods gang, whereby they were providing inmates in a New Jersey prison with drugs and other contraband.
- December 19 – Lucchese crime family soldier John Baudanza was sentenced to 7 years in prison and $20,500 in restitution for heading a violent stock pump-and-dump scheme for over 10 years.
- December 19 – Ailing Staten Island and Brooklyn-based Gambino crime family captain George DeCicco pleaded guilty to running a loan sharking operation from 1999 to 2007. DeCicco is the uncle of former family underboss Frank DeCicco and father of associate Robert DeCicco who was nearly killed in an attempted murder outside a Brooklyn social club earlier in the year. DeCicco was the last of the captains either alive on still on the street from the days of John Gotti's reign.
- December 28 – Colombo crime family figure Alphonse Persico is found guilty of the murder of William Cutolo, Sr. He awaits sentencing.
- December 29 – The entire police force in the Mexican town of Playas de Rosarito, Baja California, is disarmed from their weapons after suspicion of collaborating with drug cartels.

== Arts and literature ==
- Alpha Dog (film)
- American Gangster (film)
- No Country For Old Men (film)
- Outlaw (film)
- Smokin' Aces (film)
- We Own the Night (film)

== Deaths ==
- February 5 – Yakuza chief, Ryoichi Sugiura.
- February 11 – 9 people are shot in a gun battle in a Rio de Janeiro slum, including 1 off-duty policeman.
- April 17 – Iccho Itoh, mayor of Nagasaki.
- May 15 – Mexican anti-drug officials Jose Nemesio Lugo and Jorge Altriste.
- May 16 – Five Mexican police officers and eight gang members.
- June 8 – Gambino crime family mobster Rudolph Izzi.
- June 27 – 19 people die in a fierce gun battle between drugs gangs and police in Alemao, Rio de Janeiro.
- July 30 – Scottish crime boss, Thomas McGraw "The Licensee".
- August 6 – Cuban Organized Crime Boss Jose Miguel Battle, Sr.
- August 15 – 6 men connected to the 'Ndrangheta are shot dead in Germany.
- August 28 – Three die in a gangland hit in Hertfordshire, England.
- October – United Bamboo Gang boss Chen Chi-li.
- October 16 – 'Ndrangheta informer Bruno Piccolo is found to have committed suicide.
