= 1995 in organized crime =

== Arts and literature ==
- American Tabloid (novel) by James Ellroy
- Excellent Cadavers (non-fiction book) by Alexander Stille
- Casino (film) starring Robert De Niro, Joe Pesci and Sharon Stone
- Tough Guy: The True Story of "Crazy" Eddie Maloney (autobiography) by Eddie Maloney
- The Usual Suspects (film) starring Stephen Baldwin, Gabriel Byrne, Benicio del Toro, Kevin Pollak, Kevin Spacey, Chazz Palminteri and Pete Postlethwaite
- Heat (film)

== Deaths ==
- Joseph Zingaro, Gambino crime family capo
- Louis Grecco, Patriacra crime family associate
- January 26 – William Cammisano "Willie the Rat", Kansas City mobster
- March 17 – Ronnie Kray, UK crime boss, Kray Firm
- March 20 - Joseph Schiro-Scarpa, New York drug dealer affiliated with the Colombo LCN Family and son of mobster of Gregory "The Grim Reaper" Scarpa, Sr.
- April 1 - Louis Raucci, Pittsburgh mobster involved in drug trafficking
- June 23 - Frank Salemme, Jr., Patriarca crime family soldier and son of crime boss "Cadillac" Frank Salemme
- August 13 - Dominic Musitano, Toronto mobster
- September 1 – Joseph N. Gallo, Gambino crime family consigliere
- September 21 – Albert Tocco, Chicago Outfit member
- November 22 – Frank O'Hehir, Colombo crime family associate
- November 24 – Benjamin "Lefty Guns" Ruggiero, Bonanno crime family member
