= 1993 in organized crime =

== Events ==
- The Rudaj Organization, an Albanian and Italian crime group, is established in Westchester County, New York.
- February 7 – Milwaukee boss Frank P. "Mr. Big" Balistrieri died in his home from a heart attack. Balistrieri had been released from prison 15 months earlier after serving a term for extortion.
- March 2 – New Orleans boss Carlos Marcello died in his sleep in his Metairie home, which he had resided at since his 1989 release from prison.
- May 24 – Seven people, including priest Juan Jesús Posadas Ocampo, are assassinated the parking lot of the Guadalajara International Airport in Mexico. Posadas Ocampo received 14 gunshot wounds whilst in his car. The government inquiry into the murder concluded that Posadas Ocampo was killed accidentally in a battle between rival drug cartels.
- June 25 – Rochester crime family boss Samuel Rusotti died in prison while serving a sentence for committing two murders, three attempted murders and for extorting several gambling clubs. Russotti’s 1984 conviction marked the downfall of the Rochester-based organized crime family. Russotti had been responsible for causing the ABC War, where seven family members were murdered and numerous bomb explosions took place over a two-year period.
- July 27–28 – The Mafia detonates bombs at the Villa Reale Museum and the Pavilion of Contemporary Art in Milan, and the Church of San Giorgio and the Lateran Vicariate in Rome on. In total the attacks (including the one in Florence on May 28) left 10 people dead and 93 injured.
- December 2 – Colombian drug lord Pablo Escobar is shot and killed in Medellín

== Arts and literature ==
- A Bronx Tale (film)
- Carlito's Way (film)
- Menace II Society (film)

== Deaths ==
- February 7 – Frank Balistrieri "Frankie Bal", Milwaukee crime boss
- March 2 – Carlos Marcello, former New Orleans crime boss
- March 13 – Arthur Thompson "The Godfather", Scottish crime boss.
- June 25 – Samuel Rusotti, Rochester crime boss
- October 20 – Joseph Scopo, Colombo crime family caporegime
- November 9 – Joe "Pegleg" Morgan, Mexican Mafia Boss
- November 16 – Luciano Leggio, Cosa Nostra boss.
