= 1991 in organized crime =

== Events ==
- April 13 – Gambino crime family soldier Bartholomew "Bobby" Boriello was gunned down outside his Bensonhurst, Brooklyn home.
- August 9 – Antonio Scopelliti, the prosecutor scheduled to argue the government’s case in the final appeal of the Maxi Trial before the Italian Supreme Court, is assassinated while on vacation in Calabria.
- August 29 – Libero Grassi, a Palermo businessman who publicly defied the Mafia’s extortion racket is murdered in Palermo.

== Arts and literature ==
- Billy Bathgate (film) starring Dustin Hoffman, Loren Dean, Bruce Willis, Steven Hill, Steve Buscemi and Stanley Tucci.
- Boyz n the Hood (film) starring Laurence Fishburne, Cuba Gooding Jr. and Ice Cube.
- Mobsters (film) starring Christian Slater, Patrick Dempsey, Richard Grieco, Costas Mandylor, F. Murray Abraham, Chris Penn and Anthony Quinn.
- Oscar (film) starring Peter Riegert, Chazz Palminteri, Joey Travolta and Sylvester Stallone
- New Jack City (film)

== Deaths ==
- June 24 – Philip Rastelli "Rusty", Bonanno crime family boss
