= 1985 in organized crime =

In 1985, a number of events took place in organized crime.

== Events ==
- Frank "Flowers" D'Alfonso, an influential associate of the former Bruno crime family boss Angelo Bruno, is murdered by seven members, including soldier Eugene "Whip" Milano, belonging to Nicodemo "Little Nicky" Scarfo's organization for refusing to pay a street tax to Scarfo.
- Massachusetts mobster Vincent Limoli is murdered on the orders of captain Vincent "The Animal" Ferrara.
- February 25 – The leadership of New York's Five Families – The Commission, leaders Anthony "Fat Tony" Salerno (Genovese crime family) boss, Philip "Rusty" Rastelli (Bonanno crime family) boss, Colombo crime family boss Carmine "Junior" Persico, Colombo acting boss Gennaro "Jerry Lang" Langella, Paul "Big Pauly" Castellano (Gambino crime family) boss, Gambino underboss Aniello "The Lamb" Dellacroce, Anthony "Tony Ducks" Corallo (Lucchese crime family) boss, Lucchese underboss Salvatore "Tom Mix" Santoro, Lucchese consiglieri Christopher "Christy Tic" Furnari, Bonanno crime family soldier Anthony "Bruno" Indelicato and Colombo crime family soldier and "concrete club" overseer Ralph Scopo are indicted under the Racketeer Influenced and Corrupt Organizations Act (RICO) by a federal grand jury for operating a criminal enterprise. Included in the indictment are violations under the Hobbs Act including extortion, labor racketeering and murder for hire, in the famous "Commission Case".
- March 30 – The Sicilian Mafia boss Giuseppe "Pippo" Calo of the Porta Nuova family is arrested for money laundering, mafia association and organizing the bombing of a train in 1984.
- May 11 – The leaders of the alleged New York's Five Families are charged by the Federal Bureau of Investigation as the result of a major prosecution into organized crime.
- June 25 – Colombo crime family leader Carmine "Junior" Persico is charged with extortion and murder.
- September – The Sicilian Mafia boss Pino Greco of the Ciaculli family is killed on the orders of Salvatore "Toto" Riina. Greco had become a very influential member of Cosa Nostra after the 1981–83 war who not only inspired fear, but also had a loyal following with the younger men of honor. This was seen as a threat to Riina's control and, with Greco's wartime service all but forgotten, he was considered expendable.
- October 10 – Opening statements commence in the Federal trial United States of America v. Paul Castellano, et al.. Gambino boss Paul "Big Paul" Castellano and nine others were accused of operating an international auto-theft ring that shipped stolen cars to Kuwait and Puerto Rico, among other destinations. The defendants were also accused of committing five murders to protect the interests of the operation.
- November 12 – Anthony "Bruno" Indelicato, a soldier in the Bonanno crime family, is charged with the gangland slayings of former Bonanno crime family boss Carmine "Lilo" Galante, capo Leonardo "Nardo" Coppolla, and soldier Giuseppe "Joe" Turano.
- November 23 – Cleveland crime family boss James T. "Blackie" Licavoli dies of a heart attack at the age of 81 while serving a prison sentence at the Oxford Federal Correctional Institution in Oxford, Wisconsin.
- December 2 – Aniello "Mr. Niel" Dellacroce, underboss of the Gambino crime family, dies of brain cancer. A protégé of Albert "The Mad Hatter" Anastasia (also a mentor to future Gambino leader John "Johnny Boy" Gotti), having been passed over for leadership of the organization for the less popular Paul Castellano and the fact that "Big Paul" didn't pay his last respects to his loyal underboss at the wake causes much animosity throughout the organization. Despite Dellacroce's wishes for its members to remain loyal to the boss, his death triggers a coup against boss Paul Castellano.
- December 16 – Gambino crime family boss "Big" Paul Castellano is murdered, along with his new underboss and bodyguard Thomas "Tommy" Bilotti, outside of Manhattan's Sparks Steak House. John Gotti, the prime suspect in Castellano's assassination, quickly assumes leadership of the Gambino crime family.
- December 19 – Michael Franzese, a top capo in the Colombo crime family, is indicted under the RICO Act in connection to selling gasoline to retailers while failing to pay federal, state, and local taxes. Franzese is the son of Colombo Family member Jonn "Sonny" Franzese and is one of the biggest earners in Cosa Nostra history at one time making $5 million in cash per week for three years from his gasoline-bootlegging operations, delivering 30% to the Colombo hierarchy each week.

== Arts and literature ==
- Prizzi's Honor (film) starring Jack Nicholson.

== Deaths ==
- Frank D'Alfonso "Frankie Flowers", Philadelphia crime family associate
- Vincent Limoli, Massachusetts mobster
- September – Pino Greco, Sicilian boss of the Ciaculli family and the favorite hitman of Salvatore Riina
- December 2 – Aniello Dellacroce "Mr O'Neil"/"Polack", Gambino crime family underboss
- December 16 – Thomas Bilotti "The Rug", Gambino crime family underboss
- December 16 – Paul Castellano "Big Paul", Gambino crime family Boss
