= 1997 in organized crime =

== Events ==
- The gangs of Çole, Gaxhai and Pusi i Mezinit are established in Vlorë amidst the 1997 Albanian civil unrest.
- January 7 – "Fat" Herbie Blitzstein was shot to death inside his Las Vegas townhouse.
- June 6 – Arrest of Pietro Aglieri, boss of the Santa Maria di Gesù Mafia family in Palermo, in a disused lemon warehouse in the dilapidated industrial area Bagheria together with his "right hand" men, Natale Gambino and Giuseppe La Mattina. It took the authorities almost a year to locate him following the arrest of his right-hand man Carlo Greco. Apparently, Giovanni Brusca, a Riina loyalist arrested in May 1996, helped police identify Aglieri. He had been on the run since 1989.
- August – Masaru Takumi, the founding head of the Takumi-gumi, a large branch of the Yamaguchi-gumi, was assassinated by the Nakano-kai.

== Arts and literature ==
- 8 Heads in a Duffel Bag (film), starring Joe Pesci and David Spade
- Bella Mafia (film)
- Diaro una siciliana ribelle (film)
- Donnie Brasco (film), starring Al Pacino, Johnny Depp, Michael Madsen and Bruno Kirby.
- Hoodlum (film), starring Laurence Fishburne, Tim Roth and Andy García.
- Jackie Brown (film), starring Samuel L. Jackson, Michael Keaton and Robert De Niro.
- Suicide Kings (film)
- The Last Don (television miniseries), starring Danny Aiello, Joe Mantegna, and Burt Young.
- The St. Valentine's Day Massacre (documentary)
- Underboss: Sammy the Bull Gravano's Story of Life in the Mafia (non-fiction book), by Peter Maas.
- Brother (film)
- Face (film)

== Deaths ==
- January – Victor Spilotro, Chicago mobster and brother of Anthony Spilotro and Michael Spilotro
- January 2 – Sam Carlisi "Wings", Chicago Outfit boss
- May 31 – Johnny Papalia is murdered by Kenneth Murdock
- June 7 – Sam DeCavalcante "The Plumber", retired boss of the New Jersey mafia family
- August 28 – Masaru Takumi, founding head of the Takumi-gumi
- October 22 – Matthew "Mike" Trupiano Jr., St. Louis mafia boss
