= 1998 in organized crime =

== Events ==
- January 22 – Gambino crime family acting boss John Gotti, Jr., and 22 other associates were indicted on federal racketeering charges. Gotti later pleaded guilty to racketeering and extortion, and was sentenced to six year and five months in prison.
- March 19 – Philadelphia crime family soldier Anthony Turra was shot to death outside his home on his way to federal court, where he faced charges including the attempted murder of underboss Joseph Merlino.
- April 28 – Lucchese crime family acting boss Joseph "Little Joe" DeFede and 11 others were indicted on federal extortion and racketeering charges involving the family’s joint control of the Garment District in Manhattan with the Gambino and Genovese families. Defede would plead guilty to the extortion charges in 1998.
- May 24 – Sicilian drug kingpin Pasquale Cuntrera is arrested on Spain’s Costa del Sol, just five days after officials in Rome admitted that he had been released from prison on a technicality. Cuntrera would be brought back to Italy to serve a 21-year prison sentence.
- June 2 – Joseph Russo, a former top leader of the New England Patriarca crime family dies in a federal prison. Russo had been a power in the family after Raymond L.S. Patriarca died.

== Arts and literature ==
- American History X (film)
- Lock, Stock and Two Smoking Barrels (film)
- Out of Sight (film)
