= 1996 in organized crime =

== Events ==
- December 7 – Philadelphia crime family captain Joseph Sodano, based out of Newark, New Jersey, was shot to death for hiding money from the administration.

== Arts and literature ==
- The Funeral (film) starring Christopher Walken, Chris Penn, Vincent Gallo, Benicio del Toro and John Ventimiglia
- Gotti (film) starring Armand Assante, William Forsythe, Frank Vincent, Dominic Chianese, Vincent Pastore and Tony Sirico
- The Last Don (novel) by Mario Puzo
- Last Man Standing (film) starring Bruce Willis, Christopher Walken and Michael Imperioli
- Last Man Standing (film)
- Mad Dog Time (film) starring Gabriel Byrne, Richard Dreyfuss, Jeff Goldblum, Burt Reynolds and Billy Drago
- Bound (film)
- Fargo (film)
- Set It Off (film)
- The Substitute (film)

== Deaths ==
- March 12 – Jack "Spot" Comer, Jewish-English gangster (83)
- April 13 - James "Jimmy the Gent" Burke, Lucchese Family associate known for the Lufthansa heist.
- December 7 – Joseph Sodano, Philadelphia crime family captain
