= 1994 in organized crime =

== Arts and literature ==
- John H. Davis's Mafia Dynasty: The Rise and Fall of the Gambino Crime Family is published.
- Robert Rosenthal's Last Day of the Sicilians: The FBI's War Against the Mafia is published.
- Little Odessa (film)
- Pulp Fiction (film)

== Deaths ==
- Joey Abate, Lucchese crime family capo
- John D'Arco, Sr., Chicago alderman associated with the Chicago Outfit
- May 29 – John Tronolone "Peanuts", Cleveland mobster
- June 4 – Gregory Scarpa "The Grim Reaper", Colombo crime family capo, AIDS-related complications
- October 2 – Carl Civella "Corky", Kansas City mobster
- October 2 – Milton Rockman, associate and brother-in-law to John Scalish
- October 19 – Frank Diecidue "Daddy Frank", Trafficante underboss
- November 18 – Nicholas Bianco, Patriarca crime family underboss
