= 2000 in organized crime =

Organized Crimes in the Year 2000 C.E

== Events ==
- August 23 – Anthony "Tony Ducks" Corallo, longtime head of the Lucchese crime family, dies in prison after serving 13 years of a life imprisonment sentence.
- September 6 – Lucchese crime family acting boss Steven Crea, captains Dominic Truscello and Joseph Tangorra, soldiers Joseph Datello, Philip DeSimone, Anthony "Razor" Pezzullo, Joseph Truncale, and Arthur Zambardi, as well as associates Anthony Reynolds, Giuseppe Palmieri, Alessandro Palmieri, Michael Forde, President of both Local 608 of the United Brotherhood of Carpenters and Joiners of America and the N.Y.C. District Council of Carpenters and Martin Deveraux, a Local 608 business agent, were charged in a massive labor racketeering, kickback and extortion indictment handed down by the Manhattan District Attorney. All men would either be convicted or plead guilty, but a judge would later throw out Forde and Deveraux's convictions, citing anti-Irish sentiment expressed by members of the jury.

== Art and literature ==
- Chopper (film)
- Circus (film)
- Gangster No. 1 (film)
- Get Carter (Remake, film)
- Gone in 60 Seconds (Remake, film)
- Once in the Life (film)
- Reindeer Games aka Deception (film)
- Sexy Beast (film)
- Shaft (film)
- Snatch (film)
- The Whole Nine Yards (film)

== Deaths ==
- Donald Angelini "The Wizard of Odds", Chicago Outfit associate in Las Vegas
- Salvatore Santoro "Tom Mix", Lucchese crime family mobster
- August 23 – Anthony "Tony Ducks" Corallo, Lucchese crime family leader
- October 15 – Reggie Kray, UK crime boss, Kray Firm
