= Rudaj Organization =

Albanian mafia in the New York City metro area

- Founded: 1993
- Founding location: Westchester County, New York
- Years active: 1993–2004
- Territory: Queens, The Bronx, and Westchester County
- Ethnicity: Albanian, Italian, and Greek
- Membership: 22 defendants charged in RICO indictment
- Activities: Extortion, illegal gambling, murder, robbery
- Rivals: Lucchese crime family Gambino crime family Velentzas crime family

The Rudaj organization was a gang of Albanian-Americans active in the New York City metro area, named for the man accused of being its kingpin, Alex Rudaj of Yorktown, New York. The Rudaj organization, called "The Corporation" by its members, was started in 1990s in The Bronx and spread to Westchester County and Queens. Prosecutors say the Albanian gang was headed by Alex Rudaj and an Italian-American man named Nardino Colotti, who both had ties to the Gambino soldier Phil "Skinny" Loscalzo.

== Organization ==
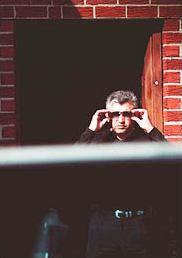
FBI surveillance photograph of Alex Rudaj, outside Jimbo's Bar in Astoria, Queens on April 15, 2003

Alex Rudaj (also known as Sandro Rudovic, Allie Boy, Uncle Rudaj, Xhaxhai,) of Yorktown, New York is the alleged boss of the Albanian mafia's Rudaj Organization, based in the New York City metro area. Rudaj is an ethnic Albanian from Ulcinj, Montenegro who immigrated to the United States in 1987. Federal prosecutors said Rudaj was the triggerman in a 1996 shooting of another organized crime figure after a high-speed chase in The Bronx. Rudaj hung out the sunroof of a car and fired at Guy Peduto as he fled in another car. They also described an incident where Rudaj showed up with 20 thugs to get late mob boss John Gotti's table at Rao's, the legendary and exclusive East Harlem Italian restaurant. On Friday, June 16, 2006, Alex Rudaj, 38, was sentenced to 27 years in federal prison for racketeering, extortion and gambling offenses.

Nardino Colotti (born 1963) of The Bronx, New York, is an Italian-American protégé of the Gambino soldier Phil (Skinny Phil) Loscalzo and co-leader of the Albanian mafia Rudaj Organization. Loscalzo allegedly promised Colotti territory with rackets to run in the Bronx and to propose him for Gambino family membership. However, when Loscalzo died, Sicilian Gambino soldier Joe Gambino took over his operations. Rudaj and Colotti didn't receive his territory and they neither wanted to work for Gambino, nor did they respect him. Therefore, in 1993 they became independent and founded their own organization. In addition to gambling dens in Queens the Rudaj Organization ran gambling operations in Mount Vernon and Port Chester. Nardino Colotti's group had a gambling joint on Adee Street in Port Chester and forced bar owners in Mount Vernon to install their illegal gambling machines. In one instance, Colotti's group tried to force Salvatore Misale, the owner of Puerto Roja in Mount Vernon, to hand over his bar to the Corporation. Misale went to authorities in 2003 after he endured a beating at a Bronx cafe over his refusal to hand over the keys to the bar. Lamaj (who?) sliced his ear off and then beat and cursed at him.

== Federal prosecution ==
On October 26, 2004, the FBI and Manhattan U.S. Attorney David Kelley announced the arrest of the group's alleged boss, Alex Rudaj, and 21 other reputed mob members charged in the indictment. Most of the defendants were native Albanians or first-generation Albanian-Americans,

During a bail hearing for one of the two dozen people arrested in the case, Assistant U.S. Attorney Timothy Treanor said that the Albanian mob had taken over gambling operations from the Lucchese family in Astoria, Queens. Rudaj led an attack in August 2001 on two Greek associates of the Lucchese crime family who ran a gambling racket inside a Greek social club on 30th St. in Queens. On August 3, 2001 Rudaj and at least six other men entered the club with guns, beating one of the men in the head with a pistol and chasing others out of the neighborhood by threatening to destroy the building.

Gambino leader Arnold Squitieri had had enough and wanted a talk with Rudaj. The meeting took place at a gas station in a rest area near the New Jersey turnpike. Twenty mobsters accompanied Squitieri, while Rudaj only brought six members of his crew. According to undercover FBI agent Joaquin Garcia, who infiltrated the Gambinos during this time period, Squitieri told Rudaj to stop expanding their operations. Both sides had weapons, but Rudaj threatened to blow up the gas station with all of them in it. This ended the discussion, and both groups pulled back.

By 2006 all of the main players involved in the meeting were in prison. Rudaj and personal driver and bodyguard Lumaj (who?) including all members of Sixth Family had been picked off the street in October 2004 and charged with a variety of racketeering and gambling charges. Rudaj and his main lieutenants were all found guilty at trial. In 2006, Rudaj, then 38, was sentenced to 27 years in prison. His rival Arnold Squitieri was convicted in an unrelated racketeering case and was sent to prison for seven years.

Over 20 members of the Rudaj organization were charged with various crimes. Six of its top leaders, including Alex Rudaj, were convicted. Ten more have pleaded guilty.

== Trouble with Velentzas family ==
On August 3, 2001, members of the Albanian Rudaj Organization, attacked Greek associates of the Lucchese crime family. The brief fight was over controlling gambling rackets in Astoria, Queens.

== See also ==
- Albanian Boys
