= 1968 in organized crime =

List of years in organized crime
- … 1958; 1959; 1960; 1961; 1962; 1963; 1964; 1965; 1966; 1967; 1968; 1969; 1970; 1971; 1972; 1973; 1974; 1975; 1976; 1977; 1978 …
- Art; Archaeology; Architecture; Literature; Music; Philosophy; Science; +...

== Events ==
- Gaspare Magaddino, syndicate gunman is killed in Brooklyn.
- New England mobster Rudolph Marfeo is murdered in Providence, Rhode Island.
- Sicilian Mafiosi backed politician, Salvatore Lima elected to the Italian Parliament.
- March 11 – Santo "Sam" Perrone, a member of the Bonanno crime family, Bill Bonanno bodyguard and owner of a Brooklyn trucking company, is killed by Gasperino DiGregorio Faction shooter Frank Mari.
- April 1 – Michael Consolo former veteran Bonanno Crime Family member, having defected to the DiGregorio Faction was killed by his own men for speaking cordially to Bill Bonanno in front of the Manhattan courthouse; it was taken that he was re-defecting back to the Bonanno Crime Family.
- September 18 – Bonanno Crime Family underboss Frank Mari and consigliere Michael Adamo disappear from Brooklyn. It is rumored that Mari and Adamo were plotting to remove boss Paul Sciacca from power so that they could take over the crime family, but their plans were revealed and they were eliminated, never being seen again.
- December 22 – Verdict of the Trial of the 114 in Catanzaro. Anti-Mafia judge Cesare Terranova had signed the order to send the men to trial in 1965. The defendants were accused of crimes relating to the First Mafia War. Amongst those on trial were the heads of the opposing factions in the Mafia War, Salvatore Greco and Angelo La Barbera, as well as the man who had actually triggered the war by framing La Barbera, Michele Cavataio. Also there were Giuseppe Calo and Luciano Leggio. The trial opened in December 1967. It resulted in few convictions, with several of those being just for "organized delinquency". This only carried a sentence of a few years, and most of those convicted of it were released instantly thanks to time already served. The longest sentence was handed to Angelo La Barbera, who was given twenty-two-years for ordering the kidnap and murder of two rival mobsters who had vanished in 1963 after they were seen being bundled off the streets; someone who witnessed the kidnapping testified for the prosecution despite death threats, one of the few witnesses to do so. Tommaso Buscetta was given a thirteen-year sentence for kidnapping the men but his conviction was in absentia because he was not present at the trial. He had fled Sicily after the Ciaculli Massacre to avoid the inevitable crackdown. Buscetta was captured in Brazil in 1973 and sent back to Sicily to serve his sentence. Salvatore Greco was sentenced to four years in absentia. No one was found guilty of the Ciaculli massacre.

== Arts and literature ==
- Giorno della civetta, Il (film)
- The Valachi Papers (non-fiction book) by Peter Maas

== Births ==
 • June 21 - Demetrius "Big Meech" Flenory Sr, founder of The Black Mafia Family

== Deaths ==
- Frank LaBruzzo, Former leader of the Bonanno crime family and brother-in-law to Joseph Bonanno
- Gaspare Magaddino, syndicate gunman and older brother of Stefano Magaddino
- Rudolph Marfeo, New England mobster
- Santo Perrone "Sam", Bonanno crime family member and owner of a Brooklyn trucking company
- Ellsworth Raymond "Bumpy" Johnson New York drug trafficking syndicate, controlled Harlem's drug scene for 15 years
- August 3 - Frank "Buster" Wortman, St. Louis Prohibition mobster and member of the Shelton Gang
