= 1973 in organized crime =

List of years in organized crime
- … 1963; 1964; 1965; 1966; 1967; 1968; 1969; 1970; 1971; 1972; 1973; 1974; 1975; 1976; 1977; 1978; 1979; 1980; 1981; 1982; 1983 …
- Art; Archaeology; Architecture; Literature; Music; Philosophy; Science; +...

== Events ==
- John F. Castagna, a Hartford, Connecticut-based associate of the Patriarca crime family associate, is convicted of manslaughter.
- February 13 – New York mobster and former leader of the Luciano crime family, Frank Costello dies of a heart attack at a Manhattan hospital.
- April 14 – Chicago Outfit associate, loan shark and sadistic murderer Sam "Mad Sam" DeStefano was shotgunned to death in his garage while out on bail. His killer(s) have never been caught.
- May 22 – While drinking at Snoope's, a local Staten Island bar and restaurant, Jimmy McBratney is shot and killed after fighting with three men claiming to be NYPD detectives (later revealed to be members of the Gambino crime family). McBratney's murder was most likely in connection to the December 1972 kidnapping of a Gambino crime family loanshark. One of the men, a 32-year-old John Gotti and future leader of the Gambino family, was reportedly the gunman who killed McBratney.
- July 29 – Paul Rothenberg, owner of an illegal film-processing lab being extorted by the Gambino Family, is shot to death by Gambino associate Roy DeMeo. Rothenberg was murdered after his business was raided by police and was pressured to cooperate by authorities.
- August 23 – Jan-Erik Olsson, a convict on parole, took four employees (three women and one man) of Kreditbanken, one of the largest banks in Stockholm, Sweden, hostage during a failed bank robbery. He negotiated the release from prison of his friend Clark Olofsson to assist him. They held the hostages captive for six days (23–28 August) in one of the bank's vaults. When the hostages were released, none of them would testify against either captor in court; instead, they began raising money for their defense. This led to the coining of the term 'Stockholm syndrome,' which describes the hostages' reactions as a result of being subjected to psychological manipulation by their captors.
- August 28 – Bonanno crime family boss Natale Evola died of natural causes. He was replaced by Philip Rastelli.
- October 25 – Lucchese crime family boss Carmine Tramunti was convicted on Federal perjury charges and sentenced to 5 years in prison. Carlo Gambino, who had come to dominate the New York commission, appointed caporegime Anthony Corallo as Tramunti’s successor.
- December 20 – Disgraced former cop, Richard Cain, was shot to death in a Chicago sandwich shop. Cain, whose real name was Richard Scalzitti, at one time was both a Chicago cop and on the Chicago Outfit payroll, under boss Salvatore "Sam," "Mooney" Giancana. Allegedly, Cain also became an FBI informant in the 1960s, before he rejoined the ousted boss, Giancana, in Mexico. Cain has also been linked to CIA activity, and many conspiracy theorists believe that Cain played a major part in the assassination of U.S. President John F. Kennedy.
- December 22 – Johnny Dioguardi, while nearing the completion of his five-year sentence, is charged and convicted of stock fraud. Vincenzo "Vinny" Aloi, a leading figure in the Colombo crime family, was also convicted.

== Arts and literature ==
- The Don Is Dead (film) starring Anthony Quinn.
- Mean Streets (film) starring Robert De Niro, Harvey Keitel and David Proval.
- The Outfit (film) starring Robert Duvall.
- Serpico (film) starring Al Pacino.
- The Seven-Ups (film) starring Roy Scheider and Tony Lo Bianco.
- The Sting (film) starring Paul Newman, Robert Redford and Robert Shaw.

== Deaths ==
- Michele Miranda "Mike", Genovese crime family
- February 13 – Frank Costello (Francesco Castiglia), New York mobster and leader of the Luciano crime family
- May 22 – Jimmy McBratney, New York criminal
- August 28 – Joe Diamond (Natale Evola), New York's "Bonanno Crime Family" leader and New York labor racketeer
- December 20 – Richard Cain, member of the Chicago Outfit and former Chicago police officer
