= 1962 in organized crime =

| List of years in organized crime |
- … 1952; 1953; 1954; 1955; 1956; 1957; 1958; 1959; 1960; 1961; 1962; 1963; 1964; 1965; 1966; 1967; 1968; 1969; 1970; 1971; 1972 …
- Art; Archaeology; Architecture; Literature; Music; Philosophy; Science; +...

== Events ==
- Former leader of the Philadelphia crime family, Salvatore Sabella dies.
- January 26 – Lucky Luciano dies of a heart attack in Naples, Italy, while meeting with Hollywood producers to discuss a movie based on his life. Possibly, as some theorize, the result of poisoning.
- April 8 – Genovese crime family Capo Anthony "Tony Bender" Strollo, a former gunman and lieutenant in the Maranzano crime family and head of criminal operations in Greenwich Village since 1931, disappears.
- June 6 – Joe Profaci dies of cancer. The Gallo-Profaci War continues however as brother-in-law Joseph Magliocco takes over the Profaci crime family following Profaci's death.
- On June 13, Simone Scozzari underboss of the Los Angeles crime family is deported to Italy.
- June 21 - In a case of mistaken identity, John Saupp is fatally assaulted by fellow inmate and New York mobster Joe Valachi at Atlanta Federal Penitentiary, and dies three days later. Valachi had thought Saupp was New York mobster Joseph DiPalermo, whom Valachi believed Mob Boss Vito Genovese had sent to kill him in prison.
- June 25 - Carmine Galante convicted for drugs charges.
- October 27 – On a flight from Sicily to the Milan Linate Airport, the Saulnier jetplane of Enrico Mattei crashes in the surroundings of the small village of Bascapè in Lombardy. Together with Mattei, his pilot Irnerio Bertuzzi and the American Journalist William McHale also died. Mattei was the president of Italy’s national oil company Ente Nazionale Idrocarburi (ENI). Under his direction ENI negotiated important oil concessions in the Middle East as well as a significant trade agreement with the Soviet Union. Official inquiries declared that the plane crash was an accident, but some Mafia turncoats – among the Tommaso Buscetta – have suggested that a special agreement had been achieved between the Cosa Nostra and "some foreigners" for the elimination of Mattei. The Italian Minister of Defense, Giulio Andreotti, was responsible for the accident investigation. Evidence was immediately destroyed at the crash site. Flight instruments were put into acid.
- December 26 – Sicilian Mafia boss Calcedonio Di Pisa is killed on the Piazza Principe di Camporeale in Palermo while walking to a tobacco kiosk. The brothers Salvatore and Angelo La Barbera are blamed for the killing, which was probably carried out by Michele Cavataio. Considered to be the start of the First Mafia War

== Deaths ==
- Salvatore Sabella, Leader of the Philadelphia crime family
- Anthony Strollo "Tony Bender", Genovese crime family Capo, former gunman and lieutenant in the Luciano crime family and head of criminal operations in Greenwich Village
- January 26 – Lucky Luciano (Salvatore Lucania), New York mobster and founder of the National Crime Syndicate and La Cosa Nostra Commission.
- June 6 – Joe Profaci "Olive Oil King", Leader of the Profaci crime family
- June 24 - John Saupp, criminal and Atlanta Federal Penitentiary prison inmate
