= Alphonse Attardi =

American mobster

Alphonse "The Peacemaker" Attardi (April 1, 1892 – July 17, 1970) was an American mobster with the Gambino crime family involved in narcotics who later became a government informant. His front was ownership of an olive oil importing business.

In the early 1950s, Attardi was arrested for drug trafficking in Houston, Texas. While in prison, his wife died and the bank foreclosed on his front business. Following his release from prison, Attardi moved to a dilapidated apartment on Delancey Street on New York's Lower East Side.

In 1952, U.S. Treasury Agents asked Attardi to become an informant. Fearing for his life, Attardi initially refused their offer. However, six months later Attardi changed his mind and agreed to assist agents in a sting operation. The sting began when Attardi introduced undercover agent Joe Tremoglie to several of his associates. Within ten months Tremoglie had become associated with major drug traffickers and organized crime figures such as Benny Bellanca and Pietro Beddia. Attardi's efforts let Tremoglie to infiltrate the New York Mafia's drug trade and, assisting in police surveillance, helped ensure the success of the sting operation.

Attardi received $5,000 from the government for his assistance and immediately left the country with his girlfriend. In 1968, Attardi gave an interview to Parade Magazine about his time in the mafia under the alias "Jim Carra".

Alphonse Attardi died on July 17, 1970.

== See also ==
- 1952 in organized crime
- 1970 in organized crime
