= Paper local =

Type of union

A paper local is a local union with no or few members, chartered by an existing union (usually an international or national union body) or self-chartered, and formed for the purpose of criminal activity. As implied by the name, paper locals often "exist only on paper", and have no members. In some cases, however, paper locals may have members, but the members are not workers but rather friends, family members, or criminal associates of the individual or individuals in control of the paper local.

Although paper locals may occur wherever labor unions are given formal, legal status and rights, they have been a particular problem in the United States. Paper locals are denounced by the AFL–CIO Code of Ethical Practices.

== Criminal uses of paper locals ==
=== Organized crime ===
Paper locals are often used as a means of extorting money. The individual who controls a paper local may threaten to unionize an employer's workers unless he receives a payoff. The paper local may even list the workers at a worksite as "members" and accept the payment as "union dues", when in fact the workers have not consented to forming or joining the union, have not paid dues, and do not receive the benefits of collective bargaining. In at least one case, a paper local based its extortion fee not on the number of workers an employer had but the number of coin-operated machines it had installed in local businesses.

Paper locals often enter into sweetheart contracts that are grossly unfair to workers, and then the employer and paper local embezzle money from the business. While a legitimate union contract might cost X amount of money in wages and benefits, the sweetheart contract costs much less; the difference is split between the individual(s) who control the paper local and the company owners. In one infamous example, a paper local and an employer entered into a sweetheart contract in which workers were able to take only one holiday off each year, Passover. Since the workers were almost all Puerto Rican and non-Jewish, they did not take the holiday off and the employer was not forced to pay workers for a day off.

When a paper local is controlled by organized crime, the paper local may also accept bribes in order to guarantee that there will be no strikes, grievances, or work stoppages (e.g., "labor peace"), or it may intimidate, coerce, vandalize, or sabotage the employer's competitors in order to protect the employer and a lucrative contract. This can create distinct competitive advantages for the employer, which can be higher than the bribes paid.

More recently, paper locals have been used for committing fraud. Paper locals have charged real estate developers for union services while hiring non-union workers (allowing the individual[s] controlling the paper local to pocket the difference in wages and benefits).

On occasion, employers have formed paper locals in order to establish company unions, and prevent unionization of their workforce.

=== Union democracy and fraud ===
Paper locals have sometimes been established by labor union leaders in efforts to fraudulently win internal elections. Perhaps the most famous example is the establishment of the "Dio locals" in the International Brotherhood of Teamsters in the mid-1950s. Midwestern Teamster leader Jimmy Hoffa wished to unseat Dave Beck, the union's international president. In October 1956, mobster Johnny Dio met with Hoffa in New York City and the two men conspired to create as many as 15 paper locals to boost Hoffa's delegate totals. When the paper locals applied for charters from the international union, Hoffa's political foes were outraged. A major battle broke out within the Teamsters over whether to charter the locals, and the media attention led to inquiries by the U.S. Department of Justice and the Permanent Subcommittee on Investigations of the U.S. Senate Committee on Government Operations. Beck and other Teamster leaders challenged the authority of the U.S. Senate to investigate the union, which caused the Senate to establish the Select Committee on Improper Activities in Labor and Management—a new committee with broad subpoena and investigative powers. Senator John L. McClellan, chair of the select committee, hired Robert F. Kennedy as the subcommittee's chief counsel and investigator.

The Select Committee (also known as the McClellan Committee, after its chairman), exposed widespread corruption in the Teamsters union. Beck fled the country for a month to avoid its subpoenas before returning. Four of the paper locals were dissolved to avoid committee scrutiny, several Teamster staffers were charged with contempt of Congress, union records were lost or destroyed (allegedly on purpose), and wiretaps were played in public before a national television audience in which Dio and Hoffa discussed the creation of even more paper locals. Beck appeared before the select committee for the first time on March 25, 1957, and notoriously invoked his Fifth Amendment right against self-incrimination 117 times. The McClellan Committee turned its focus to Hoffa and other Teamsters officials, and presented testimony and evidence alleging widespread corruption in Hoffa-controlled Teamster units. The scandals uncovered by the McClellan committee, which affected not only the Teamsters but several other unions, led directly to the passage of the Labor-Management Reporting and Disclosure Act (also known as the Landrum-Griffin Act) in 1959.

The use of paper locals may still be a problem for American labor unions. The Service Employees International Union (SEIU) has been accused of establishing paper locals (known in the union as "provisional locals") so that leaders can win election to office and dominate political opponents.

== Other uses ==
Paper locals can sometimes be used as a legitimate organizing tool. Some unions form them in industries where they have no foothold and yet anticipate organizing workers. This was a common organizing tool of the Industrial Workers of the World and International Ladies' Garment Workers' Union in the early part of the 20th century. The president of the Service Employees International Union has also been accused of creating "provisional locals with no members" in order to affect vote counts on union matters.
