= 1950s in organized crime =

This is a list of organized crime in the 1950s, arranged chronologically.

== 1950 ==
=== Events ===
- Boston mobster Philip Buccola flees the country to escape indictment for tax evasion. Before leaving the U.S., he turns over his criminal operations to mobster Raymond Patriarca, Sr. Patriarca would eventually transform this confederation of Italian street gangs into the Patriarca crime family.
- February 28 – Abraham Davidian is shot to death in Fresno, California while waiting to testify in a major West Coast narcotics investigation.
- April 6 – Kansas City, Missouri mob boss Charles Binaggio and his bodyguard, Charles Gargotta, are found shot to death. Binaggio would be succeeded by Anthony Gizzo.
- May 26 – The Senate Special Committee to Investigate Organized Crime in Interstate Commerce (later to be known as the Kefauver Committee) opens hearings in Miami, Florida. Committee hearings would continue in major cities throughout the country until August 17, 1951.
- June 5 – James Lumia, Florida organized crime figure, is gunned down on a street corner. The hit is believed to be ordered by Santo Trafficante, Sr.
- July 5 – The bandit and separatist Salvatore Giuliano is killed in Castelvetrano, Sicily. According to police, carabinieri captain Antonio Perenze shot and killed Guilano as he was resisting arrest. However, Gaspare Pisciotta, Giuliano's lieutenant, would later claim that he killed Giuliano on orders from Mario Scelba, then Italian Minister of the Interior. Pisciotta would say that police promised him a pardon and a reward if he killed Giuliano.
- September 25 – William Drury, a former acting police captain in Chicago, and Marvin Bas, attorney for the Republican nominee for Cook County Sheriff, are shot to death at separate locations in Chicago. Police believe the two men were murdered due to information they provided the Kefauver Committee on organized crime activities in Chicago. Chicago Outfit mobsters Paul Ricca and Louis Campagna would be held for questioning in the murder, but due to lack of evidence are never formally charged.

=== Births ===
- Carlos Lehder, Medellín Cartel co-founder
- Joseph Tangorra, Lucchese crime family, Capo

=== Deaths ===
- Marvin Bas, Chicago syndicate defence lawyer
- Julius Benvenuti, Chicago syndicate gambling racketeer and operator of the Buffalo-Erie policy wheel
- February 28 – Abraham Davidian, government witness
- April 5 – Charles Binaggio, Kansas City crime family leader
- April 6 – Charles Gargotta, bodyguard to Charles Binaggio
- June 5 – James Lumia, Tampa crime family leader

== 1951 ==
=== Events ===
- New York mobster Mickey Cohen, a rival of Los Angeles syndicate boss Jack Dragna, is convicted of income tax evasion.
- April 16 – Sam Maceo, former underboss of the Texas crime syndicate, dies of natural causes while at a hospital in Baltimore, Maryland.
- April 19 – Shortly after the disappearance of Vincent Mangano (who, according to underworld lore, was murdered and buried in the concrete foundation of a housing project owned by Anastasia), New York mobster Philip Mangano is found dead in a marsh near Jamaica Bay. Former Mangano lieutenant Albert Anastasia, backed by Frank Costello, takes over the family after Mangano's murder. Although Anastasia, Joe Adonis and Frank Costello are questioned in connection with the incident, no charges are filed. Before their deaths, the Mangano brothers had controlled the New York waterfront for nearly two decades since the murders of Alfred Mineo and Steve Ferrigno in 1930 during the Castellammarese War.
- New York mobster Thomas Gagliano, leader of the present day Lucchese crime family, goes into semi-retirement and leaves day-to-day activities of the Family to Acting Boss Thomas Lucchese.
- May 28 – Joe Adonis is convicted for gambling violations and sentenced to two years in New Jersey State Prison.
- August 6 – Tony Brancato and Tony Trombino, known as the "Two Tony's", are found shot to death in the front seat of an abandoned car in Los Angeles. Both Brancato and Trombino had been identified robbing a syndicate-controlled Nevada hotel.
- September 8 – Meyer Lansky is charged with operating illegal gambling in Saratoga Springs, New York.
- October 4 – New Jersey mobster Willie Moretti is killed by four unidentified gunman while at a restaurant in Cliffside Park, New Jersey.
- October 20 – The Revenue Act of 1951 is officially signed into law, which would becoming effective November 1, establishing wagering excise and occupational taxes. Although later declared unconstitutional by the Supreme Court in 1968, the statute forced many leading bookmakers to move their respective gambling operations out of the United States for several years.
- November 20 – After decades of corruption, New York Governor Thomas E. Dewey orders the New York State Crime Commission to conduct an investigation of the New York waterfront.

=== Arts and literature ===
- The Enforcer (film) starring Humphrey Bogart.
- The Glenrowan Affair (film)

=== Births ===
- Dennis Allen "Dr. Death", Melbourne based drug dealer and murderer.
- April – Cesare Bonventre, Bonanno-Galante crime family captain.
- May 27 – Michael Franzese, member of the Colombo crime family.
- June – Keith Faure, Melbourne crime figure.
- June 30 – Salvatore LoCascio, high-ranking member of the Gambino crime family.

=== Deaths ===
- April – Philip Mangano, New York mobster and waterfront labor racketeer
- April 19 – Vincent Mangano, New York mobster and waterfront labor racketeer
- April 16 – Sam Maceo, Texas crime syndicate underboss
- August 6 – Tony Brancato, Kansas City mobster
- August 6 – Tony Trombino, New York mobster
- October 31 – Kierstin Powers, New York Mobster

== 1952 ==
=== Events ===
- Alfred Topliz, the Democratic leader of Manhattan's First Assembly and supposed associate of New York mobsters Michael "Trigger Mike" Coppola and Frank Erickson, appears before the New York Crime Commission.
- March 9 – A Brooklyn shoe salesman by the name of Arnold Schuster is killed, his death ordered Albert Anastasia for his role in the capture of bank robber Willie "The Actor" Sutton. Schuster's murder would bring unwanted attention and public scrutiny on organized crime.
- March 18 – Joseph Vallone, former head of the Milwaukee crime family, dies. His successor Sam Ferrara, who had controlled the organization since Vallone's retirement in 1949, is forced by the Chicago Outfit to step down around November or December after a request by members of the criminal organization and replaced by John Alioto.
- April 27 – Over 80 organized crime figures are observed attending a party, reportedly in celebration of Raymond L.S. Patriarca's appointment as head the New England crime family, having succeeded Philip Buccola, who had fled to Italy following a tax evasion investigation.
- May – A conference is held by the National Crime Syndicate in the Florida Keys.
- August 15 – Frank Costello is convicted of contempt of court, after walking out during his testimony before the Kefauver Committee, and sentenced to 18 months imprisonment.

=== Births ===
- December 3 – Benjamín Arellano Félix, Mexican drug lord and Tijuana Cartel member

=== Deaths ===
- March 9 – Arnold Schuster, Brooklyn salesman and murder victim

== 1953 ==
=== Events ===
- Kansas City mobster Joseph Benintende is imprisoned after being convicted for his role in the NCAA point shaving scandal.
- May 2 – Meyer Lansky is convicted of illegal gambling, after pleading guilty to five of the total twenty one charges, and serves three months in a New York prison. He is additionally fined $2,500 and, after his release, receives three years probation.
- June 19 – Stephen Franse, a police informant, is murdered by Genovese crime family hitman Joe Valachi.
- July 16 – Shortly after his release from prison, Joe Adonis is faced with perjury charges.
- August 5 – U.S. Attorney General Herbert Brownell Jr. orders the deportation of Joe Adonis after it is found Adonis had lied of his birthplace in Passaic, New Jersey and found to have immigrated from Naples, Italy.
- October 29 – New York mobster Frank Costello is released from prison, following his arrest for contempt of court during the Kefauver Committee the previous year.
- December 9 - Dominick Petrilli, sneaking into the United States shortly after being deported, is killed by rival gunman. Petrilli had brought Joe Valachi, later a government informant, into the Genovese crime family.

=== Deaths ===
- June 19 – Stephen Franse, NYPD police informant
- December 9 - Dominick Petrilli, New York mobster

== 1954 ==
=== Events ===
- Facing a shortage of "soldiers" and other low level members, New York's Five Families begin actively recruiting members after a twenty-year hiatus.
- Salvatore Bonanno, the son of mafia boss Joseph Bonanno, becomes a "made man" and an official member of the Bonanno crime family.
- February 9 – In Sicily, the bandit Gaspare Pisciotta dies in his cell from strychnine poisoning while on trial. Pisciotta had claimed that he killed his companion and separatist Salvatore Giuliano on orders from Mario Scelba, then Italian Minister of the Interior.
- March 25 – Joe Adonis is convicted of perjury and sentenced to two years in a federal penitentiary. Facing a deportation order from 1954, Adonis offers to leave the country voluntarily while the verdict is under appeal as an alternative to jail time.
- March 27 – Johnny Dio is convicted on charges of evading New York state income taxes, and sentenced to 60 days in prison.
- April 11 – The Rome daily newspaper Avanti! publishes a photograph of a candy factory in Palermo under the headline "Textiles and Sweets on the Drug Route." The factory was reportedly set up by Calogero Vizzini and Italian-American gangster Lucky Luciano in 1949. In the evening after the story is published, the factory closes and the laboratory's chemists are reportedly smuggled out of the country. Police suspected that the factory was a cover for heroin trafficking.
- July 10 – Calogero Vizzini the Mafia boss of Villalba in Sicily, dies. Vizzini was considered to be one of the most influential Mafia bosses of Sicily after World War II. Thousands of peasants dressed in black, politicians, and priests would take part in his funeral. Attendees would include Mussomeli boss Giuseppe Genco Russo and the powerful boss Don Francesco Paolo Bontade from Palermo (the father of future Mafia boss Stefano Bontade) – who was one of the pallbearers. An elegy for Vizzini would be pinned to the church door. It read: "Humble with the humble. Great with the great. He showed with words and deeds that his Mafia was not criminal. It stood for respect for the law, defence of all rights, greatness of character: it was love."
- July–December – According to FBI reports, several meetings between Mafia leaders are observed in Los Angeles, California, Chicago, Illinois and Mountainside, New Jersey.

=== Arts and literature ===
- On the Waterfront (film) starring Marlon Brando.

=== Births ===
- Joaquin Guzman-Loera – Mexican drug baron

=== Deaths ===
- Calogero Vizzini, Sicilian mafiosi

== 1955 ==
=== Events ===
- In 1955, the bosses of the Acquasanta Mafia clan, Gaetano Galatolo and Nicola D’Alessandro were killed in a dispute over the protection rackets when the Palermo fruit and vegetable wholesale market moved from the Zisa area to Acquasanta, disturbing the delicate power balances within Cosa Nostra. The killer of Galatolo was never identified, but Michele Cavataio was suspected. Cavataio became the new boss of the clan and had to agree to split the profits of the wholesale market racket with the Greco Mafia clan of Ciaculli, who traditionally controlled fruit and vegetable supply to Palermo wholesale market.
- March 31 – Stefano Bedami, New Jersey Family Boss is stabbed to death in a Newark, New Jersey restaurant.
- Nicolo Impastato, a Sicilian mafiosi and drug trafficker, is deported to Italy by the Mexican government.
- August 25 – Meyer Lansky's Casino Internacional, the earliest of Havana's syndicate casinos, is taken over by Moe Dalitz and Sam Tucker. It would eventually be sold to Mike McLaney, only six months before the Cuban Revolution and seized by the Castro regime.
- November 4 - Willie Bioff, a former pimp, labor racketeer and Chicago Outfit associate who had testified against his fellow conspirators in the extortion of Hollywood movie studios in the 1930s and early 1940s, is killed when a bomb planted on his pickup truck explodes outside his home in Phoenix, Arizona. Bioff, who had been living under an assumed name, had recently begun working at the Outfit-controlled Riviera Casino in Las Vegas, which tipped off the Outfit mobsters as to his whereabouts.

=== Deaths ===
- May 30 - Louis Campagna, "Little New York" Chicago Outfit member
- November 4 - Willie Bioff, former Chicago Outfit associate

== 1956 ==
=== Events ===
- Antonino "Tony," "Joe Batters" Accardo decides to retire from the Chicago Outfit and appoints Salvatore "Sam," "Mooney" Giancana to oversee day-to-day operations of the crime syndicate. However, Accardo remains a presence in the organization serving in an advisory capacity and usually has the final say on all important Outfit business and "hits".
- Carlo Gambino is made underboss by Albert Anastasia, in what would later become the Gambino crime family.
- January 3 – Unable to convince federal officials of his citizenship, Joe Adonis agrees to comply with his deportation to Italy in agreement to drop the perjury charges. With the departure of Adonis, the struggle of the Frank Costello–Albert Anastasia faction to gain control over the Luciano crime family from Vito Genovese grows even more desperate.
- Frank DeSimone becomes leader of the Los Angeles crime family following the death of Jack Dragna.
- April 5 – After journalist Victor Riesel is assaulted and blinded with acid, mobster Johnny Dio is charged with the attack. However police are forced to drop the charges when witnesses against him disappeared or retracted their statements. Despite this, Riesel would continue his crusade against organized crime though radio and newspaper reports.
- May 14 – Frank Costello is convicted of tax evasion and is sentenced to federal prison.
- May 18 – Over thirty-five known mobsters are observed by federal agents in a meeting in New York.
- October 17–18 – After nearly a year of inactivity, federal agents observe a meeting among organized crime figures in Binghamton, New York.

=== Births ===
- October 11 – Eduardo Arellano Félix, Mexican drug lord and Tijuana Cartel member

== 1957 ==
=== Events ===
- The Mexican Mafia criminal group is created by Chicano gang members in the Deuel Vocational Institution in Tracy, California.
- March – Teamster's Union President Dave Beck is brought before the U.S. Senate Select Committee on Improper Activities in Labor and Management (McClellan Committee) where he is charged with misappropriation of union funds well as his ties to organized crime figures by Chief Counsel Robert F. Kennedy and is imprisoned later that year. Nathan Shefferman, a Chicago Teamsters Union official and longtime associate, is also called before the committee to testify on related charges.
- March 11 – Frank Costello is released from federal custody as his case is reviewed by the United States Supreme Court.
- May 2 – Frank Costello, surviving an assassination attempt, retires as the leader of the Luciano crime family as Vito Genovese assumes control.
- June 17 – Frank Scalise, Anastasia Family underboss, is killed by Jimmy Squilante, on Anastasia's orders, after selling La Cosa Nostra memberships for $50,000 and screwing up a heroin deal. Anastasia lieutenant Carlo Gambino is named underboss.
- July 25 – Johnny Dio is convicted of bribery and conspiracy as part of a labor racketeering case in New York City garment district and sentenced to two years in prison.
- September 19 – Joseph Scalise is killed by James Squillante (Albert Anastasia's nephew) and disposed of by Squilante's garbage hauling interests after a welcome home party for threatening to avenge his brother, Frank Scalise's murder.
- October 12–16 – Grand Hotel des Palmes Mafia meeting. American gangster Joseph Bonanno attends a series of meetings between some high-level Sicilian and American mafiosi in the Grand Hotel des Palmes (Albergo delle Palme) in Palermo, Sicily. The Sicilian Mafia decides to compose its first Sicilian Mafia Commission and elects Salvatore Greco as its first "secretary". According to some, one of the main topics on the agenda was the organisation of the heroin trade on an international basis. The FBI believed it was this meeting that established the Bonanno Crime Family in the heroin trade.
- October 25 – Albert Anastasia is murdered in a New York barbershop on the orders of Vito Genovese and Lt. Carlo Gambino (the decision was supported by Tommy Lucchese, Meyer Lansky and Tampa Boss Santo Trafficante Jr.). The Genovese-Gambino-Lucchese alliance wanted to make Gambino Boss of Anastasia's Family, the Lansky-Trafficante alliance was angered by Anastasia muscling into the Havana, Cuba casino rackets.
- November 10 – A meeting is held in Livingston, New Jersey, possibly in connection to the Apalachin Conference.
- November 14 – Over sixty organized crime figures including Vito Genovese, Carlo Gambino, Paul Castellano, Joseph Bonanno, Joseph Profaci, Joseph Magliocco and John Montana are arrested at the home of Joseph Barbara, Sr. during the Apalachin Conference. Following this incident, federal authorities are forced to admit the possibility of the existence of organized crime.

=== Deaths ===
- David Berman, Las Vegas mobster
- June 17 – Frank Scalise, New York mobster
- September 19 – Joseph Scalise, brother of Frank Scalise
- October 25 – Albert Anastasia "Lord High Executioner"/"The Mad Hatter", Gambino crime family boss

== 1958 ==
=== Events ===
- Somewhere in 1958 the Sicilian Mafia composed its first Sicilian Mafia Commission. It was formed among Mafia families in the province of Palermo, which had the highest concentration of cosche (Mafia families), approximately 46. Salvatore "Ciaschiteddu" Greco was appointed as its first segretario (secretary) or rappresentante regionale, essentially a "primus interpares" – the first among equals. Initially, the secretary had very little power. His task was simply to organize the meetings.
- As a result of the Apalachin Conference, the FBI is forced to acknowledge the existence of organized crime and begins compiling a detailed report on the Mafia, known as, "La Cosa Nostra".
- In a prelude to the Gallo-Profaci gang war, Gallo begins operating independently of the Profaci crime family.
- January 9 – Hitman Elmer "Trigger" Burke is executed for the murder of bartender Edward Walsh.
- August 2 – Sicilian mafia boss, Michele Navarra murdered by Bernardo Provenzano and Salvatore Riina on the orders of Luciano Leggio, who subsequently becomes boss of the Corleonesi.
- September 7 - John "the Mortician" Robilotto, a suspected gunman involved in the murder of Willie Moretti, is shot and killed sometime after 3 a.m., his body dumped in a gutter in Brooklyn. He had been shot four times in the head with a .38 caliber pistol.

=== Arts and literature ===
- I Mobster (film)

=== Births ===
- February 21 – Salvatore Cuffaro, Sicilian President and mafia associate
- November 11 – Victor Peirce, Melbourne underworld figure and Pettingil family member
- February 4 - John Zancocchio, Bonanno Crime Family member

=== Deaths ===
- January 9 – Elmer "Trigger" Burke, Hitman
- August 2 – Michele Navarra, Sicilian (Corleonesi) mafia boss
- September 7 - John Robilotto, Albert Anastasia gunman

== 1959 ==
=== Events ===
- January 1 – Syndicate casinos are seized by Fidel Castro government after Cuban dictator Fulgencio Batista flees the country following the Cuban Revolution. Suffering a major financial setback, Meyer Lansky returns to Miami, Florida and begins looking into the possible relocation of syndicate casinos in the Bahamas and Caribbean.
- February 26 – New Jersey mobster Abner Zwillman is found dead in his home after apparently hanging himself with a plastic clothesline. An investigated ruled suicide as the cause of death as Zwillman was facing federal investigation into his coin-operated machine business and tax evasion.
- April 17 – Vito Genovese, boss of the Genovese crime family is convicted of drug trafficking and is sentenced to 15 years. Vincent Gigante, Genovese's driver and bodyguard to 7 years and Bonanno Crime Family lieutenant Natale Joseph Evola is also imprisoned. Thomas Eboli, Jerry Catena, Michele Miranda, Anthony Strollo and Phil Lombardo are placed on a "committee" to run the Genovese crime family operations following Genovese's imprisonment.
- June 9 – During his appearance for questioning before the McClellan Committee, Chicago mobster Sam Giancana refuses to answer the questions while repeatedly citing the Fifth Amendment, often punctuating his responses with a terse chuckle, to which a clearly frustrated chief counsel Robert F. Kennedy retorts, "I thought only little girls giggled, Mr. Giancana."
- September 25 – After being called away from a Lexington Avenue restaurant, Anthony Carfano and his companion, Janice Drake are found dead in an abandoned car in Queens. A police investigation ruled both had been shot in the back of the head, possibly by a gunman hidden in the back seat.
- December 18 – Paul Castellano is convicted of obstructing a government investigation and sentenced to five years imprisonment, although he is released after seven months.

=== Births ===
- November 14 – Vincent Basciano "Vinny Gorgeous", Bonanno crime family boss

=== Deaths ===
- September 25 – Anthony Carfano "Little Augie Pisano", Genovese crime family underboss
- September 25 – Janice Drake, murder victim
- November 4 – Frank Abbatemarco, Colombo crime family capo
