= Ned Warren Sr. =

Swindler convicted of land fraud in Arizona, USA

Ned Warren Sr. (aka Nathan Waxman) (1914–1980) was a convicted swindler, known as the "godfather of land fraud" in Arizona.

Warren was born Nathan Jacques Waxman in Boston, Massachusetts. He graduated from Worcester Academy and briefly attended the University of Pennsylvania. He was convicted in 1949 of mail fraud for taking $39,000 from investors to produce a non-existent Broadway play "The Happiest Days," and served time in Sing Sing prison. He also served time in 1959 for bankruptcy fraud.

Warren arrived in Arizona in 1961. Warren was reportedly sent by "New York underworld members ... to develop a land‐fraud operation". He operated dozens of land sales companies, including Western Growth Capital Corp. and Consolidated Mortgage Corp. The companies sold land in Cochise, Maricopa, Yuma and Yavapai Counties. They misrepresented the land to investors as being habitable, when the land parcels often lacked paved roads, other improvements or access to utilities. They would also sell the same parcel of land to multiple buyers and sell the same mortgages on these parcels to multiple lenders. The Arizona Attorney General brought suit to dissolve Consolidate Mortgage Corp. for its involvement in land fraud. The corporation was placed in receivership and was dissolved in 1982.

Several people associated with Warren were murdered. Accountant Ed Lazar was murdered in a Phoenix parking garage in February 1975 by two Chicago mafia hitmen (Nick D'Andrea and Robert Hardin) one day before Lazar was scheduled to testify before a grand jury about his dealings with Warren. He had previously testified to the same grand jury that Warren had bribed Arizona real estate commissioner J. Fred Talley. Tony Serra was the sales manager of Great Southwest Land and Cattle Company, a company believed to be controlled by Warren, and had been convicted of land fraud charges in 1974. Serra was brutally murdered in prison in January 1977.

In September 1975, Warren was convicted in Seattle of extortion, along with his son-in-law, Gale Nace. He was sentenced to 12-years in prison, but appealed the case and never served any time for the conviction. In 1978, Warren was convicted in Arizona on 20 counts of land fraud and two bribery charges, and was sentenced to 54 to 60 years in prison. He died in October 1980 while in prison.
