= 1975 in organized crime =

In 1975, a number of events took place in organized crime.

== Events ==
- Anthony Milano, an operator of the syndicate controlled Brotherhood Loan Company and underboss of the Cleveland Mafia, retires and succeeded by Leo "The Lips" Moceri.
- Salvatore D'Aquilla, an associate of the Patriarca crime family, is charged and later convicted of running illegal gambling operations out of the Saybrook Yacht Club based near Middletown, Connecticut.
- February 19 – Edward Lazar, a government witness against the "land fraud godfather" racketeer Ned Warren Sr., is killed.
- June 13 – Andrei Katz is stabbed to death and then dismembered by members of a crew led by Gambino associate Roy DeMeo.
- June 19 – Salvatore "Sam," "Mooney" Giancana, leader of the Chicago Outfit, is murdered while in his home in Oak Park, a suburb of Chicago, Illinois. Giancana, who had recently called him to testify before the Senate Select Committee on Intelligence, had also been discovered to have been involved in Operation Mongoose, in which both the CIA and the National Crime Syndicate cooperated in the planned assassination of Cuba's socialist prime minister Fidel Castro.
- July 1 – Gambino crime family captain and acting boss Paul Castellano and 8 associates were charged with "forming an enterprise that was designed to operate by collecting debts that had resulted from usurious loans." A directed acquittal was ordered on November 16, 1976, following the refusal of the principal witness to testify in the trial.
- July 30 – Jimmy Hoffa, reportedly attempting to reconcile with mobster associates (possibly Anthony Provenzano and Anthony Giacalone or Russell Bufalino) in his attempts to regain his position as president of the Teamsters Union, leaves for a meeting at the Machus Red Fox restaurant in Bloomfield Hills, Michigan. His last known contact was a phone call to his wife at 2:15 pm, before his disappearance. Despite the massive manhunt by federal authorities, no clue as to the fate of Jimmy Hoffa was ever found.
- August 2 – Jacob Molinas, recently convicted of bribing New York basketball players, is killed by mobsters in his Los Angeles home. One of those suspected of Molinas murder is Michael Zaffarano, a Bonanno crime family capo involved in the pornography industry.
- September 7 – Carmine Consalvo, a member of the Gambino crime family and a large scale cocaine dealer, is thrown out of a window of his Fort Lee, NJ apartment and killed for not stopping his drug operations and not sharing the profits. His brother Frank Consalvo, who would attempt to avenge his brother's death, would be thrown off his penthouse apartment balcony by Gambino members later that year. Authorities dubbed it "The Murder Of The Flying Consalvos".
- September 11 – August "Augie" Maniaci, a Wisconsin mobster recently turned FBI informant, is murdered.

== Arts and literature ==
- French Connection II (film) starring Gene Hackman.

== Deaths ==
- December 4 - Francis J. "Frank" Consalvo, Gambino crime family associate and brother of Carmine Consalvo
- February 19 – Edward Lazar, government witness
- June 19 – Sam Giancana "Momo"/"Mooney", Chicago Outfit leader
- August 2 – Jacob Molinas, Bonanno crime family associate
- September 7 – Carmine Consolvo, Gambino crime family member
- September 11 – August Maniaci "Augie", Wisconsin mobster and government informant
