= 1960 in organized crime =

In 1960, a number of events took place in organized crime.

== Events ==
- April 7 – Johnny Dio is convicted of income tax evasion and later sentenced to four years imprisonment and a $5,000 fine.
- November 28 – Twenty mobsters arrested at the Apalachin Conference in 1957 are acquitted of conspiracy charges by a US appeals court.

== Arts and literature ==
- Murder, Inc. (film) starring Henry Morgan, Peter Falk, Vincent Gardenia and Howard Smith.
- The Purple Gang (film) starring Barry Sullivan and Robert Blake.

== Births ==
- Carmine Agnello, member of Gambino crime family
- June 21 – Costabile Farace, Mafia associate
- September – Luigi Putrone, Sicilian Mafia boss

== Deaths ==
Ezio Galanzo (1932 - 1965), member of the Gambino Crime Family
