= United States Senate Select Committee on Improper Activities in Labor and Management =

Former U.S. Senate committee

The United States Senate Select Committee on Improper Activities in Labor and Management (also known as the McClellan Committee or the Rackets Committee) was a select committee created by the United States Senate on January 30, 1957 and dissolved on March 31, 1960. The select committee was directed to study the extent of criminal or other improper practices in the field of labor-management relations or in groups of employees or employers, and to recommend changes in the laws of the United States that would provide protection against such practices or activities. It conducted 253 active investigations, served 8,000 subpoenas for witnesses and documents, held 270 days of hearings, took testimony from 1,526 witnesses (343 of whom invoked the Fifth Amendment), and compiled almost 150,000 pages of testimony. At the peak of its activity in 1958, 104 persons worked for the committee. The select committee's work led directly to the enactment of the Labor-Management Reporting and Disclosure Act (Public Law 86-257, also known as the Landrum-Griffin Act) on September 14, 1959.

== Background and creation ==
In December 1952, Robert F. Kennedy was appointed assistant counsel for the Committee on Government Operations by the then-chairman of the committee, Senator Joseph McCarthy. Kennedy resigned in July 1953, but rejoined the committee staff as chief minority counsel in February 1954. When the Democrats regained the majority in January 1955, Kennedy became the committee's chief counsel. Soon thereafter, the Permanent Subcommittee on Investigations of the U.S. Senate Committee on Government Operations, under the leadership of Democratic Senator John L. McClellan of Arkansas (chair of the committee and subcommittee), began holding hearings into labor racketeering (labor, racketeering).

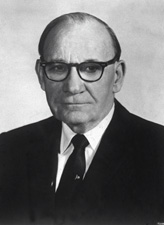
Senator John L. McClellan (D–Arkansas), chair of the Select Committee.

Much of the Permanent Subcommittee's work focused on a scandal which emerged in 1956 in the powerful trade union, the International Brotherhood of Teamsters. In the mid-1950s, Midwestern Teamster leader Jimmy Hoffa began an effort to unseat Dave Beck, the union's international president. In October 1955, mobster Johnny Dio met with Hoffa in New York City and the two men conspired to create as many as 15 paper locals (fake local unions which existed only on paper) to boost Hoffa's delegate totals. When the paper locals applied for charters from the international union, Hoffa's political foes were outraged. A major battle broke out within the Teamsters over whether to charter the locals, and the media attention led to investigations by the U.S. Department of Justice and the Permanent Subcommittee on Investigations.

Beck and other Teamster leaders subsequently challenged the authority of the Permanent Subcommittee to investigate the union by arguing that the Senate's Labor and Public Welfare Committee had jurisdiction over labor racketeering, not Government Operations. McClellan objected to the transfer of his investigation to the Labor Committee because he felt the Labor chairman, Senator John F. Kennedy, was too close to union leaders and would not thoroughly investigate organized labor.

To solve its jurisdictional and political problems, the Senate established on January 30, 1957, an entirely new committee, the Select Committee on Improper Activities in Labor and Management, and gave it broad subpoena and investigative powers. The new select committee was given a year to complete its work, and charged with studying the extent of criminal or other improper practices in the field of labor-management relations or in groups of employees or employers. Half the membership was drawn from the Committee on Government Operations and half from the Committee on Labor and Public Welfare. McClellan, Ervin, McCarthy, and Mundt were drawn from Government Operations, and Kennedy, McNamara, Ives, and Goldwater from Labor. An equal number of Democrats and Republicans sat on the Select Committee.

Senator McClellan was named chair of the Select Committee, and Republican Senator Irving Ives of New York vice chair. Democrats and liberals, primarily, criticized the committee for not having a neutral attitude toward labor. Only three of the committee's eight members looked on organized labor favorably, and only one of them (Senator Patrick McNamara) was strongly pro-labor. The committee's other five members were strongly pro-management, and that included Senator McClellan. McClellan hired Robert F. Kennedy, a 31-year-old attorney from Massachusetts, as the subcommittee's chief counsel and investigator. Kennedy, too, did not have a neutral opinion of labor unions. Appalled by stories he had heard about union intimidation on the West Coast, Kennedy undertook the chief counsel's job determined to root out union malfeasance and with little knowledge or understanding of or even concern over management misbehavior. The biases of the Select Committee members and its chief counsel, some observers concluded, led the committee to view corruption in labor-management relations as a problem with unions, not management, and management as nothing more than a victim.

Senator McClellan gave Robert Kennedy extensive control over the scheduling of testimonies, areas of investigation, and questioning of witnesses. This suited McClellan, a conservative Democrat and opponent of labor unions: Robert Kennedy would take the brunt of organized labor's outrage, while McClellan would be free to pursue an anti-labor legislative agenda once the hearings began to draw to a close. Republican members of the Select Committee voiced strong disagreement with McClellan's decision to let Kennedy set the direction for the committee and ask most of the questions, but McClellan largely ignored their protests. Robert Kennedy proved to be an inexpert interrogator, fumbling questions and engaging in shouting matches with witnesses rather than laying out legal cases against them. McClellan and Kennedy's goal had been to refer nearly all their investigations to the Justice Department for prosecution, but the department refused to do so because it concluded that nearly all the legal cases were significantly flawed. A frustrated Robert Kennedy publicly complained about the Justice Department's decisions in September 1958.

Chief Counsel Kennedy resolved to investigate a wide range of labor unions and corporations, including the International Brotherhood of Teamsters, the United Auto Workers (UAW), Anheuser-Busch, Sears, and Occidental Life Insurance. The Select Committee also established formal liaisons with the Federal Bureau of Investigation (FBI), Internal Revenue Service, Federal Narcotics Bureau, Department of Labor, and other federal agencies as well as state and local offices and officials involved in law enforcement.

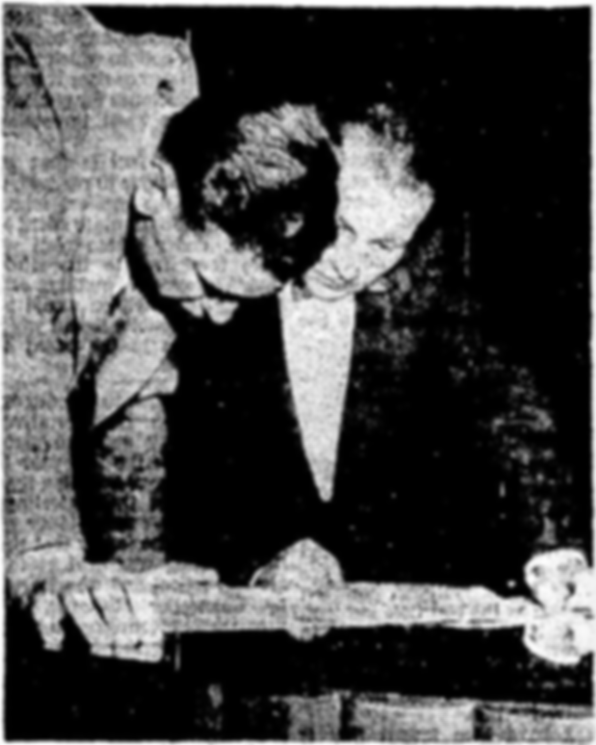
In April 1956 The Oregonian ran a series reporting its investigation of corruption involving the Teamsters and local officials. The series would ultimately win the Pulitzer Prize, and lead to the indictment of several officials, and the conviction and removal from office of district attorney William Langley (left). This Associated Press photo depicts Langley reading the Oregonian's initial report the day it was published.

== Investigations ==
The Select Committee focused its attention for most of 1957 on the Teamsters union. Teamsters President Dave Beck fled the country for a month to avoid its subpoenas before returning in March 1957. The Select Committee had a difficult time investigating the Teamsters. Four of the paper locals were dissolved to avoid committee scrutiny, several Teamster staffers provided verbal testimony which differed substantially from their prior written statements (the Select Committee eventually charged six of them with contempt of Congress), and union records were lost or destroyed (allegedly on purpose). In Oregon, The Oregonian newspaper ran a series of investigative pieces that earned reporters a Pulitzer Prize, and prosecutors indicted about 30 people. Working with the FBI, the Select Committee electrified the nation when on February 22, 1957, wiretaps were played in public before a national television audience in which Dio and Hoffa discussed the creation of even more paper locals, including the establishment of a paper local to organize New York City's 30,000 taxi cab drivers and use the charter as a means of extorting money from a wide variety of employers. The 1957 hearings opened with a focus on corruption in Portland, Oregon, and featured the testimony of Portland crime boss Jim Elkins. With the support of 70 hours of taped conversations, Elkins described being approached by two Seattle gangsters about working with the Teamsters to take over Portland vice operations. The colorful testimony brought the committee's investigations national media attention from the outset. As 1.2 million viewers watched on live television, evidence was unearthed over the next few weeks of a mob-sponsored plot in which Oregon Teamsters unions would seize control of the state legislature, state police, and state attorney general's office through bribery, extortion and blackmail. On March 14, 1957, Jimmy Hoffa was arrested for allegedly trying to bribe an aide to the Select Committee. Hoffa denied the charges (and was later acquitted), but the arrest triggered additional investigations and more arrests and indictments over the following weeks. Less than a week later, Beck admitted to receiving an interest-free $300,000 loan from the Teamsters which he had never repaid, and Select Committee investigators claimed that loans to Beck and other union officials (and their businesses) had cost the Teamsters more than $700,000. Beck appeared before the Select Committee for the first time on March 25, 1957, and notoriously invoked his Fifth Amendment right against self-incrimination 117 times. Beck was called before the McClellan Committee again in May 1957, and additional interest-free loans and other potentially illegal and unethical financial transactions exposed. Based on these revelations, Beck was indicted for tax evasion on May 2, 1957.

The Beck and Hoffa hearings generated strong criticisms of Robert Kennedy. Many liberal critics said he was a brow-beater, badgerer, insolent, overbearing, intolerant, and even vicious. Hoffa and other witnesses often were able to anger Kennedy to the point where he lost control, and would shout and insult them. Supreme Court Justice William O. Douglas, one of Robert Kennedy's mentors and a close friend, criticized Kennedy for presuming the guilt of anyone who exercised his Fifth Amendment rights. Noted attorney Edward Bennett Williams accused the Select Committee of bringing witnesses into executive session, ascertaining that they would exercise their Fifth Amendment rights, and then force them to return in public and refuse to answer questions—merely to generate media attention. The Chicago American newspaper so strongly criticized Robert Kennedy for his overbearing, zealous behavior during the hearings that a worried Joseph P. Kennedy Sr. rushed to Washington, D.C. to see for himself if Robert Kennedy was endangering John Kennedy's political future.

During much of the summer and fall of 1957, the Select Committee investigated corruption in the Bakery Workers Union, United Textile Workers, Amalgamated Meat Cutters Union, and Transport Workers Union. In the late fall, the committee focused its attention on union-busting, and examined the behavior of companies such as Morton Packing Company, Continental Baking Company, and Sears, Roebuck and Company.

While continuing to investigate and hold hearings on other unions and corporations, the McClellan Committee also began to examine the behavior of Jimmy Hoffa and other Teamsters officials. Senator McClellan accused Hoffa of attempting to gain control of the nation's economy and set himself up as a sort of private government. The Select Committee also accused Hoffa of instigating the creation of the paper locals, and of arranging for a $400,000 loan to the graft-ridden International Longshoremen's Association in a bid to take over that union and gain Teamsters control of the waterfront as well as warehouses. Johnny Dio, who by late summer 1957 was in prison serving time on bribery and conspiracy charges, was paroled by a federal court in order to testify at the Select Committee's hearings. But in a two-hour appearance before the Select Committee, Dio invoked his Fifth Amendment right against self-incrimination 140 times, and refused to answer any of the committee's questions. But despite the problems encountered in interrogating Dio, the Select Committee developed additional testimony and evidence alleging widespread corruption in Hoffa-controlled Teamster units was presented in public in August 1957. The worsening corruption scandal led the AFL-CIO to eject the Teamsters on December 6, 1957.

As the Hoffa hearings occurred in August 1957, the Select Committee met in executive session to restructure its organizations and set its agenda for the future. The Select Committee had succeeded in securing the removal of Beck as Teamsters president and seemed on the verge of sending Jimmy Hoffa to jail as well, but the committee had also been strongly criticized for its handling of witnesses and its apparent one-sidedness in exposing union but not management corruption. To guide the Select Committee's investigations in the future, McClellan established a set of eleven areas of investigation for the committee, nine of which involved labor misdeeds and only one of which involved management misbehavior (preventing workers from organizing unions). The management-oriented area came last on the committee's list of priorities, and there were no staff assigned to investigate the issue.

Under the new guidelines, the Select Committee's schedule of hearings slowed. In January 1958, Chairman McClellan asked for and received permission from the Senate to extend the deadline for completing the committee's work for another year. For a short time early in the year, the Select Committee investigated the International Union of Operating Engineers, and uncovered a limited financial scandal at the top of the union. But the main focus of the committee for the first half of the year was the United Auto Workers. Republicans on the Select Committee, notably Barry Goldwater, had for several months in late 1957 accused Robert Kennedy of covering up extensive corruption in the UAW. The Republicans pointed to a lengthy, ongoing, and sometimes violent strike which the UAW was conducting against the Kohler plumbing fixtures company in Wisconsin. Walter Reuther, president of the Auto Workers, told Select Committee investigators that the Kohler Company was committing numerous unfair labor practices against the union and that the union's books were in order. Despite no evidence of any mismanagement or organized crime infiltration, Kennedy and McClellan went ahead with hearings on the UAW in February 1958. The five-week series of hearings produced no evidence of corruption. A second set of hearings into the UAW in September 1959 lasted just six days, and once more uncovered no evidence of UAW malfeasance. The September 1959 hearings were the last public hearings the embarrassed committee ever held.

As the UAW hearings were winding down, the Select Committee issued its first Interim Report on March 24, 1958. The report roundly condemned Jimmy Hoffa (by now president of the Teamsters) and accused the Teamsters of gathering enough power to destroy the national economy. Refocusing its attention back on the Teamsters, the Select Committee held a short set of hearings in August 1958 intended to expose corruption by the Hoffa regime. But a number of witnesses recanted their written testimony and the hearings led nowhere.

In February 1959, the Select Committee's attention turned to an investigation of organized crime. McClellan had won yet another one-year extension of the Select Committee's existence in January, giving it additional time for more investigations. This new focus was a natural outgrowth of the committee's previous investigations, but it also reflected the committee's frustration at uncovering no additional scandals like the one which had rocked the Teamsters. Through much of the spring and summer of 1959, the committee held a series of public hearings which brought a number of organized crime figures to the public's attention, including Anthony Corrallo, Vito Genovese, Anthony Provenzano, Joey Glimco, Sam Giancana, and Carlos Marcello. Although more muted and less frequent, criticisms of the Select Committee and Robert Kennedy continued. Kennedy's moralism about labor racketeering, several high-profile critics concluded, even endangered the Constitution. Although McClellan wanted to further investigate organized crime, the Select Committee had reached the limits of its jurisdiction and no further investigations were made.

By September 1959, it was clear that the Select Committee was not developing additional information to justify continued operation. A second interim report was released in August 1959 once again denouncing the Teamsters and Jimmy Hoffa. Robert F. Kennedy resigned as the Select Committee's chief counsel on September 11, 1959, and joined Senator John F. Kennedy's presidential campaign as campaign manager. Committee members became more involved in passing legislation to deal with the abuses uncovered.

Although his committee had already been dissolved by 1960, McClellan began a related three-year investigation in 1963 into the union benefit plans of labor leader George Barasch, alleging misuse and diversion of $4,000,000 of benefit funds. McClellan's notable failure to find any legal wrongdoing led to his introduction of several pieces of new legislation including McClellan's own bill on October 12, 1965, setting new fiduciary standards for plan trustees. Senator Jacob K. Javits (R) of New York also introduced bills in 1965 and 1967 increasing regulation on welfare and pension funds to limit the control of plan trustees and administrators. Provisions from all three bills ultimately evolved into the guidelines enacted in the Employee Retirement Income Security Act of 1974 (ERISA).

== Disbandment and legislative and other outcomes ==
The final report of the Select Committee on Improper Activities in Labor and Management was issued on March 31, 1960. At that time, the authority granted by the Senate to the Select Committee was transferred to the Committee on Government Operations.

During its existence, the Select Committee conducted 253 active investigations, served 8,000 subpoenas for witnesses and documents, held 270 days of hearings with 1,526 witnesses (343 of whom invoked the Fifth Amendment), compiled almost 150,000 pages of testimony, and issued two interim and one final report. At its peak, 104 persons were engaged in the work of the committee, including 34 field investigators. Another 58 staffers were delegated to the committee by the Government Accounting Office and worked in Detroit, Chicago, New York City, and southern Florida. To accommodate the huge staff, a corridor was blocked off in the Old Senate Office Building and turned into a suite of offices.

Some observers continued to criticize the Select Committee. In 1961, Yale Law professor Alexander Bickel accused Kennedy of being punitive and battering witnesses, compared his tactics to those of Joseph McCarthy, and declared Kennedy unfit to be Attorney General. At the turn of the century, historians and biographers continued to criticize the Select Committee's lack of respect for the constitutional rights of witnesses brought before it.

=== Legislative and legal outcomes ===
Several historic legal developments came out of the select committee's investigation, including a U.S. Supreme Court decision and landmark labor legislation. The right of union officials to exercise their Fifth Amendment rights was upheld and a significant refinement of constitutional law made when the U.S. Supreme Court reaffirmed the right of union officials to not divulge the location of union records in Curcio v. United States, 354 U.S. 118 (1957).

The scandals uncovered by the Select Committee led directly to passage of the Labor-Management Reporting and Disclosure Act (also known as the Landrum-Griffin Act) in 1959. Calls for legislation and drafts of bills began circulating in the Senate as early as May 1957. Among the more prominent bills was one submitted in 1958 by Senators John F. Kennedy and Irving Ives (with assistance from nationally known labor law professor Archibald Cox) which covered 30 areas, including union recordkeeping, finances, and democratic organizational structures and rules. The Kennedy-Ives bill proved immensely controversial, leading to the longest Senate debate of the year, and the greatest number of amendments and floor votes any piece of legislation that year. But President Dwight D. Eisenhower opposed the bill and it died when the Congressional session ended in December 1958. Kennedy reintroduced the bill, with some additional provisions, in 1959. Although Ives had retired from the Senate, Senator Sam Ervin agreed to co-sponsor the revised bill. The Kennedy-Ervin bill also encountered stiff opposition, and Republicans were able to win Senate approval of a management "bill of rights" to the bill which labor strongly denounced. But with this and other Republican-backed amendments, the bill passed the Senate overwhelmingly.

By 1959 the Eisenhower administration had crafted its own bill, which was co-sponsored in the House of Representatives by Phillip M. Landrum (Democrat from Georgia) and Robert P. Griffin (Republican from Michigan). The Landrum-Griffin bill contained much stricter financial reporting and fiduciary restrictions than the Kennedy-Ervin bill as well as several unrelated provisions restricting union organizing, picketing, and boycott activity. A conference committee to reconcile the House and Senate bills began meeting on August 18, 1959. On September 3 and 4, the House and Senate passed the conference committee bill, which was far closer to the original Landrum-Griffin bill than the Kennedy-Ervin bill, and President Eisenhower signed the bill into law on September 14, 1959.

After the Select Committee's mandate expired, Senator McClellan and others advocated that the Senate expand the jurisdiction of one or more committees not only to provide oversight of the new labor law but also to continue the Senate's investigations into organized crime. McClellan originally sought jurisdiction for his own Committee on Government Operations, but members of his committee balked at the request. However, McClellan was able to convince the full Senate to impose jurisdiction on Government Operations, and the Permanent Subcommittee on Investigations began making inquiries into matters pertaining to syndicated or organized crime.

=== Impact on key participants ===
The national attention paid to Robert F. Kennedy during the Select Committee's hearings helped launch his career as a government official and politician. It also earned him a reputation for ruthlessness and hard work. His experiences with the Select Committee significantly affected Robert Kennedy, and strongly influenced his decision to make fighting organized crime a high priority during his tenure as United States Attorney General. After leaving the Select Committee, Robert F. Kennedy spent the better part of a year writing about his experiences and what he had learned about unions and organized crime. Kennedy's book, The Enemy Within, was published in February 1960.

The hearings also made Jimmy Hoffa a household name in the United States. The hearings were a critical turning point in Hoffa's career as a labor leader. Bringing down Dave Beck ensured that Hoffa would become president of the Teamsters, an outcome Robert Kennedy later regretted. Although Hoffa was indicted several times in federal and state courts based on evidence uncovered by the Select Committee, he was never convicted on any of the charges. Prosecutors and others accused Hoffa of jury tampering and suborning witnesses in order to beat conviction, but these charges also were never proven in a court of law. After he became U.S. Attorney General in January 1961, Robert F. Kennedy formed a "get Hoffa squad" whose mission was to identify additional evidence and secure a conviction against Hoffa. Kennedy's focus on Hoffa was so strong that many observers at the time as well as later historians believed Kennedy had a personal vendetta against Hoffa. Hoffa was eventually convicted by a federal district court jury on March 4, 1964, on two counts of tampering with the jury during his 1962 conspiracy trial in Nashville, Tennessee, and sentenced to eight years in prison and a $10,000 fine. While on bail during his appeal, a second federal district court jury convicted Hoffa on July 26, 1964, on one count of conspiracy and three counts of mail and wire fraud, and sentenced to five years in prison. Hoffa entered prison on March 7, 1967, and Frank Fitzsimmons was named Acting President of the union. Hoffa resigned as Teamsters president on June 19, 1971. Barred by a commutation of sentence agreement with President Richard Nixon, from participating directly or indirectly in union activities until March 6, 1980, Hoffa was released from prison on December 23, 1971, but disappeared on July 30, 1975 (and was presumably murdered).

The hearings had positive benefits for other key participants as well. The Kennedy-Ives bill was Senator John F. Kennedy's most important legislative accomplishment, and although it was not enacted into law many senators nonetheless revised their opinion and now saw him as a serious legislator. This helped remove a major obstacle to Kennedy's political aspirations. Kennedy also used the publicity he gained from the Select Committee's work to launch his own presidential bid in 1960. The work of the Select Committee also was a key turning point in the Senate career of John L. McClellan. McClellan devoted significant time and resources of the Permanent Subcommittee on Investigations (of which he was chair) to pushing anti-organized crime agenda in 1960s, and his efforts kept the issue alive despite the prominence of other issues such as the civil rights movement and Vietnam War. When limited jurisdiction over organized crime was transferred to the Committee on Government Operations after the disbandment of the Select Committee, Senator McClellan held a number of sensational hearings on organized crime from 1960 to 1964 which became known as the Valachi Hearings. In 1962, McClellan published his own account of the Select Committee's activities and findings in the book Crime Without Punishment. The senator sponsored several pieces of important anti-crime legislation in the 1960s and early 1970s, including the Omnibus Crime Control and Safe Streets Act of 1968 and the Organized Crime Control Act of 1970 (part of which contains the highly influential Racketeer Influenced and Corrupt Organizations Act).

== Members ==
=== 85th United States Congress ===
The Select Committee's chair was Senator John L. McClellan, and the vice chair was Senator Irving Ives. An equal number of Democrats and Republicans sat on the committee. Republican Senator Joseph McCarthy died on May 2, 1957, and was replaced by Republican Senator Homer E. Capehart. Democratic Senator Patrick McNamara resigned from the committee on March 31, 1958, to protest the Select Committee's rough treatment of union witnesses. He was replaced by Democratic Senator Frank Church.

Majority	Minority
John L. McClellan, Chair, Arkansas; John F. Kennedy, Massachusetts; Sam J. Ervin, Jr., North Carolina; Patrick V. McNamara, Michigan; Frank Church, Idaho	Irving Ives, Vice Chair, New York; Karl E. Mundt, South Dakota; Barry Goldwater, Arizona; Joseph McCarthy, Wisconsin; Carl T. Curtis, Nebraska

=== 86th United States Congress ===
The Select Committee's chair was Senator John L. McClellan. With the retirement of Senator Irving Ives from the Senate in December 1958, the new vice chair became Senator Karl E. Mundt. Senator Homer E. Capehart joined the committee to keep the partisan balance.

Majority	Minority
John L. McClellan, Chair, Arkansas; John F. Kennedy, Massachusetts; Sam J. Ervin, Jr., North Carolina; Frank Church, Idaho	Karl E. Mundt, Vice Chair, South Dakota; Barry Goldwater, Arizona; Carl T. Curtis, Nebraska; Homer E. Capehart, Indiana

=== Chairmen and staff ===
Senator John L. McClellan (D-Arkansas) was the committee's only chair for its entire history.

At the peak of its activity in 1958, 104 persons worked for the committee, including 34 field investigators. Another 58 staff were loaned to the committee from the General Accounting Office. Committee staff included:

- Robert F. Kennedy, Chief Counsel.
- Carmine Bellino, Chief Assistant to the Chief Counsel.
- Angela Novello, Personal Secretary to the Chief Counsel.
- Robert E. Manuel, Assistant Counsel.
- Walter Sheridan, Chief Investigator.
- Paul Tierney, investigator.
- LaVern J. Duffy, investigator.
- Richard G. Sinclair, investigator.
- James F. Mundie, investigator.
- John T. Thiede, investigator.
- Ruth Y. Watt, Chief Clerk.
- Kenneth O'Donnell, administrative assistant.
- Pierre Salinger, investigator.
- John Seigenthaler, investigator.
- Edwin Guthman, investigator.
