= 1980 in organized crime =

In 1980, a number of events took place in organized crime.

== Events ==
- January – Seven Rochester mobsters, including Frank D. Frassetto, are convicted in a federal court of racketeering crimes including several mob-related bombings.
- March 7 – Joseph Coppolino is stabbed to death and then decapitated, his headless corpse left on the street to be discovered by authorities. Coppolino was murdered by the DeMeo Crew, who suspected him of providing information about their marijuana trafficking operation to narcotics agents.

== Arts and literature ==
- Gloria (film) starring Gena Rowlands

== Deaths ==
- March 21 – Angelo Bruno "The Gentle Don"/"The Docile Don", Philadelphia crime family boss
- April 17 – Antonio Caponigro "Tony Bananas", Philadelphia crime family consigliere
- April 17 – Alfred Salerno, Chauffeur and cousin of Antonio Caponigro
- June 16 – Gerard Pappa, Colombo crime family associate and Genovese crime family soldier
- July 11 – Gabriel Mannarino "Kelly", LaRocca crime family caporegime
- September 19 – John Simone, Philadelphia crime family capo
- October 30 – Frank Sindone, Philadelphia Crime family capo
- December 16 – John McCullough, President of the Roofer's Union, Local 30 and an associate of Angelo Bruno
