= Edwin Helfant =

American judge

Edwin Howard Helfant (April 12, 1926 – February 15, 1978) was an American lawyer and part-time municipal judge in Atlantic County, New Jersey, who was accused of or investigated for corruption on several occasions. His 1978 gangland-style murder in Atlantic City was later tied to members of the Philadelphia crime family.

== Early life and legal career ==
Born in Scranton, Pennsylvania, Helfant graduated from Central High School in the early 1940s, and was drafted into the Air Corps Enlisted Reserve Corps in 1944, during World War II. He received a BA from Temple University in 1948, followed by a law degree from Rutgers Law School. By the early 1960s he was practicing law in New Jersey and had become a member of the New Jersey Bar Association. He served as a municipal court judge in Somers Point, New Jersey and later Galloway Township, New Jersey from 1960 to 1969 and again in 1972–1973.

As a municipal judge Helfant gained a reputation as a strict enforcer of local ordinances during the busy summer seasons at the Jersey Shore. He earned the nickname "the Fining Squire" for imposing fines on underage drinkers using false identification to enter bars. In addition to his judicial work, he maintained a private law practice with offices at the Guarantee Trust Building in Atlantic City, which he shared with Herman "Stumpy" Orman, a former Atlantic City rackets figure.

In 1970, after being removed from his Somers Point judgeship by Mayor George F. Roberts, Helfant represented plaintiffs in a civil suit alleging Roberts and several others were involved in forgery and conspiracy to defraud in a disputed property sale. At an April 1970 Atlantic City Council meeting he publicly accused Roberts with a conflict of interest over a proposed liquor license transfer for the bar "Your Father's Moustache", and urged the council to delay action until state authorities reviewed the matter. Roberts later alleged that the lawsuit was an attempt by Helfant to regain his municipal judgeship, a charge Helfant denied.

== Mob connections and murder ==
In 1973 a state grand jury indicted Helfant for allegedly accepting $700 of a promised $1,500 payoff from John Cantoni of Egg Harbor City to quash an assault and battery case dating back to 1968. Helfant fought the indictment for years, appealing unsuccessfully to the Supreme Court of the United States on grounds that the grand jury had coerced him into testifying against himself. His trial on obstruction of justice charges was repeatedly delayed and was underway in Trenton, New Jersey at the time of his death.

According to a 1987 indictment and New Jersey State Police testimony, in the early 1970s Helfant acted as an intermediary for a $12,500 bribe from Philadelphia–South Jersey mob figures Nicodemo "Little Nicky" Scarfo and Nicholas "Nick the Blade" Virgilio to secure a lenient sentence for Virgilio, then convicted of murdering a New Jersey bricklayer. The indictment alleged Helfant was supposed to pass the money to an unnamed Superior Court judge but "either could not or would not" return the bribe after Virgilio nevertheless received a 12- to 15-year sentence. Scarfo and Virgilio, enraged, allegedly demanded the money back after Virgilio's release on parole in 1976, but Helfant refused.

On February 15, 1978, Helfant was shot gangland style while sitting with his wife Marcie and business partner Leon Stricks in the cocktail lounge of the Flamingo Motel on Pacific Avenue in Atlantic City, of which he was part-owner. Witnesses said a man carrying a snow shovel, apparently posing as motel staff, approached their table shortly after 9 p.m. The man placed a hand on Stricks' shoulder to steady himself, and fired one shot into Helfant's head and three into his chest at close range. The gunman fled through a courtyard and escaped; the FBI and New Jersey State Police joined the investigation. Helfant died at age 50.

Helfant's name had also surfaced in the investigation of the July 1977 murder of Giuseppe "Pepe" Leva of Pomona, New Jersey, who was killed after a fight with Scarfo's nephew Philip Leonetti outside an Atlantic City bar. Helfant had intervened in that fight about a week before Leva was found shot to death in Egg Harbor Township. Leonetti was charged in Leva's murder, but the charges were later dropped after a witness recanted.

== Aftermath ==
Almost from the night of the shooting, investigators theorized Helfant's murder was a mob contract killing. In April 1987 a New Jersey grand jury indicted Scarfo and Virgilio for Helfant's murder, alleging Virgilio was the gunman and Scarfo the driver of the getaway car. In 1988 Scarfo, then the boss of the Philadelphia crime family, and sixteen co-defendants were convicted under the Racketeer Influenced and Corrupt Organizations Act of multiple crimes including the murder of Helfant. Virgilio was later sentenced to a 40-year prison term and died of a heart attack on March 15, 1995, at the United States Medical Center for Federal Prisoners in Springfield, Missouri, where he had been sent for treatment.

== Personal life ==
Helfant's engagement to Bella Rosen was announced in September 1948, and the couple were married on August 7, 1949. The couple had several sons, including Perry Helfant, who became an Ocean City defense attorney, and Richard Helfant, who later became entertainment coordinator for the Sands Hotel and Casino in Atlantic City.

At the time of his death, Helfant was married to Marcie Helfant.
