= 1979 in organized crime =

== Events ==
- James Eppolito, a member of the Gambino crime family, is photographed with First Lady Rosalynn Carter in recognition for his charity work in Manhattan.
- January 12 – Johnny Dioguardi dies at a Lewisburg, Pennsylvania hospital, while serving a sentence for stock fraud.
- January 17 – Anthony Scotto, a caporegime of the Gambino crime family and son-in-law to Anthony "Tough Tony" Anastasio, is indicted on charges of receiving $200,000 in illegal payoffs during his term in office as President of Brooklyn ILA Local 1814. As the General Organizer of the ILA, Scotto was one of the most influential labor leaders in New York at the time of his arrest.
- February 7 – Peter Waring, a cocaine dealer, is murdered, dismembered and disposed of by the DeMeo Crew. Waring was killed after agreeing to become an informant for agents with the NYPD's Narcotics Division.
- February 19 – Frederick Todaro is shot and stabbed to death by the DeMeo Crew. Todaro's body is then dismembered, packaged and disposed of at the Fountain Avenue Dump in Brooklyn.
- March 17 – Charles Padnick, William Serrano and two unidentified associates of Serrano are shot to death, dismembered and disposed of by the DeMeo Crew. They are murdered after travelling to New York to set up a large-scale cocaine deal with members of the crew.
- March 19 – James Padnick travels to New York after the disappearance of his father Charles Padnick and is murdered, dismembered and disposed of by the DeMeo Crew.
- April 14 – Giovanni "Papa John" Priziola, a former consiglieri of the Detroit crime syndicate, dies of natural causes at the age of 84.
- April 19 – Dominick Ragucci, a 19-year-old college student with no organized crime ties, is shot to death by Roy DeMeo after a high-speed car chase. Ragucci was murdered after DeMeo mistakenly identified him as a hitman sent by a Cuban drug cartel.
- April 26 – Anthony "Little Pussy" Russo, a high-ranking member of the Genovese crime family who had risen from a chauffeur and bodyguard for Vito Genovese to become a Genovese capo in Monmouth County, New Jersey, is found shot to death in Long Branch, New Jersey. Russo's death may have been connected to an FBI surveillance operation in which he unknowingly revealed details of concealing Las Vegas casino ownership and skimming operations.
- May 11 – Gambino associate and DeMeo Crew member Harvey 'Chris' Rosenberg is murdered by Roy DeMeo and Anthony Senter on orders from DeMeo's superior Anthony Gaggi for ripping off and killing associates of a Colombian drug dealer.
- June 22 – Guam Drug trafficker Francisco S. Palacios and his wife are arrested on drugs charges.
- July 11 – Giorgio Ambrosoli, the attorney investigating the bankruptcy of the financial empire of Sicilian banker Michele Sindona, is murdered in Milan on the orders of Sindona.
- July 11 – Anthony Provenzano, who had been extorting payments from trucking firms at the threat of instigating union strikes, is convicted of labor racketeering and sentenced to 20 years in federal prison.
- July 12 – Carmine "Lilo" Galante, boss of the Bonanno crime family, is gunned down with capo Leonardo "Nardo" Coppola and his cousin, soldier Giuseppe Turano while having dinner at Joe & Mary's Italian Restaurant on Knickerbocker Ave., Brooklyn. Bonanno soldier Angelo "Little Moe" Presenzano escaped being killed by leaving early due to a stomach ache. Galante's bodyguards, "Zips" Cesare Bonventre and Baldo Amato took part in the hit (Bonventre shot Galante and Amato was back-up). The primary shooters were Russell Mauro (shot Galante), Bruno Indelicato (shot Turano and Coppola), Dominick "Big Trin" Trinchera (stood guard inside restaurant), Santo Giordano (stood guard outside and drove). Joe Massino, Sonny Red Indelicato, J.B. Indelicato and Phil Lucky Giacone were outside in a car as back-up. They all made up the Family Factions who opposed the monopoly (Galante had created in the heroin business) and they feared his tyrannical rule. The Factions who wished to rid themselves of Galante was the Rastelli-Massino-Napolitano Faction, the Indelicato-Giacone-Trinchera Faction and the "Zips" Catalano-Ganci-Bonventre-Amato Faction who all wanted to kill Galante whom they feared. Galante rival boss Rusty Rastelli was given Commission approval.
- Nicholas "Nicky Glasses" Marangello and Michael "Mimi" Sabella, Bonanno family underboss and capo based out of "The Toyland Social Club" in Little Italy, Manhattan were contracted to be hit with Carmine Galante, but were demoted to soldiers because they were well liked by Family members. After Galante's murder "Zips" capo Salvatore Catalano was made underboss-street boss and Cesare Bonventre was made capo (youngest in Cosa Nostra). Dominick "Sonny Black" Napolitano, Joseph "Big Joe" Massino and Anthony "Bruno" Indelicato made capos.
- July 13 – Former Guam police officer and drug trafficker Felix M. Garrido and his live-in girlfriend, Dora Scharff Garrido are shot dead by an unknown assailant at their Dededo home.
- July 14 – Dora Scharff Garrido's father, retired police detective George Scharff, vows to find his daughter and son-in-law's murderer.
- July 17 – Guam police assign officers to guard George Scharff's home.
- July 20 – Convicted drug trafficker Francisco S. Palacios is connected to the murder of Felix M. Garrido and Dora Scharff Garrido. They had provided the government with information leading to the arrest of Palacios and his wife on June 22.
- July 21 – Boris Giuliano, deputy police chief of Palermo, who is investigating heroin trafficking between Sicily and the United States is killed near his home in Palermo on the orders of the Sicilian Mafia Commission. One of the killers is Leoluca Bagarella of the Corleonesi.
- August 2 – Michele Sindona disappears from New York, where he is under indictment, staging a bogus kidnapping with the aid of John Gambino. After spending several weeks in Sicily in the care of Sicilian mafiosi Rosario Spatola, Salvatore Inzerillo and Stefano Bontade, Sindona laundered the proceeds of heroin trafficking for the Bontade-Spatola-Inzerillo-Gambino network. The real purpose of the "kidnapping" was to issue sparsely disguised blackmail notes to Sindona's past political allies – among them Prime Minister Giulio Andreotti – to engineer the rescue of his banks and recuperate Cosa Nostra's money. The plot failed and after his "release" Sindona surrendered to the FBI, after reappearing in New York on October 16.
- August 19 – Guam police announce that four key suspects in the Garrido double-murder had left the country for California.
- August 28 – Convicted drug trafficker Johnny B. Santos claims that fellow Guam Penitentiary inmate Irvin R. Ibanez admitted to the double-murder on the orders of Palacios. Ibanez denies the allegations and the case goes cold.
- September 25 – Sicilian, Mafia prosecutor Cesare Terranova is shot dead. Terranova was the prosecutor responsible for the imprisonment of Luciano Leggio serving a life sentence for the murder of Michele Navarra. Imprisoned mobster, Luciano Leggio is brought to trial but is acquitted due to lack of evidence. Terranova was preparing to return as head of the investigative department of the prosecution office of Palermo, after serving on the Antimafia Commission of the Italian parliament.
- October 1 – Gambino members James Eppolito and James Eppolito, Jr. are shot to death by fellow Gambino Family members Anthony Gaggi and Roy DeMeo. The murder is witnessed by a civilian who alerts a nearby police officer. A gunfight erupts between the officer and Gaggi, who is wounded in the neck and arrested. DeMeo, who split up with Gaggi upon leaving the crime scene, is never identified or apprehended. The Eppolitos were related to 'Mafia Cop' Louis Eppolito.
- October 12 – Legitimate used car dealers Ronald Falcaro and Khaled Daoud are shot to death, dismembered and disposed of by the DeMeo Crew. They are murdered after Daoud threatened to provide law enforcement with information pertaining to an international auto-theft ring being operated by the crew.
- November 9 – John Paul Spica, associate of Anthony Giodano and a suspect in the 1968 assassination of Martin Luther King Jr., is killed by a car bomb in his Cadillac.
- November 15 Detroit mobsters Raffaele Quasarano and Peter Vitale, members of a commission controlling the Detroit crime syndicate, are indicted under the Racketeer Influenced and Corrupt Organizations Act (RICO) on charges including racketeering, extortion, mail and tax fraud.

== Births ==
- January 3 – Giovanni Strangio, Mafia soldier to the Italian 'Ndrangheta

== Deaths ==
- Cesare Terranova, Sicilian prosecutor
- January 12 – Johnny Dioguardi (Johnny Dio), Lucchese crime family member and labor racketeer
- April – James Torello "Turk", Chicago Outfit member
- May 11 – Harvey 'Chris' Rosenberg, Gambino crime family associate and member of the DeMeo Crew
- July 12 – Carmine Galante "Lilo"/"The Cigar", Bonanno crime family boss
