= 1971 in organized crime =

== Events ==
- Luciano Leggio is once again captured and brought to trial by prosecutor Cesare Terranova, only this time on 9 counts of murder. Leggio is once again acquitted of all charges.
- Joseph "Mad Dog" Sullivan becomes the first man to escape from the Attica Correctional Facility in upstate New York, before his capture only five weeks later in Greenwich Village.
- Donato "Danny the Head" Fatico, brother of Gambino crime family Capo Carmine "Wagon Wheels" Fatico and an early sponsor of future Gambino leader John Gotti, is convicted of hijacking charges.
- March 16 – Gambino crime family captain Angelo Mele and 4 associates were convicted for conspiracy to sell 2 kilos of heroin. Mele was sentenced to 30 years in prison.
- March 28 - Killeen enforcer Billy O'Sullivan is killed near his Savin Hill home by Mullin member Paulie McGonagle. O'Sullivan had previously killed his twin brother Donnie, who had mistaken him for his brother.
- May 12 – Bonanno crime family boss Paul Sciacca and captain Michael Casale were arrested for conspiring to sell heroin to an undercover agent during "Operation Flanker", which netted various New York mafiosi for narcotics infractions, but eventually all defendants went free as all charges were dropped for various reasons. Sciacca was not imprisoned, but like his predecessor Gaspar DiGregorio, Sciacca was replaced by the Commission, who promoted underboss Natale Evola as the new boss.
- June 28 – Joe Colombo is seriously wounded by gunman Jerome Johnson during Italian-American Unity Day, ending his involvement in the Italian-American Civil Rights League. Although surviving the attempt on his life, Colombo would remain comatose until his death in 1978. Initially suspected to have been ordered by rival mobster Joe Gallo, later evidence would indicate the involvement of former Colombo ally Carlo Gambino for the attempted assassination. Colombo Capo Thomas DiBello negotiates a truce with the Gallo Brothers soon after the shooting, ending the long running Gallo-Colombo gang war.
- July –
  - A gang war begins in Boston's underworld between the Killeens and the Mullen gang after Mickey Dwyer's nose is bitten off and then shot three times by Kenneth Killeen, during an altercation at the Transit, a local Southie bar.
  - Several weeks following the Transit incident, Kileen enforcers Billy O'Sullivan and Whitey Bulger encounter Dennis "Buddy" Roache a member of the Mullins and brother of future Boston Police Commissioner Francis "Mickey" Roache in a Broadway bar. After a heated argument, Roache is shot and was paralyzed for the remainder of his life.
- September 17 – Lucchese crime family captain James Plumeri was found strangled to death less than 6 months after his conviction on charges of violating the Welfare and Pension Plans Disclosure Act.
- September 25 – Chicago Outfit executioner Felix "Milwaukee Phil" Alderisio died of natural causes while serving a term for extortion in the United States Penitentiary at Marion, Illinois.
- October 12 – Gambino crime family soldier Alexander D'Alessio, who was identified by Joseph Valachi as a man who controls gambling on Staten Island for Carlo Gambino, was arrested in a raid of gambling establishments by FBI Agents.
- October 23 – Meyer Lansky is indicted by a federal grand jury of skimming money from the syndicate casino, the Flamingo Hotel, charging that Lansky and three others planned to conceal and distribute over $36 million in unreported income.
- November 9 – Milwaukee mob boss Frank Balistrieri (already imprisoned on other charges) and five associates are slapped with a 10-count federal indictment for concealing the ownership of a restaurant, income tax fraud and other charges.
- November 26 – Joe Adonis, a former captain under Frank Costello, dies of natural causes in Italy.
- December 24 – New York mobster Bruno Latini is shot and killed in his car by Richard Kuklinski.

== Arts and literature ==
- Equal Danger (novel) by Leonardo Sciascia.
- The Gang That Couldn't Shoot Straight (film), starring Jerry Orbach and Robert De Niro.
- Shaft (film), starring Richard Roundtree and Moses Gunn.
- The French Connection (film), starring Gene Hackman.
- Get Carter (film), starring Michael Caine.

== Births ==
- Salvatore Montagna "The Iron Worker", Bonanno crime family street boss for Vincent Basciano

== Deaths ==
- April 3 – Former Genovese crime family buttonman and government informant Joseph Valachi died of natural causes while imprisoned at the La Tuna Federal Penitentiary in El Paso, Texas.
- September 25 – Felix Alderisio, Chicago Outfit Boss
- November 26 – Joe Adonis Joseph Doto, New York mobster and captain under Frank Costello, died of natural causes in Italy.
- December 25 – Bruno Latini, New York mobster
