= 1976 in organized crime =

In 1976, a number of events took place in organized crime.

== Events ==
- John Riggi succeeds Sam DeCavalcante as boss of the New Jersey crime family.
- February 12 – Joseph "The Animal" Barboza, an enforcer for the Patriarca crime family, is beaten to death in San Francisco, California. Barboza, who had been imprisoned for murder, had agreed to become a government informant and had entered the Federal Witness Protection Program after testifying against Raymond L.S. Patriarca.
- February 20 – A plea by Carmine Persico, boss of the Colombo Family, for reduction of his 14-year sentence for hijacking is denied.
- March 19 – Lawrence Paladino, the godson of Frank "Funzie" Tieri, is indicted for tax evasion. Paladino, who allegedly was in the shylock business with Matthew Ianniello, had been indicted for extortion and bribery in 1975. With the death of Tieri, who would be succeeded by Anthony Salerno, Ianniello would become the underboss of the Genovese Family.
- April 23 – Bonanno crime family boss Philip Rastelli is convicted of an antitrust violation and extortion, arising out of his efforts to create a monopoly in the mobile commissary business. Rastelli is sentenced on August 27, 1976, to 1 year on the antitrust count and to 3 concurrent 10-year terms on 3 counts of extortion.
- May – Joe "Mad Dog" Sullivan, after serving 10 years for second degree manslaughter, is unexpectedly given a parole from the state of New York and released from prison. He is soon hired by "Fat" Tony Salerno, head of the Genovese crime family, to systematically eliminate high ranking associates of Mickey Spillane's Hell's Kitchen organization, specifically Tom Delaney and Eddie "the Butcher" Cummiskey.
- May 20 – Lucchese crime family soldier Joseph Brocchini is shot to death by the Gambino-affiliated DeMeo Crew in an unsanctioned murder.
- May 28 – Frank Diecidue, the Tampa Family underboss, is indicted with several associates and charged with conspiracy and multiple counts relating to their participation in a RICO. Diecidue would be convicted on November 16, 1976, along with 4 members of the Tampa gang.
- June 12 – Vincent Governara is gunned down in Brooklyn by Gambino soldier Anthony Gaggi and Gambino associate Roy DeMeo. The murder was retaliation for a physical altercation between Gaggi and Governara years earlier. Governara would succumb to his wounds the following week while hospitalized.
- July 13 – Florida resident George Byrum is found shot and stabbed to death in the bathroom of an oceanside motel. His murder would remain unsolved until the early 1980s, when information supplied by Gambino associate Dominick Montiglio revealed that Byrum had been murdered by Gambino soldier Anthony Gaggi and Gambino associate Roy DeMeo for providing a tip to thieves that led to Gaggi's Florida home being robbed.
- August 20 – Edward Cummiskey is shot to death at the Sunbrite Saloon. Recently paroled Irish criminal Joseph 'Mad Dog' Sullivan would be suspected in the crime after the saloon's barkeep identified Sullivan as the shooter from a photograph shown to him by associates of Cummiskey. Sullivan is never charged with the crime and the murder remains officially unsolved.
- August 22 – Leo "The Lips" Moceri, underboss of the Cleveland crime family, and cousin of boss James "Blackie" Licavoli, is murdered by the John Nardi-Danny Green alliance trying to take over the Cleveland rackets from Licavoli and his associates. A war that will eventually decimate the Cleveland La Cosa Nostra has started with the opening volley of Leo Moceri's disappearance.
- September 5 – John Cutrone, a Gallo loyalist who defected after the death of Joe Gallo and formed an independent gang, is machinegunned to death in a luncheonette in Brooklyn, New York.
- October 15 – Carlo Gambino, founder of the Gambino crime family, dies of a heart attack. Following his death, Paul Castellano assumes leadership of the criminal organization upsetting members that favored longtime underboss Aniello Dellacroce such as John Gotti and the so-called "Blue Collar" faction of the crime family. Despite the support displayed by the Gotti faction, Dellacroce is able to convince them to remain loyal to Castellano. However, anger for the aging mobster being passed over for leadership and resentment towards the increasingly unpopular Castellano continues for several years.
- November 4 – Bonanno crime family capo Pietro Licata is murdered, allegedly on orders from Sal Catalano. Licata, who oversaw criminal activities in the Brooklyn neighborhood of Knickerbocker Avenue, was one of the few members running crime family operations opposed against the "Zips", a faction of Sicilian mafiosi within the Bonanno family dealing heroin and taking over gambling operations in the Knickerbocker Ave., Brooklyn area.
- December 15 – Undercover FBI Agent Walter Wayne Orrell is threatened and punched by a Bronx, New York carting company owner named Joseph Gambino and his right-hand-man Carlo Conti. Gambino was described as a cousin of Don Carlo Gambino. The FBI Agent was part of a Sting operation designed to combat the monopolistic control the New York LCN had on the carting industry.

== Arts and literature ==
- Bugsy Malone (film) starring Scott Baio and Jodie Foster.
- Cadaveri eccellenti (film) starring Lino Ventura.
- The Death Collector (film) starring Joe Pesci and Frank Vincent.

== Deaths ==
- February 11 – Joseph Barboza, Patriarca crime family enforcer (43)
- May 20 – Joseph Brocchini, Lucchese crime family soldier (43)
- July 29 – Mickey Cohen, Crime boss (62)
- August 20 – Edward Cummiskey, New York gangster (32)
- August 22 – Leo "The Lips" Moceri, Cleveland crime family underboss (76)
- October 15 – Carlo Gambino, boss of the Gambino crime family (74)
- November 4 – Pietro Licata, Bonanno crime family capo of Knickerbocker Ave., Brooklyn (70)
