= 1961 in organized crime =

== Events ==
- October 8 – Albert Agueci, French Connection heroin smuggler for the Buffalo crime family, is severely tortured and murdered. He threatened to inform on crime boss Stefano Magaddino because Magaddino did not provide bail money and assistance to his family. When his remains were found in a field near Rochester, N.Y. on November 23, he was naked, his hands were bound behind his back, his front teeth were knocked out and 30 lbs. of flesh were cut from his body, all while he was alive, a clear message from Don Stefano. His death would cause his brother Vito Agueci to label Albert's friend and heroin customer Joe Valachi a government informant. Vito Aguecci's rumors are what prompted Vito Genovese to put a contract on Valachi and Valachi agreeing to become a government informant and be the first Cosa Nostra Rat. He testified in the 1963 Senate Hearings.
- May 4 – A federal investigation reveals decades long corruption as a grand jury finds evidence of Kansas City, Missouri police officials cooperating with organized crime figures allowing criminal activity.
- June 20 – After serving nearly a year on Rikers Island, Frank Costello is released from prison and retires to his gambling and legitimate business interests.
- October 31 – Bernard McLaughlin, leader of the Charlestown Mob, is killed. Members of the Winter Hill Gang were deemed responsible, however other sources claim gunman of the Patriarca crime family responsible. McLaughlin was an early victim of the Boston Irish Mob Wars which would continue throughout the decade.
- November – Albert Testa, a counterfeiter and burglar as well as an associate of tortured and murdered Chicago Outfit member William "Action" Jackson, is murdered.

== Arts and literature ==
- The Day of the Owl (novel) by Leonardo Sciascia
- Hoodlum Priest (film)

== Births ==
- Richard Martino, Gambino crime family associate

== Deaths ==
- November – Albert Testa, Chicago criminal involved in counterfeiting, burglary and an associate of Chicago Outfit member William "Action" Jackson
- November 23 – Albert Agueci, drug trafficker and Genovese crime family member
