= 1977 in organized crime =

Events concerning organized crime from the year 1977.

== Events ==
- Pittston-based Bufalino crime family leader Russell Bufalino, one of the three dominant organized crime syndicates operating in Pennsylvania, is arrested and later imprisoned in Danbury Federal Prison.
- February 2 – New York businessman Arthur Milgram, owner of a lottery ticket distribution service, is killed by New York mobsters.
- April 1 – Thomas J. Palermo, a government informant, is found murdered.
- May 5 – Charles "Ruby" Stein, a New York loanshark and associate of Anthony "Fat Tony" Salerno, is lured to the 596 Club by Jimmy Coonan with members of the Westies and the Gambino crime family and murdered.
- May 13 – While walking down 59th Street in Woodside, a middle-class neighborhood in Queens, Mickey Spillane is shot and killed by an unknown gunman after approaching an unmarked car. Although in semiretirement, Spillane's death would mark the official end of the decade long gang war between Spillane and Jimmy Coonan as power over Hell's Kitchen falls to the Westies.
- July 15 – Australian anti-drug campaigner Donald Mackay is kidnapped from a hotel carpark. Used shotgun shells and blood stains are found in his locked van. Drug baron Robert Trimbole is suspected of ordering the murder.
- October 6 – Cleveland gangster Danny "The Irishman" Greene is killed by a car bomb after leaving from a dentist's appointment.
- October 30 – Frank Lino is made, or officially inducted, into the Bonanno Family. Lino would eventually become a cooperating witness for the government in 2003.

== Births ==
- Giuseppe Riina, Sicilian mafioso and son of mafia boss Salvatore Riina.

== Deaths ==
- February 2 – Arthur Milgram, New York businessman
- April 1 – Thomas J. Palermo, New York mobster and government informant
- May 13 – Mickey Spillane, New York mobster
- July 15 – Donald Mackay, Australian anti-drug campaigner
- October 6 – Danny Greene, Cleveland gangster
