= 1974 in organized crime =

In 1974, a number of events took place in organized crime.

== Events ==
- Luciano Leggio is brought to court a third time by prosecutor Cesare Terranova. This time for the murder of Michele Navarra, a crime Leggio had committed 16 years earlier. Leggio is found guilty and sentenced to life imprisonment. Leggio officially remains caporegime of the Corleonesi Clan, but delegates authority to his pre-consuls on the Cupola Bernardo "The Tractor" Provenzano and Salvatore Riina.
- January 23 – Colombo crime family consigliere Alphonse Persico was sentenced to 2 months for contempt (although granted immunity, he refused to testify in a grand jury investigation of racketeering influence in legitimate business).
- January 24 – Former Bonanno crime family underboss Carmine Galante was released from prison after serving 12 years on Federal narcotics charges and returned to New York City with avowed intention of gaining control of the Bonanno Family.
- July 19 – Stefano Magaddino, in control of criminal operations in the Buffalo and the Eastern Ohio area for several decades, dies of a heart attack. Salvatore "Samuel Johns" Pieri becomes new Boss.
- October 9 – A body, believed to be that of Dominick Scialo, a Colombo Family caporegime, was discovered buried in the basement of a South Brooklyn social club. There was suspicion that Carlo Gambino ordered the slaying after Scialo disrespected Gambino in a Coney Island, Brooklyn restaurant.

== Arts and literature ==
- Crazy Joe (film) starring Peter Boyle.
- The Godfather Part II (film) starring Al Pacino, Robert De Niro, Robert Duvall, Diane Keaton, John Cazale and Talia Shire.
- Lucky Luciano (film) starring Gian Maria Volonté and Vincent Gardenia.

== Deaths ==
- January 14 – Joseph Dippolito, Underboss of the Los Angeles crime family
- July 19 – Stefano Magaddino "The Undertaker", New York mobster
- October 19 – Nick Licata, Boss of the Los Angeles crime family
