= 1967 in organized crime =

In 1967, a number of events took place in organized crime.

== Events ==
- March – Federal authorities, helped by government informant Harold Konigsberg, discover a Mafia "graveyard" in New Jersey.
- March 16 – Chicago businessman Alan Rosenburg, owing a substantial amount of money to Felix Alderisio, is beaten to death by members of the Chicago Outfit.
- March 22 – Milwaukee mob boss Frank Balistrieri is convicted of two counts of tax evasion by a federal jury in Illinois.
- April 7 – Henry Hill and Thomas DeSimone burglarize Kennedy Airport's Air France shipment of $420,000.
- May – Joseph Bonanno is accused by federal authorities of running an international drug trafficking operation between Montreal, Quebec, and New York City, New York.
- June – Genovese and Gambino crime families are charged by federal authorities to hold a monopoly on Westchester County garbage carting and waste disposal.
- June 23 – Two hitmen kill the French-Corsican mob boss Antoine Guerini close to Marseille, in France.
- July 13 – Thomas Lucchese, after being hospitalized on and off since August 1965, dies of natural causes at his Lido Beach, home in Long Island, New York. Carmine "Mr. Gribbs" Tramunti was chosen at the "La Stella-Little Apalachin" meeting on September 22, 1966, as acting boss of the Lucchese crime family.
- November 10 – Frank "Frankie 500" Telleri is murdered along with Thomas (Smitty) and James D'Angelo at the Cypress Garden Restaurant in Queens shortly after defecting from the Bonanno crime family to the rival Gasperino DiGregorio faction. Johnny Dio is convicted of bankruptcy fraud and is sentenced to five years imprisonment and a $10,000 fine.
- November 17 – Vincent Rao, consigliere of the Lucchese crime family, is convicted of perjury and sentenced to five years in federal prison.
- August 1 – Charles Grandiere convicted of theft at a local fruit stand on the streets of New York City. Sentenced to ten years for theft and attempted murder of the store owner. Eventually sent to Guantanamo Bay.

== Arts and literature ==
- Le Samouraï (film) starring Alain Delon
- Point Blank (film) starring Lee Marvin and Angie Dickinson.
- The St. Valentine's Day Massacre (film) starring Jason Robards, George Segal, Ralph Meeker, Clint Ritchie and Harold J. Stone.

== Deaths ==
- March 16 – Alan Rosenberg, Chicago businessman associated with the Chicago Outfit
- October 29 – Jack McVitie "The Hat", is murdered by Reggie Kray
- November 10 – Thomas D' Angelo, Bonanno crime family member
- November 10 – James D' Angelo, Bonanno crime family member
- November 10 – Frank Telleri "The 500", Bonanno crime family member
- June 23 – Antoine Guerini French/Corsican mob boss.
- July 13 – Thomas Lucchese "Three Finger Brown", New York mobster and founder of the Lucchese crime family
