= 1978 in organized crime =

In 1978, a number of events took place in organized crime.

== Events ==
- Paul Castellano forms a working partnership between the Gambino crime family and the Westies street gang of Manhattan's Hell's Kitchen.
- January 6 – Cleveland Crime Family boss James Licavoli, underboss Angelo Lonardo, John Calandra, Ronald Carabbia, Pasquale Cisterino, Thomas Sinito, Alfred Calabrese, and Los Angeles crime family capo Jimmy "The Weasel" Fratianno are indicted after a grand jury investigation regarding the 1977 bombing deaths of John Nardi and Danny Greene.
- February 15 – Edwin Helfant, a lawyer and part-time municipal Judge, is killed for allegedly failing to rig a trial in Atlantic City, by the Philadelphia mafia.
- February 17 – John (Johnny) Green killed as he opened his garage doors upon returning home.
- February 28 – Dominic Brooklier, underboss Samuel Sciortino, consigliere Jack LoCicero, capo Louis Tom Dragna are indicted under the RICO Act on charges including extortion, and obstruction of a criminal investigation.
- March 7 – Salvatore 'Ciaschiteddu' Greco, the first "secretary" of the Sicilian Mafia Commission, dies in Caracas (Venezuela) from cirrhosis of the liver.
- March 21 – Salvatore Briguglio, a Teamsters Union official involved in Provenzano's New Jersey chapter, is gunned down in New York's Little Italy while at the Andrea Doria Social Club. Briguglio had been scheduled to appear with Anthony Provenzano and Harold Konigsberg in court for the 1961 murder of Anthony Castellito.
- April 8 – Sicilian Mafia boss Francesco Madonia murdered on the instigation of Giuseppe Di Cristina and Gaetano Badalamenti.
- April 23 – Rochester mobster Salvatore "Sammy G" Gingello is killed by a car bomb planted by rival mobsters.
- May 1 – Joseph Napolitan, a member of the Patriarca crime family, is convicted of conspiring to distribute $3.3 million in counterfeit $100 bills. On September 6, Napolitan and an associate were found murdered in New York, possibly on the basis that Napolitan claimed to have been an FBI informant in his defence.
- May 16 – Lucchese associate Michael DiCarlo is shot, stabbed and ultimately beaten to death by the Gambino-affiliated DeMeo Crew. DiCarlo's body is then dismembered and disposed of and to date has not been found. It is the first known contract hit carried out by the DeMeo Crew, who were alleged to have been paid $5,000 for the job by DiCarlo's capo in the Lucchese Family.
- May 30 – Sicilian Mafia boss Giuseppe Di Cristina murdered by the Corleonesi while waiting at a bus stop.
- June 12 – On probation since their conviction of extortion in 1972, brothers Salvatore Bonanno and Joseph Bonanno, Jr.'s paroles are revoked for withholding information regarding unreported income and are both sentenced to 30 months and 34 months.
- June 15 – Genovese caporegime and Secretary-Treasurer of Teamsters Local 560, Anthony Provenzano, is convicted with enforcer Harold "Kayo" Konigsberg by a grand jury in Kingston, New York as an accessory for the 1961 murder of Teamsters Union rival Anthony Castellito and, on June 21, sentenced from 25 years' to life imprisonment.
- June 16 – Kansas City mobsters William and Joseph Cammisano are indicted for "conspiracy to extort the property of Fred Bonadonna." Bonadonna, a local River Quay-area bar owner, had opposed plans by Joseph Cammisano to open establishments featuring adult entertainment during the mid-1970s which eventually resulted in the 1976 murder of his father (and former associate of William Cammisano) David Bonadonna. On October 23, the Cammisanos agreed to plea bargains and, on November 22, William and Joseph were sentenced to 5 years' and 18 months' imprisonment, respectively.
- June 28 – After several years in a coma following a failed assassination attempt on his life in 1971, Joe Colombo dies in his home.
- August 5 – Anthony Milano, longtime underboss of the Cleveland syndicate, dies of natural causes at the age of 90.
- August 8 – Russell Bufalino, leader of the Pittston-based Bufalino crime family, is convicted of extortion by a U.S. District Court.
- August 25 – Associate members Thomas Lanai and Kenneth Ciarcia are found guilty of aggravated murder charges in the death of Greene.
- September 30 – Sicilian Mafia boss Giuseppe Calderone murdered by Nitto Santapaola and the Corleonesi.
- Gaetano "Tano" Badalamenti is posato (expelled) from the Sicilian Mafia by the rising powerhouses in the Cupola, Totò Riina and Bernardo Provenzano. Badalamenti is to be killed on sight by any Cosa Nostra member and flees Sicily fearing for his life. Anyone associated to Badalamenti is to sever all ties, on pain of death. Michele Greco, capo of the Ciaculli clan, succeeds Badalamenti as head (chairman) of the Cupola. Greco is subservient to the Corleonesi of Totò Riina.
- October 5 – Michael Volpe, longtime housekeeper and associate of Anthony Accardo, is reported missing and later presumed murdered. Volpe, like Accardo, had previously appeared before a grand jury investigating the torture and murder of several criminals suspected to have broken into the home of the Chicago Outfit leader.
- November 20 – Salvatore Pieri, boss of the Buffalo crime family, pleads guilty to illegal gambling charges.

== Arts and literature ==
- The Hoffa Wars: Teamsters, rebels, politicians and the mob by Dan E. Moldea is published.
- Norman Jewison's F.I.S.T., loosely based on Teamsters President Jimmy Hoffa, starring Sylvester Stallone, Rod Steiger and Peter Boyle and Melinda Dillon is released.
- Fingers, featuring the debut of writer director James Toback and starring Harvey Keitel, is released.

== Deaths ==
- January 22 – Paolo Violi was shot in the head at close range with a lupara in the Bar Jean-Talon in Montreal
- February 15 – Edwin Helfant, lawyer and part-time municipal Judge
- April 23 – Salvatore Gingello "Sammy G", Rochester "A Team" mobster
- March 7 – Salvatore 'Ciaschiteddu' Greco, Sicilian mafioso and head of the Ciaculli crime family.
- March 21 – Salvatore Briguglio, Teamsters Union official and associate of Anthony Provenzano
- May 16 – Michael DiCarlo, Lucchese Family associate
- June 28 – Joe Colombo – New York mobster
