= 1963 in organized crime =

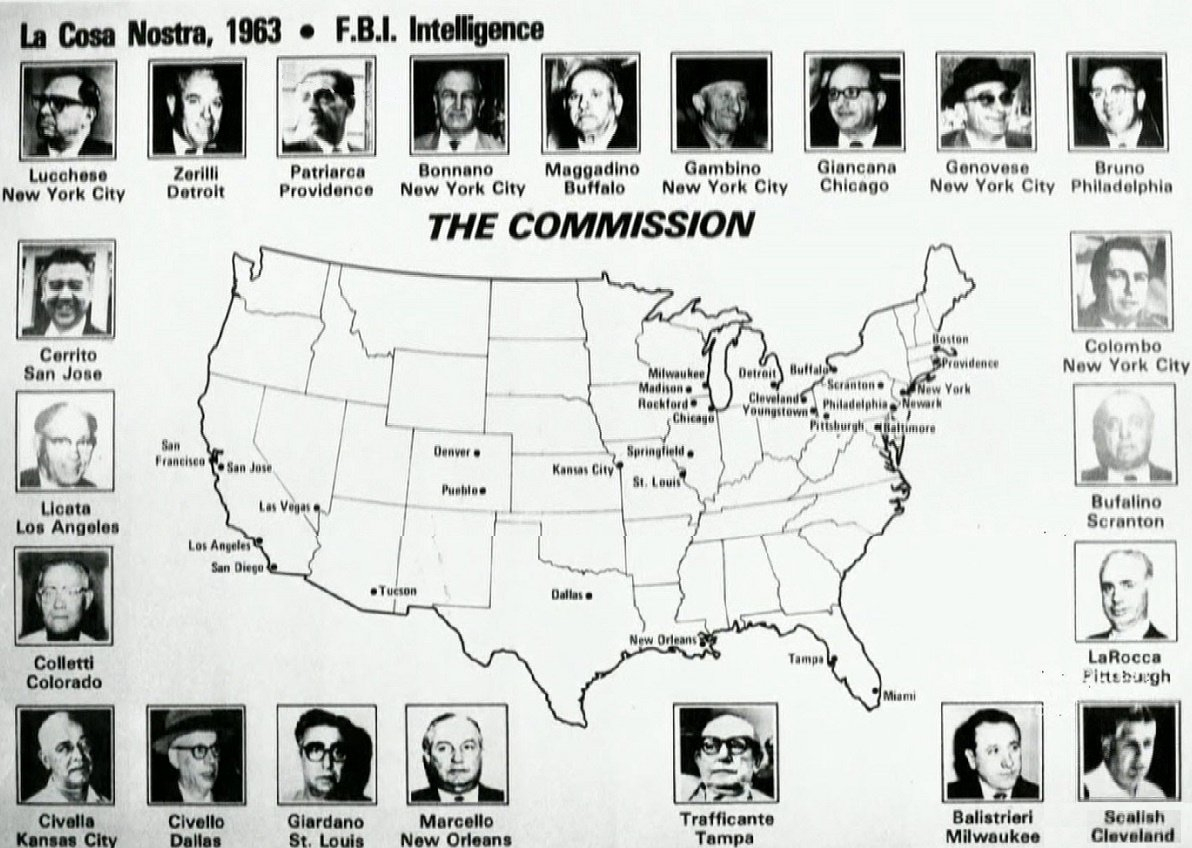
Federal Bureau of Investigation chart of American Mafia bosses in 1963

== Events ==
- January 17 – In the midst of the First Mafia War on Sicily, Mafia boss Salvatore La Barbera disappears.
- January 23 – Angered by the kidnapping and murder of Kenosha vending machine distributor Anthony J. Biernat case, Wisconsin Governor John W. Reynolds, former state attorney general, says bluntly that organized crime has a strong network across the state, centered in Milwaukee, Kenosha and Fond du Lac. The district attorneys of all three counties staunchly deny the existence of such a thing in their bailiwicks, even though it has been an open secret for years. Many local public officials' comments seem to be concerned mostly with the risk of damaging Wisconsin's or their area's reputation and with avoiding the risk of embarrassing anyone, rather than with controlling crime and fighting corruption.
- Salvatore "Sally the Sheik" Musacchio, acting head of the Profaci crime family since the death of Giuseppe Magliocco months earlier, dies.
- April 26 – Sicilian Mafia boss Cesare Manzella is killed by a car bomb in his home town Cinisi during the First Mafia War. He is succeeded by Gaetano Badalamenti as head of the Cinisi Mafia.
- May 6 – Irving Vine, a low ranking member for Edward Vogel and Ralph Pierce, is murdered in a South Side, Chicago, hotel after volunteering to appear as a government witness against Murrey "the Camel" Humphreys on behalf of the Internal Revenue Service.
- May 25 – In the midst of the First Mafia War on Sicily, Mafia boss Angelo La Barbera is shot in Milan and severely wounded. He is arrested in the hospital. Tommaso Buscetta admits to having accepted a contract to kill Angelo La Barbera, but claims that someone else carried out the shooting in Milan before he could.
- June 6 – Emile Colontuono, a member of Joe Gallo's organization, is killed in Manhattan during the Gallo-Profaci War. Another Gallo member, Alfred Mondella, is also killed that day.
- June 30 – Ciaculli massacre. A car bomb in Ciaculli kills seven police and military officers sent to defuse it after an anonymous phone call. The bomb was intended for Salvatore "Ciaschiteddu" Greco, head of the Sicilian Mafia Commission and the boss of the Ciaculli Mafia family. The Ciaculli massacre is the culmination point of the First Mafia War between rival clans in Palermo. The public outrage over the Ciaculli massacre changed the Mafia war into a war against the Mafia. It prompted the first concerted anti-Mafia efforts by the state in post-war Italy. The Sicilian Mafia Commission was dissolved and of those mafiosi who had escaped arrest many went abroad.
- July 6 – The Italian Antimafia Commission meets for the first time.
- July –
  - New York mobster Hugh "Apples" McIntosh is ambushed and wounded during the Gallo-Profaci War.
  - The Gallo-Profaci War claims another victim as Ali Waffa is killed.
- September 27 – 28 – Appearing before Senate Investigations subcommittee, government informant Joseph Valachi publicly reveals the existence of the "Cosa Nostra" (which was broadcast both on television and radio) and describing his initiation and details of the Castellammarese War period as well as naming Vito Genovese as the "boss of bosses" (capo di tutti i capi) of the Italian-American Mafia.
- December 28 – Joseph Magliocco, leader of the Profaci crime family since June 1962, dies of a heart attack, at the age of 65, at Good Samaritan Hospital in West Islip, New York, his death remaining a secret from federal authorities for almost a week. Magliocco, brother-in-law of Joseph Profaci, also was observed by federal agents attending the Apalachin conference in 1957.

== Deaths ==
- Salvatore Musacchio "Sally the Sheik", Profaci crime family leader and associate of Frank Livorsi
- May 6 – Irving Vine, associate of Edward Vogel and Ralph Pierce
- June 18 – Alfred Mondella, New York mobster and Joe Gallo gunman
- June 6 – Emile Colantuono, New York mobster and Joe Gallo gunman
- July 26 – Ali Waffa, New York mobster
- December 28 – Joseph Magliocco, leader of the Profaci crime family
