= 1965 in organized crime =

In 1965, a number of events took place in organized crime.

== Events ==
- Conversations made by mobster Simone "Sam The Plumber" DeCavalcante and his Capo Louis LaRasso are monitored and recorded by federal agents.
- Carlo Gambino learned that his underboss Joseph Biondo had been hiding money from the family and demoted Biondo and replaced him with former Albert Anastasia loyalist Aniello Dellacroce who had operated a street crew out of the Ravenite Social Club at 247 Mulberry Street in Little Italy.
- January 13 – Vincent Rao, in exchange for protection from federal prosecution, agrees to testify against the Lucchese crime family's criminal operations.
- January 15 – According to federal authorities, it is reported with the absence of Joseph Bonanno the Bonanno crime family has begun to splinter into two factions led by Salvatore Bonanno and Gaspar DiGregorio which is expecting to lead to a civil war within the New York crime family.
- March 18 – New York mobster Vincent Rao is indicted for perjury by a federal grand jury.
- April 24 – Owney Madden, one of the last surviving Prohibition gangsters, dies of natural causes at a hospital in Hot Springs, Arkansas.
- June 1 – Chicago Outfit bos Sam Giancana was incarcerated for contempt after refusing to testify under an offer of immunity before a Federal grand jury probing organized crime in the Chicago area. Released on May 31, 1966, he subsequently fled to Latin America, where he stayed until expelled by Mexican authorities on July 19, 1974.
- September 11 – Manny Skar, a Chicago syndicate gambler and nightclub owner, is killed shortly before turning over evidence regarding the Chicago Outfit to federal authorities.
- November 23 – Hours after his escape from federal authorities, in which he had pulled a revolver, Murray "The Camel" Humphreys is found dead of an apparent heart attack.

== Births ==
- December 11 – Raúl León, Ranking Mexican Mafia member

== Deaths ==
- April 24 – Owney Madden, Prohibition gangster and leader of the Gophers street gang.
- September 11 – Manny Skar, a Chicago Outfit member and nightclub owner involved in illegal gambling
- November 23 – Murray Humphreys, Chicago Outfit member
