= 1969 in organized crime =

In 1969, a number of events took place in organized crime.

== Events ==
- Sicily – Giuseppe "Pippo" Calo becomes head of the Porta Nuova, Palermo Clan.
- Sicilian mafioso and Corleonesi boss Luciano Leggio tried for his role in a mafia war, sparked by the murder of former boss Michele Navarra on Leggio's orders. Leggio is acquitted, probably due to witness intimidation.
- New York mobster Wilfred "Willy Boy" Johnson, and childhood friend of John Gotti, agrees to become an informant for the FBI after the Gambino crime family refused to support his wife while in prison.
- Fujinomiya, Shizuoka, Japan – Tadamasa Goto formed the Goto-gumi, a yakuza organization which later grew to be one of the most powerful affiliates of the Yamaguchi-gumi.
- February 5 – Thomas Zummo, a lieutenant in the DiGregorio faction of the Bonanno crime family, is killed. He is the last victim of the "Bananas War" of the 1960s.
- February 14 – Vito Genovese dies of a heart attack in a Springfield, Missouri prison hospital, while serving a 15-year sentence for drug trafficking. Following the death of Genovese, the leadership of the Genovese crime family falls to Thomas Eboli (previously run by the "Committee" Thomas "Tommy Ryan" Eboli, Gerardo "Jerry" Catena, Michele "Mr. Big" Miranda, Philip "Benny Squint" Lombardo), however it is suspected Eboli may have been placed as a "Front Boss" to draw attention away from another high-ranking member – Philip Lombardo.
- July 17 - Boston Consigliere and policy racketeer, Joseph "Big Joe L" Lombardo, dies of natural causes (not to be confused with the Chicago Outfit's Joseph "Joey the Clown" Lombardo).
- December 10 – Michele Cavataio and three of his men are killed in the Viale Lazio in Palermo by a Mafia hit squad including Bernardo Provenzano, Calogero Bagarella (an elder brother of Leoluca Bagarella the brother-in-law of Totò Riina), Emanuele D’Agostino of Stefano Bontade’s Santa Maria di Gesù Family and Damiano Caruso a soldier of Giuseppe Di Cristina, the Mafia boss of Riesi. Cavataio was able to shoot and kill Calogero Bagarella and wounding one of Di Cristina’s men before Provenzano killed him. Provenzano saved the situation with his submachine gun and earned himself a reputation as a Mafia killer with the attack. The Viale Lazio massacre marked the end of a ‘pax mafiosa’ that had reigned since the Ciaculli massacre until the end of the Trial of the 114.

== Arts and literature ==
- The Godfather (novel) by Mario Puzo.
- The Last Words of Dutch Schultz (novel) by William S. Burroughs.

== Deaths ==
- February 5 – Thomas Zummo, DiGregorio-Bonanno crime family lieutenant
- February 14 – Vito Genovese "Don Vito", New York mobster and Boss of the Genovese Crime Family
- July 17 - Joseph Lombardo, Boston policy racketeer
- December 30 - Julius Richard "Dixie" Davis, defense lawyer and associate of Dutch Schultz
