= 1970 in organized crime =

In 1970, a number of events took place in organized crime.

== Events ==
- Sicilian Mafia Commission (Cupola) is reinstated. The Cupola disbanded in 1963 after the Ciaculli Massacre. The new Cupola is headed by a triumvirate consisting of Cinisi Mafia boss Gaetano Badalamenti, Stefano Bontade of the Santa Maria di Gesu Family and Luciano Leggio of the Corleonesi, often substituted by Totò Riina.
- January 28 - New Jersey mobster Angelo "The Gyp" DeCarlo is convicted of loansharking and extortion, and imprisoned.
- March 26 - John "Sonny" Franzese, Colombo Crime Family Capo and father of Michael Franzese, is imprisoned until 1979. He had previously been involved in receiving kickback payments from the recording industry.
- June 11 – Former Bonanno Family Capo Gaspar DiGregorio dies of natural causes.
- August 27 - Sicilian mafioso, Tommaso Buscetta, is arrested in New York on a pending double murder conviction in Italy but because of no request for extradition he is released.
- September 16 – Italian journalist Mauro De Mauro disappears while preparing the film "Il Caso Mattei" about the mysterious death of Enrico Mattei, the president of Italy’s national oil company Ente Nazionale Idrocarburi (ENI), in 1962. Director Francesco Rosi had asked De Mauro to investigate Mattei's last days in Sicily. De Mauro soon obtained an audio tape of Mattei's last speech and spent days studying it. De Mauro disappeared 8 days after his retrieval of the tape without leaving a trace. His body was never found.

== Deaths ==
- June 11 - Gaspar DiGregorio, former Bonanno Family Capo
