= 1964 in organized crime =

== Events ==
- The long time civil war between the Sicilian mafiosi comes to an end as the bloody violence and savage warfare cause massive public opposition, many of whom breaking "omerta", as Sicilian authorities are pressured to investigate the centuries-old secret society.
- Luciano Leggio, the Corleonesi boss of the Sicilian mafia, is captured after years on the run.
- Francesco Bontade dies, leaving his son Stefano Bontade in control of the Santa Maria di Gesù mafia family.
- Italian politician, Salvatore Lima admits ties to Angelo La Barbera, one of Palermo's most powerful mobsters.
- Paul Sciacca, a former member of the Bonanno crime family, defects to the Gasparino DiGregorio faction and several years later takes control of the fractured crime family.
- Judge John L. Coffey's "John Doe" inquiry into corruption in Milwaukee city police and the Milwaukee County Sheriff's Department includes gambling, prostitution and bribery, results in more than 30 police officers (including the head of the city vice squad) and deputy sheriffs losing their jobs; but fails to touch Frank Balistrieri's control of local crime.
- January 19 – Santo Perrone, Capo-Faction Leader in Detroit crime family, is severely wounded by a car bomb and later loses his right leg.
- March 18 – John C. Montana, a prominent New York mobster, dies of natural causes in Buffalo General Hospital at the age of 70.
- October 21 – Joseph Bonanno, scheduled to testify before a federal grand jury, is abducted by unknown assailants from his Park Avenue apartment building. Bonanno's brother-in-law, Frank LaBruzzo, assumes leadership of the crime family but is voted out by the Mafia Ruling Commission in favor of Gaspar DiGregorio. Consigliere John Tartamella's health would force him to resign as Salvatore Bonanno, son of Joseph Bonanno, assumes position of consigliere of the Bonanno crime family.

== Births ==
- August 31 – Ramón Eduardo Arellano Félix, Mexican drug lord and Tijuana Cartel member

== Deaths ==
- Francesco Bontade, Sicilian mafioso, boss of the Santa Maria di Gesù mafia family
- March 18 - John C. Montana, high-ranking member of the Buffalo crime family
