= 1972 in organized crime =

In 1972, a number of events took place in organized crime.

== Events ==
- St. Louis, Missouri, Mafia boss Tony Giordano is convicted of illegally skimming gambling proceeds from Aladdin Hotel & Casino in Paradise, Nevada with the Emprise Corporation, a legal news wire service, with underboss and boss of the Detroit Mafia, Michael "Big Mike" Polizzi and Anthony "Tony Z" Zerilli.
- Politician Giulio Andreotti is elected Prime Minister of Italy; the first of three elections won by Andreotti for the title of Prime Minister. He would later be convicted of mafia association and conspiracy to murder.
- Carmine "Mr. Gribs" Tramunti assumes the leadership of the Lucchese crime family.
- Tommaso Buscetta arrested in New York for the second time on a double murder conviction in Italy. This time he is extradited to Italy to begin a life sentence.
- Frank Joseph Valenti, a New York syndicate leader and gambling racketeer, is imprisoned.
- John F. "Sonny" Castagna, an associate of the Patriarca crime family, is convicted of manslaughter.
- April 7 – Joe Gallo is murdered at Umberto's Clam House in New York's Little Italy, while celebrating his 43rd birthday. His bodyguard Peter "Pete the Greek" Diapoulas survives the attack however. Investigators suspected that Colombo Family consigliere Joseph Yacovelli set up the assassination.
- April 10 – New York mobster Frank Ferriano is murdered while driving near the Holland Tunnel.
- April 19 – David Wolosky is gunned down outside Beth Israel Hospital in Manhattan.
- July 16 – Thomas Eboli, "front boss" of the Genovese crime family, is shot five times in his head and neck and killed while staying at his girlfriend's Brooklyn home in Crown Heights. Capo Frank "Funzi" Tieri is selected to replace Eboli, but the real power behind the throne since 1969 is Philip "Benny Squint" Lombardo
- August 11 – An unidentified gunman shot 4 men, 2 to death, at the Neapolitan Noodle, a Manhattan restaurant. The victims were wholesale meat dealers, having been mistaken apparently for Alphonse Persico, Gennaro Langella, and other members of the Colombo Family faction, who were dining at the restaurant the same time. The shooting was likely orchestrated by the remaining powers in the Gallo gang, including Joe Gallo’s youngest brother, Albert "Kid Blast" Gallo and Frank Illiano.
- November 13 – Joseph Yacovelli, Carmine Persico, Carmine DiBiase, and Joseph Russo, of the Colombo Family, are indicted for their efforts to enable Russo to avoid prosecution for murder. Mistrial is declared in the case against Persico and Russo on September 25, 1973, due to prejudicial publicity relating to Persico's background.
- December 28 – A loanshark for the Gambino crime family, known only as "Junior", is abducted from a Staten Island neighborhood by James McBratney and "Crazy" Eddie Maloney and held for ransom. Although the two successfully received $21,000 for his release, McBratney was identified as one of the kidnappers after local kids had witnessed the attack and copied the licence plate number. The two Irish gangsters has been successfully kidnapping New York mobsters over the past two months.

== Arts and literature ==
- The Godfather (film) starring Marlon Brando, Al Pacino, James Caan, Richard S. Castellano, Robert Duvall, Diane Keaton and John Cazale.
- Maffia, La (film)
- The Mechanic (film) starring Charles Bronson.
- Prime Cut (film) starring Lee Marvin and Gene Hackman.
- The Valachi Papers (film) starring Charles Bronson.

== Deaths ==
- April 7 – Joe Gallo "Crazy Joey", New York mobster
- April 10 – Frank Ferriano, New York mobster
- April 19 – David Wolosky
- July 16 – Thomas Eboli "Tommy Ryan", Genovese crime family leader
