= Johnny Dio =

American mobster (1914–1979)

- Dio in 1957
- Born: Giovanni Ignazio Dioguardi; April 29, 1914; Lower East Side, Manhattan, New York City, U.S.
- Died: January 12, 1979 (aged 64); Lewisburg, Pennsylvania, U.S.
- Resting place: St. John Cemetery, Queens, New York City, U.S.
- Other name: John Dioguardi
- Occupation: Mobster
- Spouse: Anne Chrostek
- Children: 3
- Allegiance: Lucchese Crime Family
- Convictions: Extortion, conspiracy, racketeering (1937); Tax evasion (1954); Bankruptcy fraud (1966)

Giovanni Ignazio "John" Dioguardi (/ˌdiːoʊˈɡwɑːrdi/ DEE-oh-GWAR-dee, Italian: [dʒoˈvanni iɲˈɲattsjo di.oˈɡwardi]; April 29, 1914 – January 12, 1979), known as Johnny Dio, was an American organized crime figure and a labor racketeer. He is known for being involved in the acid attack which led to the blinding of newspaper columnist Victor Riesel, and for his role in creating fake labor union locals to help Jimmy Hoffa become General President of the Teamsters.

== Childhood and early criminal career ==
John Dioguardi was born on April 29, 1914, on the Lower East Side of Manhattan, New York City, and brought up on Forsyth Street in Little Italy, to Giovanni B. Dioguardi and Rose Plumeri, both immigrants from Baucina, in the Province of Palermo, Sicily. He was the eldest of three brothers, including Thomas (Tommy Dio) and Frank J. (Frankie Dio) Dioguardi. His father was murdered in August 1930 in what police called a mob-related execution. Dioguardi's uncle, James "Jimmy Doyle" Plumeri, was a member of the gang run by Albert Marinelli and his patron, Charles "Lucky" Luciano, head of the rapidly forming Luciano Crime Family. Dioguardi was introduced to organized crime at the age of 15 by his uncle. At the time, labor racketeering in the garment district was controlled by Luciano and Tommaso "Tommy" Gagliano, head of the Gagliano Crime Family. Plumeri, John Dioguardi, and brother Tommy were working for both gangs. He also associated with hitmen and labor racketeers Louis "Lepke" Buchalter and Jacob "Gurrah" Shapiro.

With Plumeri and another gangster, Dominick Didato, Dioguardi established and ran a protection racket in New York City's garment district. He was arrested several times between 1926 and 1937, but never brought to trial. For a time in 1934, Dioguardi was executive secretary of the Allied Truckmen's Mutual Association, an employer association, and represented the employers during a strike by 1,150 Teamsters in September 1934. In March 1937, Dioguardi was arrested on charges of extortion, conspiracy, and racketeering, He pleaded guilty and received a three-year prison term in Sing Sing.

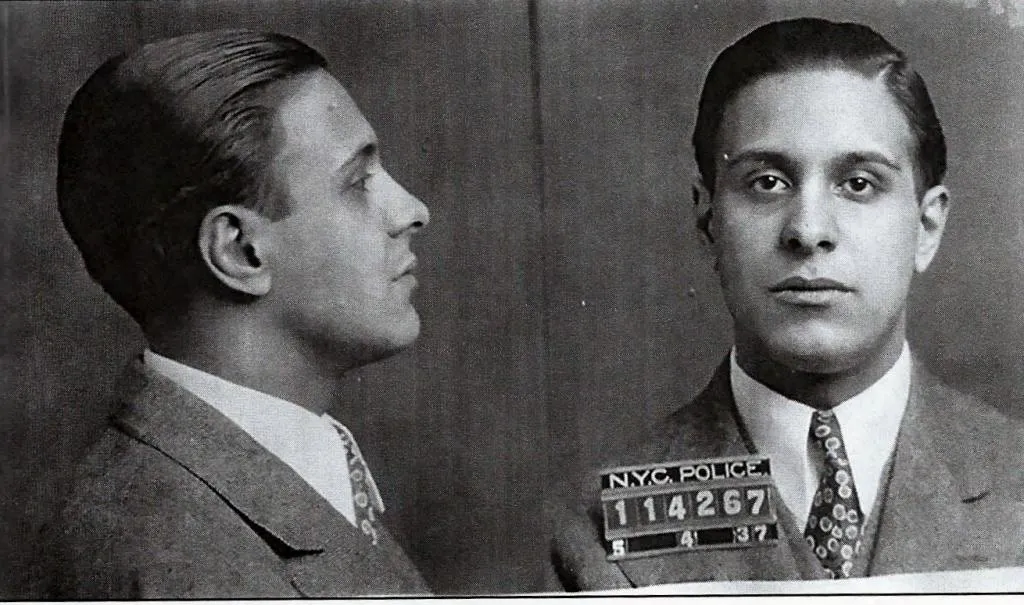
Johnny Dio mugshot c.1937

After his release from prison, Dioguardi moved to Allentown, Pennsylvania, where he established a dress manufacturing plant. He later sold the plant (taking a $11,200 bribe to ensure that it remained non-union before he sold it), and set up a dress wholesaler operation in New York City. Dioguardi also dabbled in stock investing, real estate, and trucking.

Dioguardi later returned to New York to live again on Forsyth Street. He married Anne (née Chrostek; 1913–1989), and had two sons, Philip and Dominick, and a daughter, Rosemary, who died in infancy. Philip ("Fat Philly") and Dominick later became soldiers in the Colombo and Lucchese crime families, respectively.

== Labor racketeering in the 1950s ==
In 1950, Dioguardi returned to labor racketeering. He was appointed Regional Director of the United Auto Workers-AFL (UAW-AFL), and received 12 charters for paper locals in the garment industry. Criminals formed the membership of the paper locals, and Dioguardi demanded money from employers who wished to remain union-free and extorted cash from unionized employers who wished to avoid strikes and other labor troubles. Dioguardi was arrested for extortion in July 1952. Meanwhile, New York state officials charged Dioguardi with tax evasion (see below). Although Dioguardi was never convicted for this labor racketeering incident, he was removed from his post in February 1953 by the UAW-AFL and ejected from the union in April 1954.

In the midst of the 1952-54 labor racketeering scandal, Dioguardi was charged with tax evasion. New York state tax officials charged that Dioguardi had taken a bribe when selling his Pennsylvania dress factory, and failed to report the bribe as income. Dioguardi denied the charge, but he was found guilty in March 1954 and sentenced to 60 days in prison. This conviction, rather than the allegations of labor racketeering, was the basis used to remove him from his UAW-AFL position.

=== Teamsters paper locals scandal ===
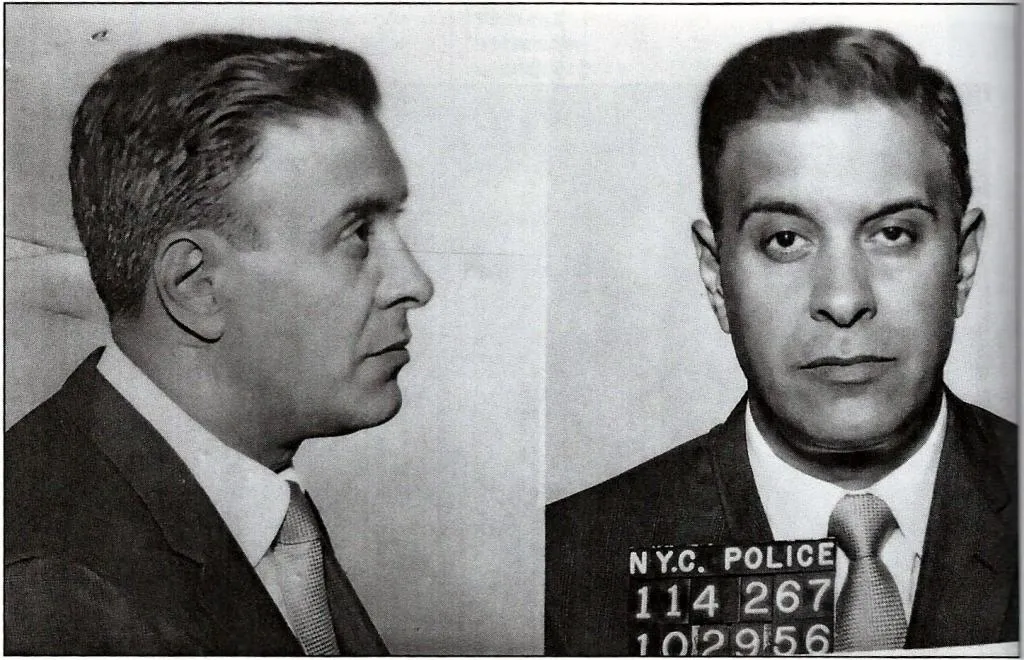
Johnny Dio mugshot c.1956

Dioguardi's association with the International Brotherhood of Teamsters was a long one. He became acquainted with New York City Teamsters leaders Martin T. Lacey and John J. O'Rourke in 1934, when Dioguardi represented the employers in a trucking strike. Dioguardi was involved again with the Teamsters by 1954, when police suspected him of involvement in a protection racket run by several Teamsters locals aimed at trucking employers. His ties soon deepened. He met in a New York City hotel room with Midwestern Teamsters leader Jimmy Hoffa and plotted to help Hoffa oust Teamsters General President Dave Beck. Between November 29 and December 15, 1955, Dioguardi obtained charters from the Teamsters for seven paper locals. O'Rourke, a Hoffa ally, was planning to challenge Lacey (a Beck supporter) for the presidency of the 125,000-member New York City Teamsters Joint Council. Winning control of the delegate-rich Joint Council would significantly boost Hoffa's chances of ousting Beck, and might lead other large, important joint councils and locals to join a Hoffa bandwagon. O'Rourke fought to have the "Dio locals" admitted to the Joint Council, and a major political battle broke out in the international union over admitting the new unions. After a deadlocked election, the seating of the "Dio locals", the unseating of the "Dio locals", a grand jury investigation, several rulings by President Beck, and a successful lawsuit by Lacey, Lacey withdrew from his re-election bid and O'Rourke was elected president of the Joint Council. Although more paper locals established by Dioguardi petitioned for membership in the Joint Council, the Teamsters dismantled nearly all the "Dio locals" by mid-1959.

=== McClellan Committee revelations ===
Beginning in 1955, the Permanent Subcommittee on Investigations of the U.S. Senate Committee on Government Operations began holding hearings into labor racketeering. Senator John L. McClellan, chair of the committee and chair of the subcommittee, hired Robert F. Kennedy as the subcommittee's chief counsel and investigator. Dioguardi became an object of the subcommittee's inquiries in March 1956. Initially, the subcommittee limited its investigation to the "Dio locals" scandal.

On January 30, 1957, the United States Senate created the Select Committee on Improper Activities in Labor and Management. The select committee was directed to study the extent of criminal or other improper practices in the field of labor-management relations or in groups of employees or employers. Membership was derived from the two standing committees, the Committee on Government Operations and the Committee on Labor and Public Welfare. The Select Committee continued to focus on Dioguardi's activities. In February 1957, the Select Committee released Federal Bureau of Investigation wiretaps which showed Hoffa and Dioguardi allegedly discussing the establishment of a paper local to organize New York City's 30,000 taxi cab drivers and then use the charter as a means of extorting money from a wide variety of employers. Testifying before the Select Committee, Hoffa claimed that the tapes only showed that he wanted the best organizer in the city to work on the taxi organizing campaign, and that he could not have engaged in conspiracy because Dioguardi was not a member of the Teamsters union. The Select Committee accused Hoffa of being behind the "Dio locals", and of arranging for a $400,000 loan to the graft-ridden International Longshoremen's Association in a bid to take over that union and gain Teamsters control of the waterfront as well as warehouses. Dioguardi, who by this time was in prison serving time on bribery and conspiracy charges (see below), was paroled by a federal court in order to testify at the Select Committee's hearings. The Select Committee developed evidence that the UAW-AFL had paid Dioguardi $16,000 to leave the union but he wouldn't, and that even after his ouster Dioguardi had maintained effective control over his UAW-AFL paper locals for nearly a year. Michigan Governor G. Mennen Williams testified that, when he was director of the Mennen toiletries company, Dioguardi asked him for a $15,000 bribe in order to call off a 1951 strike. In a two-hour appearance before the Select Committee, Dioguardi invoked his Fifth Amendment right against self-incrimination 140 times, and refused to answer any of the committee's questions. The Select Committee's evidence was further undermined when one of its star witnesses against Dioguardi was found to be mentally incompetent.

A notorious and iconic photograph of Dioguardi was taken at the time of his testimony (see infobox, above). As Dioguardi was leaving the committee hearing room, a crowd of press photographers gathered around him. Dioguardi attempted to flee so that his photograph would not be taken. United Press photographer Stanley Tetrick raced ahead of Dioguardi to take a photograph. International News Photos photographer Jim Mahan snapped a photograph (see infobox, above) of a snarling Dioguardi, cigarette dangling from his mouth, pushing Tetrick out of the way with one hand (not shown) and his other clenched in a tight fist (not shown). Dioguardi also screamed, "You sons of bitches, I got a family!" The photograph was widely published in American newspapers, and became an iconic image of Dioguardi, mafioso in general, and the way in which chic dress and charm conceal brutality and thuggery. The image is also a widely known symbol of Teamsters union corruption.

=== Role in Victor Riesel acid attack ===
In the midst of the Teamsters paper locals scandal, Dioguardi was indicted for planning the acid attack on crusading newspaper columnist Victor Riesel. At 3 a.m. on April 5, 1956, an unknown assailant threw a vial of acid into Riesel's face as he left a late-night interview at Lindy's, an attack that left the journalist permanently blind. The FBI identified Abraham Telvi as the assailant in August 1956, but Telvi had been murdered on July 28, 1956, by mobsters for demanding an additional $50,000 on top of the $500 he had already received for the crime. On August 29, 1956, Dioguardi was arrested for conspiracy in the Riesel attack, pleaded not guilty, and was released on $100,000 bond even though prosecutors later publicly linked him to the Telvi murder.

Dioguardi was tried separately for the attack on Riesel. Joseph Carlino, the Dioguardi associate who had hired Telvi to attack Riesel, pleaded guilty on October 22, and prosecutors severed Dioguardi's trial from the others. Carlino later testified that Dioguardi had ordered Gandolfo Maranti to find a hitman and identify Riesel, and that Maranti had contacted Dominick Bando to assist him in finding the hitman (Bando contacting Carlino, who sought out Telvi). Maranti and Bando were found guilty (Bando pleading guilty at the last moment).

Conspiracy charges against Dioguardi were later dropped despite the convictions. Dioguardi's attorney delayed the trial for nearly five months with motions. When the trial finally began, Carlino and Miranti recanted their pre-trial statements and courtroom testimony, claiming they did not know who had ordered the attack on Riesel. By September 1957, the government no longer sought to prosecute Dioguardi for the attack.

=== Extortion and tax evasion trials ===
Dioguardi's legal troubles worsened during his trial for the Riesel attack, when he was indicted in October 1956 on extortion and conspiracy charges. The indictment alleged that Dioguardi and others had extorted money from truck drivers in the New York City garment industry, and received bribes from employers in exchange for refusing to call strikes. Dioguardi's trial was due to begin in January 1957, but key government witnesses either refused to testify or recanted earlier statements implicating Dio in the labor rackets. Dioguardi sought lengthy delays once again prior to his trial, but the court refused to permit them and empanelled a special jury to try him. Dioguardi's bond was revoked in June 1957, and his trial resumed.

Dioguardi was convicted of extortion in July 1957. Key prosecution witnesses again recanted their testimony against him. The special jury considered the case for nine days, but nonetheless found him guilty on July 25, 1957, and he was sentenced in September to two years in prison.

As Dioguardi was awaiting sentencing in his extortion case, a federal grand jury indicted him on tax evasion charges. Dioguardi denied the charges and again sought lengthy trial delays, but the government halted the trial.

The reason for the tax trial delay soon became apparent as state charges on extortion and conspiracy were once more brought against Dioguardi. The charges had originated in June 1956, but Dioguardi had never been prosecuted. With the collapse of the Riesel case, state officials finally decided to act on the 1956 indictment and Dioguardi's second trial for labor racketeering began two days after his tax evasion trial halted. Dioguardi's tactic of delay was denied once more, and he was quickly found guilty on both charges in December 1957. He was sentenced to 15 years in Sing Sing, and began serving time on January 10, 1958. However, Dioguardi appealed his conviction, and on June 23, 1959, a New York state appellate court reversed his conviction.

Within an hour of his release from state prison, however, Dioguardi was re-arrested on federal tax evasion charges. His tax evasion trial began in March 1960, he was found guilty a month later, and was sentenced to four years in federal prison. Although a United States court of appeals reversed his conviction and ordered him retried in July 1960, a United States district court found that he had filed his appeal too late and reinstated his conviction.

== Later life and legal troubles ==
Dioguardi's state sentence on extortion and conspiracy ended in June 1959, and he entered federal custody to serve his sentence for tax evasion. He was paroled in 1963, and went to work for Consumers Kosher Provision (a kosher meat products supplier).

=== Stock and bankruptcy fraud trials ===
In April 1966, Dioguardi and his son, Dominick, were indicted for bankruptcy fraud. According to prosecutors, Consumers Kosher Provision was losing market share to its competitor, American Kosher Provisions. Owner Herman Rose asked the Lucchese crime family for help, and Dominick Dioguardi convinced Rose that his father (up for parole and needing a job in order to win his release) could help. Rose died in July 1964, and soon Dioguardi and the Genovese crime family, in control of American Kosher, agreed to merge the two companies. The merging companies then attempted to dominate the kosher meat market in the United States. Local unions of the Amalgamated Meat Cutters controlled by the Lucchese and Genovese crime families would selectively strike other kosher meat producers, causing supermarkets to switch to the merged company in order to ensure a steady supply. Distributors and supermarkets were also bribed or coerced by mobsters to switch kosher meat suppliers. The company also slashed costs by distributing spoiled and rotten meat to stores, and raising prices dramatically. Companies such as First National Kosher Provisions, Mizrach Kosher Provisions, Tel Aviv Kosher Provisions, Finest Kosher Provisions, and others were taken over when they collapsed and assets (raw and processed meat) transferred back and forth among them. Thomas Plumeri ("Jimmy Doyle" Plumeri's son and Dioguardi's nephew) was named Consumers Kosher's president, and Dominick Dioguardi the company's vice president. Consumers Kosher filed for bankruptcy in January 1965, and Dioguardi (who was not part of the management team) ordered his son and Plumeri to sell more than $33,000 in raw and processed meat assets and disburse the money received to Dioguardi and other mob associates. Dioguardi was convicted on November 10, 1967, and received a five-year prison sentence. He appealed his conviction, but his appeal was denied and he began serving his prison term in October 1970.

While Dioguardi's appeal in his bankruptcy fraud conviction was pending, he was indicted for securities fraud. According to prosecutors, Dioguardi and Anthony Di Lorenzo, heir-apparent to the Genovese crime family, conspired to purchase 28,000 shares of Belmont Franchising Corporation, a substantially worthless over-the-counter stock. Dioguardi, Di Lorenzo and others opened accounts at numerous brokerages under false names, and purchased shares of Belmont from themselves and from each account in an attempt to inflate the price. They agreed to sell the stock to other investors, and then share the proceeds (estimated at $1 million) among themselves. Lucchese crime family member Michael Hellerman, who was part of the conspiracy, turned state's evidence and entered the federal witness protection program. At trial, Dioguardi was not only accused of running the stock fraud scheme but also of beating the original owner of the shares in order to get him to sell the securities to Dioguardi for just pennies. Midway through the trial, a high-level aide to Senator Hiram Fong (R-Hawaii) pleaded guilty to charges he had attempted to quash the federal government's inquiry into the case. Dioguardi's defense attorney argued that Hellerman, the government's chief witness, could not be believed, and the jury agreed—finding Dioguardi not-guilty on July 12, 1972.

Within a year, however, Dioguardi was indicted again for stock fraud. Dio had just recently finished serving his five-year sentence for bankruptcy fraud. Prosecutors alleged that Dioguardi had conspired with Lucchese crime family boss Carmine Tramunti, Vincenzo "Vinny" Aloi, Michael Hellerman, and others to float $300,000 in fake stock in At Your Service Leasing Corp., a luxury car leasing company which did extensive business with organized crime figures. Under the scheme, prosecutors said, Dioguardi and the others bribed securities dealers to sell the stock and then pocketed the money paid by investors. This time, the jury did not believe the defense's description of Hellerman's character, and Dioguardi was convicted and given sentences of ten years and nine years in prison, to run concurrently. Dioguardi appealed his conviction, but a federal appellate court upheld his conviction. A second appeal was also made, but his conviction was upheld again.

== Death ==
Dioguardi was briefly paroled three times in order to testify about labor racketeering. The first occasion was in early 1958, when he testified before a special New York state grand jury investigating labor racketeering. The second time was in December 1967, when he testified extensively before the New York State Investigation Commission regarding labor racketeering, theft, sabotage, and assault at John F. Kennedy International Airport. He testified again before another New York state commission in May 1968.

Dioguardi's last years were spent incarcerated at Lewisburg Federal Penitentiary. His cell was on "mobsters row", a series of cells on the same level and wing of the prison where a number of famous and important organized crime figures, including Henry Hill, Carmine Galante, Paul Vario and John Gotti served time. Dio became well known for being able to get better prison work assignments for other incarcerated mobsters.

Dioguardi was increasingly in ill health in the 1970s. He had applied for parole during his stock fraud trial, arguing that his poor physical condition made prison cruel and unusual punishment, but his parole request was denied. Dioguardi appealed the decision of the parole board, but a federal appellate court upheld the parole board's decision in August 1978. Dioguardi's health became precarious. A few weeks before his death, he was moved from the federal prison to a local hospital.

Dioguardi died in the hospital on January 12, 1979. He was survived by his wife, Anne; his son and daughter.

== In popular culture ==
- Actor Frank Pellegrino portrayed Johnny Dio in the 1990 film Goodfellas.
- Dio was portrayed in the 1994 television movie Getting Gotti by actor Rino Romano.
- Johnny Dio is the basis for Lee J. Cobb's character "Johnny Friendly" in the film On the Waterfront.
- Singer Ronnie James Dio (born Ronald James Padavona) adopted the last name "Dio" after Johnny Dio.
- Archival film footage of Dio is included in the documentary film I Due Kennedy (Two Kennedys).
