= 2015 in organized crime =

In 2015, a number of events took place in organized crime. The Mexican drug war continued to be a focus throughout the year.

== Events ==
=== January ===
- January 16 – Mexican authorities arrest an alleged hitman for the Guerreros Unidos drug cartel, Felipe Rodriguez, in connection to the September 26, 2014 death of 43 college students.

=== February ===
- February 27 – Mexican security forces arrest drug lord Servando Gómez Martínez in Morelia, Michoacán.

=== March ===
- March 20 – An ambush on Mexican police in Ocotlan, Jalisco state kills ten with none of the gunmen apprehended.

=== May ===
- May 1 – Three Mexican Army soldiers die as gunfire downs a helicopter in the state of Jalisco. Ten soldiers and two Federal Police officers are injured.
- May 22 – At least 42 members of the Jalisco New Generation Cartel and two Federal Police officers are killed in a shootout in the state of Michoacán.

=== July ===
- July 11 – Mexican drug kingpin Joaquín Guzmán Loera escapes from a maximum security prison the Federal Social Readaptation Center No. 1.

=== October ===
- October 17 – Fugitive drug kingpin Joaquín "El Chapo" Guzmán suffered injuries to his leg and face as he escaped Mexican authorities who were closing in on him in the mountains in Sinaloa in northwestern Mexico.

== Arts and literature ==
- Black Mass
- Legend

== Deaths ==
- July 21 – Anthony Megale, 61, American mobster
- August 3 – Giovanni Riggi, 90, American mobster, inspiration for The Sopranos
- September 7 – Sigifredo Nájera Talamantes, Mexican drug cartel leader (Los Zetas)
- September 20 – Joseph Iannuzzi, 84, American mobster and FBI informant
- December 5 – Byron Vlahakis, 83, American mobster

== See also ==
- Timeline of the Mexican drug war
- Timeline of organized crime

== Bibliography ==
=== References ===
- Kelly, Robert J.; Schatzberg, Rufus; Chin, Ko-lin (1994). Handbook of organized crime in the United States (1994 ed.). Greenwood Publishing Group. ISBN 0-313-28366-4.
- Vilalta, C. (2011). "Monthly patterns, trends, and trajectories in the count of deaths related to organized crime, 2006-2010" (PDF). Conference at UAEM (in Spanish), April 26, 2011. Archived from the original (PDF) on 17 August 2011.
