= 2024 in organized crime =

In 2024, a number of events took place in organized crime.

== Events ==
- January 9 – President of Ecuador Daniel Noboa declares a state of emergency following the escape of José Adolfo Macías Villamar, leader of the Los Choneros drug cartel, from prison. Gangsters subsequently storm a TC Televisión newsroom in Guayaquil and launch a series of riots, kidnappings, and explosions across the country. Eight civilians are killed, including two at Centro Comercial Albán Borja, and three more injured during random shootings in Guayaquil, while two police officers are killed in Nobol. As a result, schools are closed and the military is called to stop gang activities.
- January 19 – José Alberto García Vilano, a leader within the Gulf Cartel, is arrested in Monterrey, Nuevo Leon, Mexico.
- January 21 – At least 12 gunmen are killed by security forces on a highway in Sonora, Mexico, during a failed attempt to rescue the son of a prominent Sinaloa Cartel hitman from police custody. Two officers are also injured in the shootout.
- March 1 – Four Mexican soldiers are killed by an improvised explosive device in a trap near Aguililla, Michoacán. The soldiers were inspecting a camp, likely used by cartel members, when they stepped on an anti-personnel mine set in the underbrush.
- July 25 – Sinaloa Cartel leaders Ismael "El Mayo" Zambada and Joaquín Guzmán López are arrested by agents of the United States Department of Justice in El Paso, Texas.
- September 13 – Maria Daniela Icaza, director of the Litoral Penitentiary in Guayaquil, the largest prison in Ecuador and the site of the country's deadliest prison riot in 2021, is fatally shot in her vehicle by suspected drug cartel gunmen.
- September 18 – Mexican Secretary of Defense Luis Cresencio Sandoval announces that at least 30 people have been killed since September 9 during shootouts between rival factions of the Sinaloa Cartel in Sinaloa, Mexico. Mexican President Andrés Manuel López Obrador partially blames the United States for the surge in violence.
- October 23 – Nineteen suspected cartel members are killed and one local cartel leader is arrested in a shootout between gunmen and police officers in Culiacan, Sinaloa, Mexico.
- October 28 – At least 34 people are killed in Tecpan de Galeana, Guerrero, Mexico, in cartel ambushes and clashes. Mexican police arrest 21 people, including sixteen Guatemalan and Salvadoran nationals.
- December 16 – An improvised explosive device detonates in Cotija de la Paz, Michoacán, leaving two soldiers dead and five others injured. The Secretary of National Defense, Ricardo Trevilla Trejo, blames the Cárteles Unidos for the attack.

== Arts and literature ==
- Sleeping Dogs
- The Alto Knights
- The Shadow Strays

== Deaths ==
- January 14 – Dominick Cirillo, 94, American mobster (Genovese crime family).
- August 27 – Attilio Bitondo, 96, American labor leader and gangster (Genovese crime family).
- December 4 – Joseph Corozzo, 83, American mobster.
- December 8 – Luigi Manocchio, 97, American mobster (Patriarca crime family).

== See also ==
- Timeline of the Mexican drug war
- Timeline of organized crime
