= 2020 in organized crime =

In 2020, a number of events took place in organized crime.

== Events ==
- February 21 – Mexico extradites Rubén Oseguera González, the son of Jalisco New Generation Cartel leader Nemesio Oseguera Cervantes, to the United States to face drug charges.
- April 4 – A shootout between rival cartel gangs in Chihuahua, Mexico, kills at least 19 people.
- June 26 – The Chief of Police of Mexico City, Omar García Harfuch, is injured in an assassination attempt upon him. Two of his bodyguards and a passerby were killed. Harfuch blamed the attack on the Jalisco New Generation Cartel
- July 3 – Mexican Army troops kill 12 drug cartel gunmen in Nuevo Laredo, Tamaulipas. In separate incidents, police kill five attackers in Torreón, Coahuila, and five police officers are shot dead in Guanajuato.
- August 2 – Guanajuato state officials announce that Mexican security forces captured former Santa Rosa de Lima Cartel leader José Antonio Yépez Ortiz alongside five other people.

== Arts and literature ==
- Capone
- The Tax Collector
- Night in Paradise

== Deaths ==
- February 24 – Sonny Franzese, 103, Italian-born American mobster (Colombo crime family).
- February 6 – Jhon Jairo Velásquez, 57, Colombian hitman, drug dealer and extortionist (Medellín Cartel)
- April 16 – Francesco Di Carlo, 79, Italian mobster (Sicilian Mafia) and pentito.
- May 15 – José Rodrigo Aréchiga Gamboa, 39, Mexican cartel leader.
- August 19 – Nadir Salifov, 47, Georgian-Azerbaijani mobster.
- August 20 – Frank Cullotta, 81, American mobster (Chicago Outfit).
- November 12 – Howie Winter, 91, American mobster (Winter Hill Gang).
- December 15 – Anthony Casso, 78, American mobster (Lucchese crime family).

== See also ==
- Timeline of the Mexican drug war
- Timeline of organized crime
