= 2019 in organized crime =

In 2019, a number of events took place in organized crime.

== Events ==
=== March ===
- March 13 – Frank Cali, head of the Gambino crime family, is shot dead in New York.

=== April ===
- April 17 – Guatemalan Presidential candidate Mario Estrada is captured in the United States because of his alleged connections with the Sinaloa Cartel.

=== July ===
- July 17 – Mexican drug lord Joaquín "El Chapo" Guzmán is sentenced to life in prison plus thirty years, and is ordered to forfeit US$12.6 billion.

=== August ===
- August 8 – Jalisco New Generation Cartel massacres 19 people, hanging 9 of their desecrated bodies from a bridge in Uruapan.
- August 28 – 28 people are killed in a bar fire in Coatzacoalcos, Veracruz, Mexico, that police believe was caused by an attack by drug cartels.

=== October ===
- October 14 – Fourteen state police officers are killed in an ambush in Aguililla, Michoacán, Mexico; crime-scene evidence points to the involvement of the Jalisco New Generation Cartel.
- October 18 –
  - The Mexican National Guard arrests Ovidio Guzmán López, one of former cartel leader Joaquín "El Chapo" Guzmán's sons, in Culiacán. He is later released after government forces come under intense attack and are overpowered by Sinaloa Cartel gunmen, according to Security Minister Alfonso Durazo.
  - According to a later statement, Mexican President Andrés Manuel López Obrador and government authorities ordered officers to let Guzmán López go free to avoid a "bloodbath" and "preserve the lives of our officers and bring calm back to the city"

=== December ===
- December 1 – A shootout between police officers and cartel gunmen in Villa Unión, Coahuila, Mexico, leaves at least 21 people dead.

== Arts and literature ==
- The Irishman
- Once Upon a Time in London
- Mob Town
- The Gangster, the Cop, the Devil

== Deaths ==
- March 7 – Carmine Persico, 85, American mobster and convicted racketeer, head of Colombo crime family (1973–1990, since 1993).
- March 13 – Frank Cali, 53, American mobster, head of Gambino crime family (since 2015).
- March 28 – Alphonse D'Arco, 86, American mobster, acting boss of the Lucchese crime family (1990–1991).
- May 25 – Anthony Graziano, 78, American consigliere (Bonanno crime family).
- June 17 – Somchai Khunpluem, 81, Thai mobster and politician.
- July 4 – Héctor Huerta Ríos, Mexican criminal (Beltrán-Leyva Cartel).
- July 31 – Martín Arzola Ortega, 42, Mexican convicted drug lord (Jalisco New Generation Cartel).
- October 19 – Joseph Lombardo, 90, American mobster, consigliere of the Chicago Outfit.
- November 3 – Louis Eppolito, 71, American police officer, mobster and author.

== See also ==
- Timeline of the Mexican drug war
- Timeline of organized crime
