= 2022 in organized crime =

In 2022, a number of events took place in organized crime.

== Events ==
- June 26 – A shootout occurs between the Mexican federal police and drug cartels in Nuevo León, close to the Mexico–United States border. Six officers are killed and four others injured.
- July 15 – Ex-leader of the Guadalajara Cartel Rafael Caro Quintero is captured by the Mexican Navy in Choix, Sinaloa, Mexico.
- August 10 – Cartel gunmen in Mexico burn down dozens of stores and block streets with burning cars in the states of Jalisco and Guanajuato in response to arrests of cartel figures by the National Guard.

== Arts and literature ==
- The Outfit
- White Elephant
- Where the Wind Blows

== Deaths ==
- January 22 – Ralph Natale, 86, American mobster (Philadelphia crime family).
- January 27 – Arnold Squitieri, 85, American mobster.
- March 10 – Mario Gigante, 98, American mobster (Genovese crime family).
- June 3 – Raffaele Ganci, 90, Italian mobster
- June 13 – Cosimo Di Lauro, 48, Italian mobster (Di Lauro clan).
- September 16 – Amedeo Matacena, 59, Italian shipowner, mobster and politician, deputy (1994–2001).
- October 22 – Umberto Bellocco, 84, Italian mobster, founder of Bellocco 'ndrina.
- December 13 – Frank Salemme, 89, American mobster (Patriarca crime family).

== See also ==
- Timeline of the Mexican drug war
- Timeline of organized crime
