= 2026 in organized crime =

In 2026, a number of events took place in organized crime.

== Events ==
- January 3 – As part of the Operation Southern Spear, and the wider war on drugs, the United States orders airstrikes on Caracas, Venezuela, and captures Venezuelan president Nicolás Maduro and takes him to New York to be tried on drug and weapons charges.
- January 6 – Former Venezuelan president Nicolás Maduro and his wife Cilia Flores plead not guilty to charges of drug trafficking and narcoterrorism.
- January 12 –
  - Swedish police seize three tonnes of cocaine found in a shipping container from South America at the Port of Helsingborg, making it the country's single-largest seizure of the illegal drug.
  - Spanish police, in coordination with the UK National Crime Agency and the US DEA, seize 10 tonnes of cocaine hidden among a cargo of salt on a cargo ship off the Canary Islands. It is the country's largest ever seizure of drugs at sea. Thirteen people on board the vessel are arrested.
- January 13 – Mexican police arrest six alleged Tren de Aragua members operating in Mexico City on charges of drug trafficking, extortion, and human trafficking.
- January 29 – Eleven members of a Burmese mafia family are executed in China.
- February 13 – The United States Armed Forces says it has conducted an airstrike on a boat suspected of transporting illegal narcotics in the Caribbean Sea, killing three people.
- February 22 – Nemesio Oseguera Cervantes (alias "El Mencho"), leader of the Jalisco New Generation Cartel (CJNG), is killed during a security operation carried out by the Mexican Armed Forces near Tapalpa, Jalisco. In response, CJNG members launched coordinated retaliatory attacks, including road blockades involving burning vehicles and improvised checkpoints across multiple states.
- February 23 – Hugo César Macías Ureña, described as El Mencho's right-hand man, is fatally shot following him reportedly offering up to MX$20,000 for each soldier killed in retaliation for the death of El Mencho the previous day.
- March 13 – Bolivian authorities arrest suspected Uruguayan drug cartel leader Sebastián Marset during a police operation in Santa Cruz de la Sierra. Marset, who is wanted by several countries and has a US$2 million reward linked to money laundering allegations, is detained along with four other individuals.
- March 18 – Ángel Esteban Aguilar Morales aka Lobo Menor, an Ecuadorean national suspected of leading the Los Lobos gang and wanted in Ecuador over the assassination of Fernando Villavicencio in 2023, is arrested in Mexico City and extradited to Colombia, where he is also wanted on charges of involvement with FARC dissidents.
- March 19 – A raid kills eleven members of the Sinaloa Cartel in Sinaloa, with a senior cartel leader being captured along with many weapons.
- April 16 – Five gunmen are killed and a state trooper is wounded during a security operation in Los Herreras, Nuevo León. Authorities implement coordinated surveillance in the area for more suspects.
- May 1 – Rubén Rocha Moya announces he will temporarily step down as governor of Sinaloa, after the U.S. files charges alleging links to the Sinaloa Cartel.
- May 26 – Mexico arrests Isai Martínez Zepeda, identified by authorities as a nephew of imprisoned former Sinaloa Cartel leader El Chapo, in Sonora.
- June 10 – Five state troopers are killed and five more wounded in an ambush by suspected Jalisco New Generation Cartel gunmen near the town of Mojonera, Nahuatzen, Mexico.
- June 12 – U.S. president Donald Trump announces that a joint U.S.–Venezuela operation has killed Tren de Aragua leader Niño Guerrero.
- June 30 – The U.S. treasury department announces sanctions on two men and nine companies accused of being involved in transportation, financial services, and real estate for the Jalisco New Generation Cartel.
- July 20 – A federal court in New York sentences Sinaloa Cartel co-founder El Mayo to life imprisonment and orders $15 billion in forfeiture after he pled guilty to charges related to leading the cartel.
- July 23 – The U.S. state department, in coordination with the Mexican finance ministry, sanctions over 50 Mexican individuals and companies allegedly linked to the Jalisco New Generation Cartel.
- August 27 – NORAD and the U.S. Northern Command say that the U.S. military used a laser weapon against three drones belonging to Mexican drug cartels.
- August 30 – Mexican security forces kill Los Reyes cartel leader Luis Enrique Barragán Chávez and his bodyguard during an operation in Tocumbo, Michoacán, after coming under gunfire.
- November 8 – Mexican Navy personnel working with intelligence from the National Intelligence Center and the U.S. DEA, arrest Rafael Álvarez Ayala, the alleged leader of the Jalisco New Generation Cartel cell "Los Rs", in Zapopan, Jalisco. He is wounded in a shootout during the operation and is wanted on a Michoacán warrant for aggravated homicide.

== Arts and literature ==
- Toxic: A Fairy Tale for Grown-Ups

== Deaths ==
- January 8: Tadamasa Goto, 83, Japanese crime boss.
- February 22: Nemesio Oseguera Cervantes, 59, Mexican drug lord, leader of the Jalisco New Generation Cartel (since 2010), shot.
- February 23: Hugo César Macías Ureña, Mexican cartel member (Jalisco New Generation Cartel), shot.
- March 2: Benedetto Santapaola, 87, Italian mobster from Catania.
- March 5: Bobby Cummines, 74, English gangster.
- April 26: Giuseppe Commisso, 79, Italian mobster.
- May 21: Vincenzo Santapaola, 56, Italian mobster (Sicilian Mafia).
- August 26: Domenico Papalia, 81, Italian mobster ('Ndrangheta).
- October 10: Freddie Foreman, 94, English gangster.
- November 15: Miguel Ángel Félix Gallardo, 80, Mexican drug lord.

== See also ==
- Timeline of the Mexican drug war
- Timeline of organized crime
