= 2017 in organized crime =

In 2017, a number of events took place in organized crime. The Mexican drug war continued to be a focus throughout the year.

== Events ==
=== January ===
- January 18 – At least four people are killed in a shootout between Mexican Police and unknown gunmen after the latter opened fire on the Quintana Roo state attorneys' office in Cancún.
- January 19 – Mexican drug lord Joaquín "El Chapo" Guzmán is extradited to the United States, where he will face charges for his role as leader of the Sinaloa Cartel.

=== April ===
- April 5 – Mexican Beltrán Leyva Cartel drug lord Alfredo Beltrán Leyva is sentenced to life in prison and ordered to forfeit $US529,200,000.

=== May ===
- May 15 – An unknown gunman shoots and kills veteran journalist Javier Valdez Cárdenas, who is noted for his investigative reporting on Mexico's war on drugs, in Culiacán, Sinaloa.

=== July ===
- July 5 – A gunfight between La Línea gang members and a rival cartel in Madera Municipality, Chihuahua, leaves at least 14 people dead.

== Arts and literature ==
- Gangster Land

== Deaths ==
- January 13 – Nicodemo Scarfo, 87, American mobster, boss of the Philadelphia crime family (1981–1991).
- April 19 – Yip Kai Foon, 55, Hong Kong gangster.
- July 2 – Bert Rossi, 94, English gangster.
- August 21 – Ron Previte, 73, American gangster.
- November 17 – Salvatore Riina, 87, Italian mobster, capo of the Sicilian Mafia.

== See also ==
- Timeline of the Mexican drug war
- Timeline of organized crime
