= 2016 in organized crime =

In 2016, a number of events took place in organized crime. The Mexican drug war continued to be a focus throughout the year.

== Events ==
=== January ===
- January 2 – Gisela Mota Ocampo, mayor of Temixco in Mexico's Morelos state is assassinated by gunmen at her home, less than a day after taking office. Morelos Governor, Graco Ramírez, attributed Mota's killing to organized crime, without citing a particular drug cartel or gang.
- January 3 – Two suspects are killed in a clash with police, and three others are arrested in connection with the previous days assassination of Temixco, Morelos's newly inaugurated mayor Gisela Mota Ocampo. Governor Graco Ramírez, who attributed Mota's killing to organized crime, calls for three days of mourning.
- January 7 – The bodies of six people are found in a rural village in Guerrero state in southern Mexico.
- January 8 – The Mexican Navy recaptures escaped drug lord Joaquín Guzmán, also known as "El Chapo", in Los Mochis, Sinaloa.
- January 10 – Mexican authorities announce the intention to question American actor Sean Penn and Mexican actress Kate del Castillo regarding a secret October meeting and interview with Joaquín Guzmán, published by Rolling Stone magazine the previous day. Mexico Attorney General Arely Gomez says it was the Penn interview that led authorities to a Guzman hiding place.

=== March ===
- March 8 – Acting on requests from neighboring Italy, Swiss authorities arrest 15 people sought as suspected members of the 'Ndrangheta organized crime syndicate, a Mafia-type organization centered in Calabria, Italy.
- March 14 – At least nine suspected cartel members are killed in gunfights with government forces during an anti-cartel operation in the city of Reynosa, Mexico.

=== April ===
- April 25 – Mexican police come under attack in a two-hour gunfight in the city of Acapulco, killing one gunman. At the same time, a separate group of gunmen attacked a federal police base in the city.

=== May ===
- May 20 – The Mexican government approves the extradition of drug boss Joaquín Guzmán to the United States following assurances that he will not face the death penalty.
- May 27 – The legal team of Joaquín Guzmán (El Chapo), the leader of the Sinaloa Cartel, challenges the foreign ministry of Mexico's decision to extradite him to the United States.
- May 29 – Mexican international football player Alan Pulido, who was playing for Olympiacos F.C., is kidnapped by masked men near his home in Ciudad Victoria, Tamaulipas. He is later rescued.

=== September ===
- September 7 – A gang shoots down a police helicopter near Apatzingán, Michoacán, killing four people. The police had been conducting an operation against criminal groups and drug cartels.
- September 19 – Mexican authorities find the bodies of two priests who were kidnapped the previous day in Poza Rica, Veracruz. Authorities find the third abducted person, the driver, alive.

=== October ===
- October 19 – The Attorney General of Mexico issues an arrest warrant for the former Governor of Veracruz, Javier Duarte, for suspected involvement in organized crime and money laundering.

=== December ===
- December 5 – Police report 14 suspected criminals, who attacked a police patrol, are killed in a gunbattle with police and Mexican Marines in Veracruz, Mexico. An unknown number fled.

== Arts and literature ==
- Live by Night
- Rumble
- The Infiltrator

== Deaths ==
- May 27 – Rocco Sollecito, 67, Italian-born Canadian gangster (Rizzuto crime family)
- July 13 – Bernardo Provenzano, 83, Italian criminal, head of the (Corleonesi Mafia faction)
- October 30 – René Velázquez Valenzuela, Mexican suspected hitman, leader of the Sinaloa Cartel

== See also ==
- Timeline of the Mexican drug war
- Timeline of organized crime
