= Grupo de Operaciones Especiales (Mexico) =

Military unit

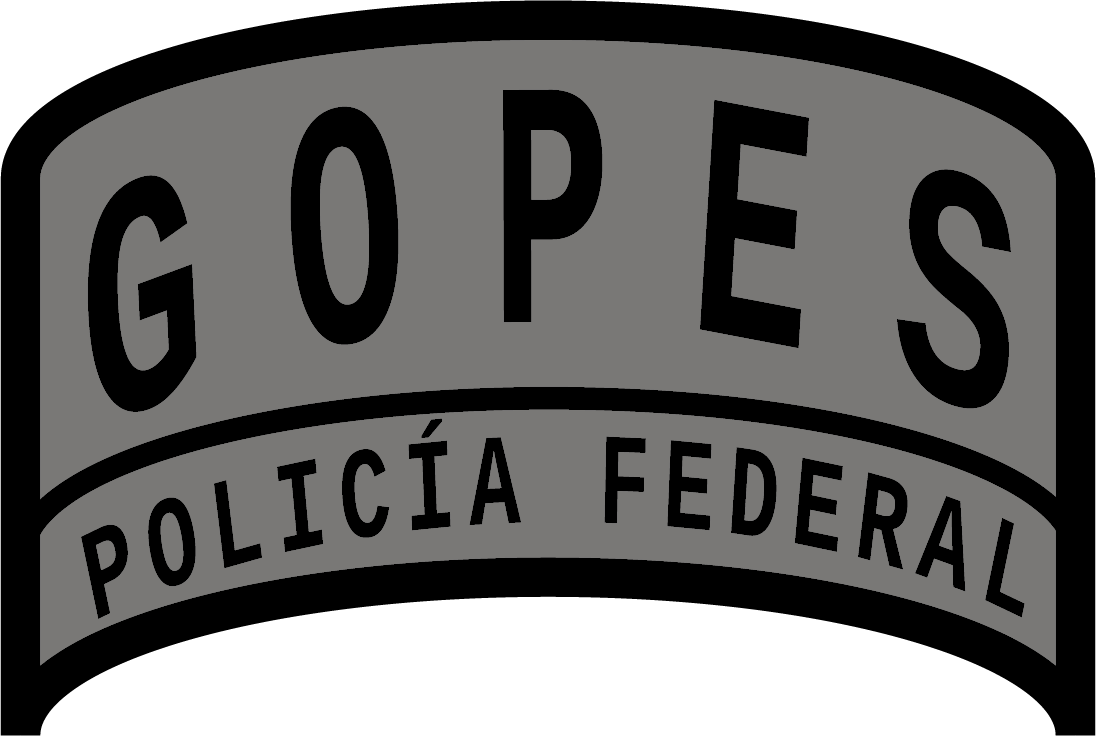
- Country: Mexico
- Agency: Policia Federal
- Type: Police tactical unit
- Role: Counter-terrorism; Law enforcement
- Abbreviation: GOPES

The Grupo de Operaciones Especiales (GOPES) (English: Special Operations Group) was the police tactical unit of the Federal Police of Mexico.

In October 2019, the Federal Police were disbanded, and its personnel and equipment were transferred to the newly formed National Guard. In August 2022, the National Guard formed a new tactical unit called Fuerza Especial de Reacción e Intervención (FERI).

== Specialization ==
Their mission was to carry out a variety of operations such as:

- Counter-narcotics and drug cartels
- Counterterrorism
- Executive protection
- Fight organized crime.
- Hostage rescue
- Raiding for search and capture high-value targets.
- Serving highly arrest dangerous criminals and search warrants.
- Subduing suspects and engaging heavily armed criminals.
- Suppress insurgents in all terrains by infiltrating air, land, and water.

It had 87 members, divided into groups of 8 to 12 operators.

== Training ==
The GOPES is a well-trained force which took courses from the following forces:

- Mexico: GAFE
- Mexico: Marine Airborne Battalion of the Mexican Navy
- Spain: GEO
- Colombia: AFEUR
- France: RAID
- USA: FAMS
- Brazil: BOPE

== Firearms ==
Assault rifle

- Belgium: FN SCAR
- Belgium: FN F2000
- Italy: Beretta ARX-160
- Israel: IWI Tavor
- USA: M4 carbine

Grenade launcher

- USA: M203 grenade launcher
- South Africa: Milkor MGL

Machine guns

- Germany: Heckler & Koch MG4
- USA: Browning M2
- Israel: IWI Negev

SMG

- Germany: Heckler & Koch MP5
- Germany: Heckler & Koch UMP
- Germany: Heckler & Koch MP7

Sniper rifle

- USA: Barrett M82
- USA: Barrett M98B
- USA: Remington 700
- Germany: DSR-50

Shotguns

- USA: Remington 870
- Italy: Benelli M4

Pistols

- Germany: Heckler & Koch USP
- Germany: Walther P99
- USA: Smith & Wesson Model 686
- Belgium: FN Five-seven
- Italy: Beretta PX4 Storm
- Italy: Beretta 92
