= 2013 in organized crime =

In 2013, a number of events took place in organized crime. The Mexican drug war continued to be a focus throughout the year.

== Events ==
=== January ===
- January 3 – Mexican troops kill 12 alleged drug traffickers who opened fire at a checkpoint in La Estación, Zacatecas.
- January 16 – Russian mafia boss Aslan Usoyan is killed in Moscow.

=== February ===
- February 26 – Gunmen break into a prison in the Mexican border city of Ciudad Miguel Alemán, Tamaulipas, and liberate 12 inmates.

=== March ===
- March 14 – Gunmen storm a bar in Cancún, Mexico, and kill 7 people, also 4 others were wounded in the attack. The authorities allege that the victims were part of a taxi union.

=== April ===
- April 25 – Mexican photojournalist Daniel Alejandro Martínez Bazaldúa is found dead in Saltillo, Coahuila, an area where Los Zetas drug cartel operates. With his death, Mexico consolidates itself as one of the most dangerous countries for journalists, where more than 80 have been killed since 2000.

=== May ===
- May 25 – Thousands of people attend the beatification of Pino Puglisi, a Roman Catholic priest murdered by the Sicilian Mafia for speaking out against crime.

=== July ===
- July 14 – The Mexican Army captures Miguel Treviño Morales, a leader of the Los Zetas.
- July 24 – Clashes between the Knights Templar Cartel and the Mexican federal police leave 22 dead in the state of Michoacán. According to government press reports, two of the dead were law enforcement officials, while the rest were cartel gunmen.
- July 30 – The United States Department of the Treasury issues sanctions to three Mexican nationals linked to the Sinaloa Cartel for laundering money for the drug lords Ismael Zambada García and Joaquín Guzmán Loera. The Kingpin Act sanctions prohibit Americans to do any kind of business with them.

=== August ===
- August 9 – Mexican drug lord Rafael Caro Quintero, who was convicted for the 1985 murder of U.S. Drug Enforcement Administration Enrique Camarena, is ordered released from prison.
- August 17 – Gulf Cartel leader Mario Ramírez Treviño is arrested in the state of Tamaulipas.

=== September ===
- September 2 – Mexican forces arrest Alberto Carrillo Fuentes, the alleged leader of the Juárez Cartel.

=== November ===
- November 6 – A Mexican federal court overturns a state court ruling that allowed the drug lord Rafael Caro Quintero to be released from prison earlier this year. This court response follows a decision by the U.S. Department of State to place a $5 million bounty against him.

=== December ===
- December 18 – High-ranking Sinaloa Cartel leader Gonzalo Inzunza Inzunza is killed in a shootout with the Mexican Navy in Puerto Peñasco, Sonora

== Arts and literature ==
- The Family
- Gangster Squad

== Deaths ==
- January 10 – Antonino Calderone, 77, Sicilian Mafioso.
- January 16 – Aslan Usoyan, 75, Georgian-born Russian mobster
- July 25 – Juan David Ochoa Vásquez, 65, Colombian convicted drug lord, co-founder of Medellín cartel,
- September 5 – Maurice Lerner, 77, American Mafia hitman.
- October 5 – Gaetano Fidanzati, 78, crime boss (Sicilian Mafia).
- December 18 – Gonzalo Inzunza Inzunza, 42, Sinaloa Cartel leader
- December 23 – Vito Rizzuto, 67, Canadian mafia leader,

== See also ==
- Timeline of the Mexican drug war
- Timeline of organized crime

== Bibliography ==
=== References ===
- Kelly, Robert J.; Schatzberg, Rufus; Chin, Ko-lin (1994). Handbook of organized crime in the United States (1994 ed.). Greenwood Publishing Group. ISBN 0-313-28366-4.
- Vilalta, C. (2011). "Monthly patterns, trends, and trajectories in the count of deaths related to organized crime, 2006-2010" (PDF). Conference at UAEM (in Spanish), April 26, 2011. Archived from the original (PDF) on 17 August 2011.
