= 2021 in organized crime =

In 2021, a number of events took place in organized crime.

== Events ==
- April 10 – The Venezuelan Armed Forces announce the arrest of an unspecified number of Sinaloa Cartel members amidst clashes with FARC dissidents in the state of Apure.
- May 31 – Corleonesi Mafia hitman Giovanni Brusca is released from prison after serving his 25-year sentence. He was convicted for his role in the Capaci bombing, which killed anti-Mafia magistrate Giovanni Falcone alongside four other people. His release is condemned by the leaders of the ruling Italian Democratic Party and the right-wing Lega Nord.
- September 14 – A Mexican court sentences Vicente Carrillo Fuentes, a former leader of the Juárez drug cartel, to 28 years in prison on the charges of organized crime and drug trafficking.
- October 23 – Colombian police arrest Dario Antonio Úsuga (alias "Otoniel"), a leader of the Clan del Golfo drug cartel, in the town of Necoclí. Úsuga had been listed by authorities as one of the country's most-wanted drug traffickers.
- November 16 – The Mexican Secretariat of National Defense announces that Rosalinda González Valencia, the wife of Jalisco New Generation Cartel leader Nemesio Oseguera "El Mencho" Cervantes, is re-arrested. González was previously detained in 2018 for allegedly running the finances of the cartel, but was released on bail.
- December 1 – Armed cartel members break into a prison in Tula, Hidalgo using vehicles, detonating several car bombs. Nine inmates are freed, including a local drug lord. Two law enforcement officers are injured.

== Arts and literature ==
- The Many Saints of Newark
- Lansky
- Furioza
- Ferry

== Deaths ==
- February 25 – Peter Gotti, 81, American mobster (Gambino crime family).
- June 27 – Dominick Montiglio, 73, American mob associate (Gambino crime family).
- July 7 – Giovanni Tegano, 81, Italian mobster, head of De Stefano 'ndrina.
- August 21 – Anthony Scotto, 87, American mobster (Gambino crime family).
- September 24 – Jitender Mann Gogi, 38, Indian mobster.
- October 1 – Frank LoCascio, 89, American mobster (Gambino crime family).

== See also ==
- Timeline of the Mexican drug war
- Timeline of organized crime
