= 2018 in organized crime =

In 2018, a number of events took place in organized crime.

== Events ==
=== February ===
- February 8 – Mexican authorities arrest American-born Jose Maria Guizar Valencia, the alleged leader of the Zetas drug cartel, as he was entering a hotel in Mexico City's upscale neighborhood of Roma.

=== March ===
- March 3 – Murder of Ján Kuciak: On the day of the funeral of slain journalist Ján Kuciak, for lack of evidence, police release seven Italian nationals who are accused of links with the 'Ndrangheta mafia in a posthumously published investigative report by Kuciak.

=== April ===
- April 10 – An Italian judge says a mafia clan has been plotting the murder of Spia.it journalist Paolo Borrometi. Italian prime minister Paolo Gentiloni voices his support to the journalist.

=== May ===
- May 27 – Mexican authorities arrest Rosalinda Garcia, the wife of Jalisco New Generation Cartel leader Nemesio Oseguera Cervantes, one of the country's most wanted drug lords.

=== August ===
- August 16 – The Mexican government announces that they are offering up to MXN$30 million (equivalent to US$1.56 million) for anyone who provides information that leads to the arrest of Nemesio Oseguera Cervantes (alias "El Mencho"), the suspected leader of the Jalisco New Generation Cartel and one of Mexico's most-wanted.

=== September ===
- September 6 – Mexican officials report the discovery of the remains of at least 166 people in a mass grave in Veracruz.

=== December ===
- December 4 – The alleged boss of the Cosa Nostra mafia clan is arrested along with 45 suspected accomplices in the province of Palermo, Italy. They are accused of aggravated extortion.

== Arts and literature ==
- The Mule
- The Outsider
- Gotti
- King of Thieves

== Deaths ==
- August 15 – Rita Borsellino, 73, Italian anti-Mafia activist and politician, MEP (2009–2014).
- October 23 – Nicola Lapenta, 92, Italian politician, MP (1972–1987), President of the Antimafia Commission (1983).
- November 18 – Héctor Beltrán Leyva, 56, Mexican drug cartel leader (Beltrán-Leyva Cartel).

== See also ==
- Timeline of the Mexican drug war
- Timeline of organized crime
