= 2021 Rohini Court shooting =

Assassination in India

On 24 September 2021, the Indian gangster Jitender Mann Gogi was reportedly shot dead by two men inside courtroom 207 of the Rohini Court Complex situated in the North-West Delhi district of Delhi, the capital city of India.

The shooting, which resulted in the death of Gogi, and the two assailants, who were shot dead by the police, drew significant criticism on the security at the court. The Rohini Court Complex houses the subordinate court establishments of two districts, North-West Delhi and North Delhi, and on the day of the shooting, sixty eight courts were functioning from the complex.

Within minutes of the shooting, video footages depicting a chaotic atmosphere just outside courtroom 207, with gunshots being heard in the background, went viral on social media platforms. Immediately after the incident, there was considerable uproar and outrage at the manner in which the incident unfolded, as Gogi was reportedly being produced by the police at the court, and the two assailants, who shot him during the functioning of the court, had entered the courtroom in lawyers' attire, having carried the weapons with them inside court complex without any checking or frisking. The incident drew public attention on the general security arrangement at the different court complexes in Delhi, and at Rohini Court Complex specifically.
