= 2023 in organized crime =

In 2023, a number of events took place in organized crime.

== Events ==
- January 16 –
  - Six people, including a baby, are killed in a mass shooting in Goshen, California, United States. The shooting is believed to have been perpetrated by cartel members.
  - Mafia boss Matteo Messina Denaro, one of the most wanted men in Italy and Europe, is arrested in Palermo, Sicily, after 30 years on the run.
- March 9 – Mexico's Gulf Cartel surrenders five purported perpetrators of a kidnapping of four U.S. citizens that occurred a few days prior in Matamoros, Tamaulipas, and offers an apology to the victims, their families, and society in general.
- May 10 – Four people are killed during clashes at the Pharr–Reynosa International Bridge, on the Mexico–United States border, between police and suspected cartel members.
- July 11 – Suspected drug cartel members set off bombs targeting police officers in Tlajomulco de Zúñiga, Jalisco, Mexico, killing six people (four officers and two civilians) and injuring 12 others.
- August 22 – The Mexican Army says that drug cartels have increased usage of improvised explosive devices, with 42 soldiers, police and suspects wounded this year.
- August 28 – The Mexican government says that it has deployed 1,200 more troops to the Mexican state of Michoacán after drug cartel violence was reported over the weekend.
- September 27 – Authorities in the Mexican state of Nuevo León find at least twelve bodies dumped on roads near Monterrey, likely related to a drug cartel operating in Tamaulipas.
- September 30 – Two Morena party pollsters are killed and a third is kidnapped in Juárez, Chiapas, Mexico. A note was left on the bodies from the Jalisco New Generation Cartel, threatening the government.
- November 23 – The security chief for El Chapo's Sinaloa Cartel Nestor Isidro Pérez Salas, also known as "El Nini", is arrested in Culiacán, Sinaloa, Mexico. The United States Drug Enforcement Administration had a $3 million bounty for El Nini's arrest.
- December 12 – Six gunmen from the Sinaloa Cartel and Jalisco New Generation Cartel were killed after an encounter between criminal factions, in the locality of Boquilla del Carmen, municipality of Villanueva Zacatecas. Police and soldiers also find two people wounded, as well as one armed suspect and guns and a grenade.
- December 13 – Six people are killed and two others are injured in a shootout between rival drug cartels in Villanueva, Zacatecas. After the encounter, authorities arrest a suspect and decommissions five assault rifles, grenades and ammunition.
- December 28 – La Familia Michoacana drug cartel kidnap 14 people from Texcaltitlán, state of Mexico, in retaliation for a previous incident in which 10 cartel members were killed by residents of the town.
- December 29 – Six people are killed and 26 others are injured in a mass shooting at a party in Ciudad Obregón, Sonora, Mexico. The shooting's target, a cartel member, is among those killed.

== Arts and literature ==
- Mob Land
- Inside Man
- The Equalizer 3
- Mafia Mamma

== Deaths ==
- February 23 – Giuseppe Nirta, 82, Italian mobster.
- September 25 – Matteo Messina Denaro, 61, Italian mobster, head of the Sicilian Mafia (since 2006).
- October 3 – Thomas Gambino, 94, American mobster (Gambino crime family).
- October 5 – Francesco Matrone, 76, Italian mobster (Camorra).
- October 14 – Rosetta Cutolo, 86, Italian mobster (NCO).
- October 21 – Vincent Asaro, 86, American mobster (Bonanno crime family).
- November 17 – Gregory Woolley, 51, Haitian-born Canadian mobster (Hells Angels).
- December 27 – Jackie D'Amico, 87, American mobster (Gambino crime family).

== See also ==
- Timeline of the Mexican drug war
- Timeline of organized crime
