= 2025 in organized crime =

In 2025, a number of events took place in organized crime.

== Events ==
- January 17 – Nine people are killed during a shootout between Gulf Cartel gunmen and the National Liberation Army (ELN) in Montelibano, Córdoba Department, Colombia.
- January 31 – An improvised explosive device left by cartel members detonates in San Fernando, Tamaulipas, Mexico, killing two villagers and injuring a third.
- February 4 – A series of shootouts and encounters are reported in Nuevo Laredo, Tamaulipas, Mexico, after the arrest of the regional leader of the Cártel del Noreste and leader of an armed wing in the state. The United States Consulate in Mexico issues an alert for its citizens to not go out on the streets, and the Nuevo Laredo International Airport suspends activities due to the violence.
- February 9 – At least five bodies are abandoned under a bridge near Cárdenas, Salamanca, Guanajuato, Mexico. A banner allegedly signed by the Santa Rosa de Lima Cartel was found at the crime scene.
- February 11 – Italian police arrest around 150 people across Sicily in the biggest anti-Mafia raid since 1984.
- February 28 – Mexico extradites 29 alleged cartel members to the United States, including Rafael Caro Quintero, Miguel Treviño Morales, Omar Treviño Morales, Vicente Carrillo Fuentes and Jose Rodolfo Villarreal-Hernandez.
- April 29 – Alejandro Gertz Manero, Attorney General of Mexico, concluded that the Izaguirre Ranch was used by the Jalisco New Generation Cartel as a recruitment camp between 2021 and 2024, but found no evidence that it served as an extermination site.
- April 30 – The Colombian government says fifteen police officers and twelve soldiers have been killed over the past two weeks in targeted attacks by the Gulf Clan cartel and other armed groups.
- May 6 – Five gunmen are killed and six vehicles burned, after an encounter between Cártel del Noreste and Jalisco New Generation Cartel´s which took place in the Rayones, Nuevo León, México.
- May 20 – Seven people are killed, including minors, in a mass shooting by Santa Rosa de Lima Cartel gunmen in San Felipe, Guanajuato, Mexico.
- May 30 – Nine alleged members of the Los Metros drug cartel are arrested by Mexican law enforcement on suspicion of the abduction and murder of the musical group Grupo Fugitivo who disappeared in Reynosa, Tamaulipas.
- June 2 – Five police officers are killed after an ambush in a highway in the border municipality of Frontera Comalapa. Hours later, an attacker was arrested and authorities confirmed that the attack was a retaliation for the recent arrest of Aler Baldomero Samayoa Recinos, also known as “Chicharra,” leader of Los Huistas, a Guatemalan criminal group that established ties with both the Sinaloa Cartel and the CJNG.
- June 9 – The U.S. Treasury Department imposes sanctions on Iván Archivaldo Guzmán Salazar and his brother Jesús Alfredo Guzmán Salazar, El Chapo's sons who are believed to be in Mexico and leading factions of the Sinaloa Cartel.
- June 26 – Ecuadorian president Daniel Noboa announces the recapture of José Adolfo Macías Villamar, the leader of the Los Choneros cartel and Ecuador's most wanted criminal, in Manta, Manabí Province, after he disappeared from a prison last year.
- June 30 – Twenty bodies, five of them decapitated, are found either hanging from a bridge or inside a van abandoned beneath, near Culiacán, Sinaloa, amid clashes between factions of the Sinaloa Cartel.
- July 20 – Ecuador extradites José Adolfo Macías Villamar, leader of the Los Choneros cartel, to the United States where he faces federal charges related to drug trafficking.
- July 27 – Seventeen people are killed and 14 others are injured after gunmen open fire on a bar in El Empalme, Ecuador. The shooting is believed to be linked to a conflict between local drug cartels for control of drug trafficking routes.
- August 8 – U.S. president Donald Trump signs an executive order commanding the U.S. military and other sectors of the federal government to take action against Latin American drug cartels designated as terrorist organisations, such as Tren de Aragua and MS-13.
- August 19 – Six severed heads are discovered on a road that links the states of Puebla and Tlaxcala in Mexico. The La Barredora cartel is suspected to be behind the attack.
- August 21 – U.S. president Donald Trump deploys three guided-missile destroyers off the coast of Venezuela after the U.S. government authorized military operations against Latin American drug cartels, prompting an escalation of tensions between the United States and Venezuela.
- August 25 – Former Mexican drug lord and Sinaloa Cartel top leader Ismael "El Mayo" Zambada pleads guilty to drug trafficking charges in the United States.
- September 2 – The United States military conducts a precision strike and sinks a Venezuelan boat reportedly used by Tren de Aragua for smuggling drugs in the Caribbean Sea, killing 11 people.
- September 4 – The United States designates Ecuadorian drug cartels Los Choneros and Los Lobos as terrorist organizations. U.S. secretary of state Marco Rubio also says that the U.S. will support the Ecuadorian Navy by providing $6 million in drones and $13 million for general security in the fight against these gangs.
- September 5 –
  - The Trump administration deploys ten F-35 fighter jets to Puerto Rico to take part in military action against drug cartels in Venezuela and Latin America.
  - Venezuelan president Nicolás Maduro accuses the U.S. of seeking a regime change in Venezuela under the guise of combating cartels.
- September 7 – Forty-five Colombian soldiers are kidnapped by a mob in Cauca Department, Colombia, while conducting anti-drug cartel operations. The military says the soldiers are being held hostage by local villagers who are demanding the return of a killed insurgent's body which was transferred to a morgue in Popayán in return for their release.
- September 15 – United States president Donald Trump claims that the U.S. military carried out a strike on an alleged Venezuelan drug cartel vessel in international waters, killing three people, making it the second such strike carried out against a suspected drug boat in September.
- October 6 – The United States Treasury issues sanctions against various Mexican companies, including those in the pharmaceutical, real estate, chemical, and cleaning sectors, and eight people who manage them for allegedly supplying drug precursors to the Chapitos faction of the Sinaloa Cartel.
- October 23 – More than 30 people are arrested by United States law enforcement as part of an investigation into illegal gambling linked to the American mafia, including former professional basketball player Damon Jones, Miami Heat player Terry Rozier, and Portland Trail Blazers head coach Chauncey Billups.
- October 24 –
  - Six people are killed in a U.S. missile strike on a suspected drug-running boat in the Caribbean Sea.
  - The United States deploys the USS Gerald R. Ford carrier battle group to Latin America for counter-drug cartel operations.
- November 18 – The Spanish National Police Corps, in coordination with the U.S. Drug Enforcement Administration, dismantle a Jalisco New Generation Cartel logistics office in Spain, arresting 20 people, including two members of the Italian Camorra organization.
- November 24 – The United States formally declares Cartel of the Suns, an umbrella designation for Venezuelan Armed Forces officials allegedly involved in the drug trade, as a Foreign Terrorist Organization.
- December 16 – The U.S. State Department designates Colombian cartel and neo-paramilitary group Clan del Golfo as a foreign terrorist organization.

== Arts and literature ==
- Den of Thieves 2
- Mafia: The Old Country

== Deaths ==
- May 11 – John Barbato, 90, American mobster (Genovese crime family).
- May 29 – Francesco Mallardo, 74, Italian mobster (Mallardo clan).
- December 23 – Zeferino Peña Cuéllar, Mexican drug lord (Gulf Cartel), shot.

== See also ==
- Timeline of the Mexican drug war
- Timeline of organized crime
