= Richard Calabro =

Richard Calabro (born 14 April 1979) is a Yorkshire born actor who began his career in the children's TV drama The Ward, playing 'prankster' Digger Reily, until the character was eventually written out of the series in 1992. More recently, Calabro starred with Angela Griffiths in award-winning hospital drama Holby City.

Some other television credits include: Woof!, Mike & Angelo, Press Gang, Rosemary and Thyme, The Bill, Band of Gold, Mother Love, Casualty, My Hero, Emmerdale, Doctors, Seven Sisters, Seven Brothers, Macbeth (BBC 2001), Taggart, Caitlin's Way (HBO), A Touch of Frost, Little Boy Lost and Lear's Children.

Calabro made his stage debut in Boy George's hit musical Taboo in 2002 and also starred in the same show on the U.K No 1 tour in 2003.

== Selected Appearances ==
1. Holby City
2. Taggart
3. The Bill
4. Caitlin's Way
5. Life Support
6. A Touch of Frost
7. Band of Gold
8. Casualty
9. Woof!
10. Press Gang
11. Children's Ward
12. Mother Love
