= Byron Vlahakis =

American mobster (1932–2015)

Byron J. Vlahakis
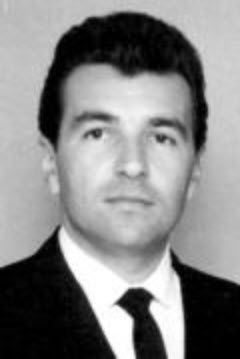
- Born: Byron James Vlahakis; August 9, 1932; Lowell, Massachusetts, U.S.
- Died: December 5, 2015 (aged 83); Boston, Massachusetts, U.S.
- Resting place: Westlawn I Cemetery, Lowell, Massachusetts, U.S.
- Occupation: Mobster
- Spouse: Elaine "Susie" (Dokos) Vlahakis
- Allegiance: Winter Hill Gang
- Convictions: Gaming (1967); Gaming (1981); Gaming (1987); Gaming (1993)

Byron James Vlahakis (August 9, 1932 – December 5, 2015) was an American mobster who was a member of the Winter Hill Gang in Somerville, Massachusetts. Vlahakis was the leader of a $10 million-a-year gaming syndicate that dominated organized crime in Lowell, Merrimack Valley and spanned throughout Eastern Massachusetts that had direct ties to the Providence, Rhode Island–based Patriarca Mafia family.

== Early life ==
Byron Vlahakis was born in Lowell, Massachusetts on August 9, 1932. His father, James “Demetrios” A. “Apostolos” Vlahakis a bootlegger in the prohibition days was one of the earliest organized crime figures in New England history, who immigrated from Sparta Greece as a boy settling with his family in Lowell’s Acer. His Mother, Anna (Cutsulianos) Vlahakis born May 14, 1903, in Sparta Greece. Died July 28, 1964. Byron attended grammar school at the Bartlett School in Lowell, Massachusetts. He was a graduate of Lowell High School, Class of 1950. He also attended Boston University for one year. He served in the United States Army during the Korean War and had been a Military Police Officer stationed in Vienna, Austria.

== Criminal career ==
From 1960s until the 1990s, Vlahakis was a reputed member of the notorious Winter Hill Gang in Somerville, Massachusetts. He was the leader of a $10 million-a-year gaming syndicate that dominated organized crime in Lowell, Merrimack Valley and spanned throughout Eastern Massachusetts that had direct ties to the Providence, Rhode Island faction of the Patriarca crime family.

Unlike other celebrity gangsters, like the flamboyant James “Whitey” Bulger or Joseph "the Animal" Barboza, Vlahakis kept a low profile. This may explain why, in his three decades of organized crime, he didn’t do much jail time. He was arrested on gaming charges in 1967, but the charges were dropped for lack of prosecution. In 1981, he was arrested again on gaming charges, and found guilty, and fined.

In the 1970s, Vlahakis "laid off" the gang’s bets on rigged horse races as a part of a race-fixing scheme, along with other members of the Winter Hill Gang. In 1979, members of the Winter Hill Gang were arrested and indicted on federal "horse race fixing" charges. While Vlahakis himself had escaped conviction, his associates were not as fortunate; Winter Hill Gang boss Howie Winter, James M. Martorano and his brother John V. Martorano, and Joe McDonald were implicated.

Others indicted were: Melvin Goldenberg, Douglas Morello, and Elliot Paul Price of Las Vegas; Richard Donati, Robert Owen, and Robert Duda. The owners were identified as Charles DeMetri, and James DeMetri. The jockeys, in addition to Norman Mercier, were Guy Contrada, and Ed Donnelly.

In 1993, Vlahakis was found guilty of running a $10 million-a-year gambling syndicate, and faced a maximum sentence of 15 years in state prison. However, he was sentenced to house arrest for one year, and was also ordered to pay $22,500 in fines.
