= 2014 in organized crime =

In 2014, a number of events took place in organized crime. The Mexican drug war continued to be a focus throughout the year.

== Events ==
=== January ===
- January 3 – Authorities confirm the arrest of El Chino Ántrax, a high-ranking Sinaloa Cartel leader, in the Netherlands.
- January 8 – The U.S. Department of the Treasury sanctions the Sinaloa Cartel enforcer El Chino Ántrax under the Foreign Narcotics Kingpin Designation Act, which virtually prohibits U.S. citizens from conducting any financial deal with the drug lord and freezes his assets.
- January 14 – Communitary forces take several towns in Mexican state of Michoacán trying to expel the Knights Templar Cartel forces, and prompting the intervention of Mexican Army against them.
- January 15 – Italy says that it will use the Italian Army against the mafia who are accused of dumping toxic waste in Naples.
- January 21 – One of the founders of Los Zetas drug cartel, Rogelio González Pizaña, is sentenced to 16 years in prison.
- January 27 – A New York federal district court seeks the extradition of Los Zetas drug cartel leader Miguel Treviño Morales, arrested in July 2013.

=== February ===
- February 20 – Mexican authorities arrest Jesús Peña (alias "El 20"), the leader of Los Ántrax, an armed squadron of the Sinaloa Cartel. Peña was part of Ismael "El Mayo" Zambada's inner circle and the successor of El Chino Ántrax.
- February 22 – The Sinaloa cartel drug lord Joaquín Guzmán Loera, also known as "El Chapo", is arrested in Mexico.

=== March ===
- March 9 – Mexican authorities confirm that Nazario Moreno González, the top leader of the Knights Templar Cartel, was killed in the state of Michoacán.
- March 31 – The Mexican Navy kills Knights Templar Cartel high-ranking leader Enrique Plancarte Solís.

=== May ===
- May 12 – Galindo Mellado Cruz, one of the founding members of the Los Zetas, and four other armed men are killed in a shootout with Mexican security forces after they raided Cruz's hideout in the city of Reynosa.
- May 28 – Dutch authorities approve the extradition of high-ranking Sinaloa Cartel leader José Rodrigo Aréchiga Gamboa (alias "El Chino Ántrax") to the United States.

=== June ===
- June 24 – Tijuana Cartel leader Luis Fernando Sánchez Arellano is arrested by the Mexican Army in Tijuana, Baja California.

=== October ===
- October 9 – Alleged Mexican drug lord Vicente Carrillo Fuentes is captured in the city of Torreon.

=== November ===
- November 17 – Former Beltrán Leyva Cartel leader Alfredo Beltrán Leyva is extradited to the United States from Mexico, facing drug trafficking and money laundering offenses.

=== December ===
- December 3 – Italian police arrest a mix of mafia gangsters, corrupt politicians, and one former terrorist in a corruption scandal exploiting migrants.

== Arts and literature ==
- Rob the Mob
- Sabotage

== Deaths ==
- January 6 – Frank Illiano, 86, American criminal (Genovese crime family)
- March 9 – Nazario Moreno González, 44, Mexican drug lord
- March 31 – Enrique Plancarte Solís, 43, Mexican drug lord
- May 9 – Galindo Mellado Cruz, 41, Mexican drug lord, a founder of Los Zetas
- July 14 – Jack Tocco, 87, American mafioso, head of the Detroit Partnership, suspect in the Jimmy Hoffa disappearance
- July 26 – Raúl Hernández Barrón, 37, Mexican drug lord
- October 3 – George DeCicco, 84, American mobster

== See also ==
- Timeline of the Mexican drug war
- Timeline of organized crime

== Bibliography ==
=== References ===
- Kelly, Robert J.; Schatzberg, Rufus; Chin, Ko-lin (1994). Handbook of organized crime in the United States (1994 ed.). Greenwood Publishing Group. ISBN 0-313-28366-4.
- Vilalta, C. (2011). "Monthly patterns, trends, and trajectories in the count of deaths related to organized crime, 2006-2010" (PDF). Conference at UAEM (in Spanish), April 26, 2011. Archived from the original (PDF) on 17 August 2011.
