= Nicola Lapenta =

Italian politician (1926–2018)

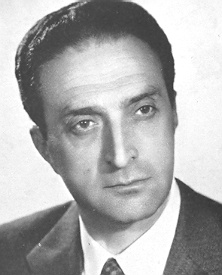

Senator of the Italian Republic
- In office 5 July 1976 – 1 July 1987
- Constituency: Basilicata

Member of Italian Chamber of Deputies
- In office 25 May 1972 – 4 July 1976
- Constituency: Potenza

Personal details
- Born: March 9, 1926; Corleto Perticara, Basilicata, Italy
- Died: October 23, 2018 (aged 92); Rome, Italy
- Political party: Christian Democrat
- Profession: Lawyer

Nicola Lapenta (9 March 1926 – 23 October 2018) was an Italian Christian Democrat politician.

== Biography ==
Lapenta was born in Corleto Perticara in the province of Potenza. In 1948 he graduated in law and later worked as a provincial lawyer.

He was president of the province of Potenza from 1967 to 1972, after which he would go on to serve in the Italian Parliament. He was elected MP among the ranks of the Christian Democracy for four consecutive legislatures (VI, VII, VIII, IX), from 1972 to 1987; in 1972 he was elected into the Chamber of Deputies in the constituency of Potenza, while in 1976, in 1979 and in 1983 he was elected to the Italian Senate in the Basilicata region.

During the VIII legislature, he was elected vice-president of the parliamentary commission of inquiry on the massacre in Via Fani, on the kidnapping and murder of Aldo Moro and on terrorism in Italy (1980–1983); he was also president of the parliamentary Antimafia Commission since 23 January 1983 to 11 July 1983.

His career was marked by his opposition to the Mafia.

He died in Rome on October 23, 2018.
