= 1890s in organized crime =

This is a list of organized crime in the 1890s, arranged chronologically.

== 1890 ==
=== Events ===
==== China ====
- The Catholic Church in Lungshui, Sichuan province is attacked by a mob of 30,000 people. Supposedly supported by the Big Sword and White Lotus Societies, the attack would be the last of the societies' anti-foreigner campaigns as several of their leaders are executed and the remaining members return to daily lives.

==== United States ====
- January 25 – After the capture of two burglars the previous week in Elizabethtown, New Jersey, police close in on the remaining members of the Oak Street Gang who had been committing burglary over the past several months in the city of New Haven, Connecticut arresting five more members.
- May 5 – Members of the Provenzano faction of the New Orleans Mafia ambush several longshoremen belonging to the Matranga faction, wounding three members of the Matrangas, including Anthony "Tony" Matranga (who eventually will have his leg amputated).
- October 15 – New Orleans Police Chief David C. Hennessy is shot by unknown assailants, believed to be an Italian extortionist organization, while investigating a gang war between rival factions. Claiming that "the dagoes did it," the critically wounded Hennessey is taken to the hospital where he dies the next day (Oct. 16). His murder and the acquittal of 17 suspects cause a lynch mob to storm the jail house and hang 11 of the men on March 14, 1891. The later anti-Italian riots would leave a long lasting resentment toward immigrants for decades.
- December 22 - Frank Lyons is pardoned by Louisiana Governor Francis T. Nicholls and again re-forms the Yellow Henry Gang.

=== Births ===
- Joseph Zucker, New York-Cleveland liaison and New York racketeer

=== Deaths ===
- October 16 – David C. Hennessy, New Orleans police chief

== 1891 ==
=== Events ===
- March 14 – After the acquittal/mistrial (on the previous evening) of Charles Matranga and eight of his associates for conspiracy in the murder of New Orleans Police Chief David C. Hennessy, a lynch mob enters the jail and murders 11 of the 19 suspects in the murder. Matranga himself survives by hiding within the prison. For the first time the possibility of an Italian secret criminal organization operating in New Orleans is discussed in the United States. A New Orleans grand jury investigating the incident would later report:

...our research has developed the existence of the secret organization styled 'Mafia'.... Officers of the Mafia and many of its members were not known. Among them are men born in this city of Italian origin.... The larger number of the society is composed of Italians and Sicilians.

=== Births ===
- Joe Aiello (Giuseppe Aiello), Chicago and New York mobster and president of the Unione Siciliane.
- Ruggiero Boiardo (Richie Boiardo), Genovese crime family caporegime (New Jersey) and Abner Zwillman associate.
- Jack Dragna, Los Angeles Mafia Don.
- Owney "The Killer" Madden, New York Prohibition gangster
- Stefano Magaddino, "The Undertaker" Buffalo Mafia Don.
- January 26 – Frank Costello (Francesco Castiglia) "The Prime Minister", National Crime Syndicate and later Cosa Nostra member.

=== Deaths ===
Eleven people were lynched on March 14, 1891, for their alleged role in the murder of David Hennessy, which was widely believed at the time to be a Mafia assassination. This claim has since been disputed by some historians. Several of the lynch victims had been tried and acquitted, and some had not been tried. See March 14, 1891 lynchings.

== 1892 ==
=== Events ===
- May 19 - Frank Lyons is convicted of the murder of police officer John Hurley.

=== Births ===
- Joseph C. Amberg, New York (Brooklyn) gangster
- Alphonse "The Peacemaker" Attardi, New York mobster and government informant
- Antonio "The Scourge" Lombardo, Unione Siciliane leader and Chicago Outfit consigliere
- William "Wild Bill" Lovett, White Hand Gang leader
- Dean O'Banion, Chicago North Side Gang leader

== 1893 ==
=== Events ===
- August 24 - A gambling den belonging to "Big Jim" O'Leary is raided and thirteen suspects, including O'Leary, are arrested.

=== Arts and literature ===
- If Christ Came to Chicago (non-fiction book) by William Thomas Stead

=== Births ===
- Fred "Killer" Burke, Egan's Rats member and freelance hitman
- John C. Montana, Magaddino crime family member
- Frank Scalice, Anastasia crime family underboss
- Frankie Yale, Brooklyn Prohibition gangster

== 1894 ==
=== Events ===
- August 31 - New York police lieutenant William S. "Big Bill" Devery is dismissed from the New York police force as head of the 11th Ward vice districts after the Lexow Investigation Committee find evidence of corruption and graft. Much of the evidence obtained by committee is from Rev. Charles H. Parkhurst, leader of the New York Society for the Prevention of Crime, revealing the extent of Tammany Hall's influence within the NYPD. Other officials charged with corruption and graft would include Alexander "Clubber" Williams.
- The On Leong Merchant Association, a Tong organization, is formed in Boston, Massachusetts.

=== Births ===
- David Beck, Teamster's Union President
- Willie Moretti, Abner Zwillman enforcer and New Jersey Prohibition gangster
- Jacob Orgen, New York gangster and labor union racketeer

== 1895 ==
=== Events ===
- The first barrel murders are discovered in New York.
- The Unione Siciliana, a fraternal organization providing support for Sicilian immigrants, is officially established in Chicago, Illinois.
- Sicilian Don Giuseppe Balsamo, supposedly the first American "Godfather", immigrates to the United States arriving in New York from Sicily. He eventually establishes criminal operations in several Italian neighborhoods of Brooklyn.
- Frank Costello arrives with his family in New York. Settling on 108th Street, his family begins running a small grocery store.
- James Colosimo immigrates to Chicago, Illinois from Calabria, Italy

=== Births ===
- Machine Gun Kelly, Prohibition era gangster
- James Belcastro, Chicago Outfit enforcer
- Frank Cucchiara (Frank Russo) "Frank Caruso"; "Frank the Spoon", Patriarca crime family member, gambling racketeer and drug trafficker
- Stephen Franse, NYPD police informant
- Edward Vogel, "Dutch"; "Five-by-Five", Chicago mobster associated with the Chicago Outfit involved in illegal gambling and slot machine industry in Cook County, Illinois

== 1896 ==
=== Events ===
- Jack Zelig joins Crazy Butch's juvenile street gang as a pickpocket.
- Frank Costello immigrates to the United States with his family to New York from Calabria, Italy.
- March 17 - Black gambler John "Mushmouth" Johnson is shot inside his own saloon by a patron who lost heavily at craps. Although critically wounded, Johnson will survive.

=== Births ===
- Louis Capone, Murder, Inc. hitman
- Sylvestro Carolla, New Orleans Mafia leader
- Samuel Stein, Moe Dalitz associate

== 1897 ==
=== Events ===
- January 23 – Sum Yop Tong leader Fung Jing Toy, known as "Little Pete", is killed by Le-Lum Jung and Chew Tin Gop in San Francisco, California.

=== Births ===
- Jack Diamond "Legs", New York Prohibition gangster
- John Lazia, Kansas City gang leader and enforcer for political boss Tom Pendergast
- Paul Ricca (Paolo deLucia) "The Waiter", Chicago Outfit leader
- Joseph Zerilli, Detroit crime family leader and former Eastside Gang and Pascuzzi Combine member
- February 6 – Louis Buchalter "Lepke", National Crime Syndicate member
- February 20 – Nick Licata, Boss of the Los Angeles crime family
- April 7 – Walter Winchell, New York organized crime journalist
- October 2 – Joseph Profaci "Olive Oil King", Profaci crime family founder and Cosa Nostra leader
- November 24, Charles "Lucky" Luciano (Salvatore Lucania), National Crime Syndicate founder and New York Mafia Don
- November 27 – Vito Genovese, Genovese crime family founder and Cosa Nostra leader.

=== Deaths ===
- January 23 – Little Pete (Fung Jing Toy), Sum Yop Tong leader

== 1898 ==
=== Births ===
- Vincent Drucci (Victor D'Ambrosio), Chicago North Side Gang
- Roger Touhy, Chicago Prohibition gangster
- Hymie Weiss (Earl Wajciechowsky), Chicago North Side Gang leader

=== Deaths ===
- Jefferson R. "Soapy" Smith, con artist and gangster in the Western United States

== 1899 ==
=== Events ===
- A gang war breaks out between the Hip Sing and On Leong Tongs over illegal gambling in New York's Chinatown.
- New York Black Hand leader Giuseppe Morello is arrested for counterfeiting and sentenced to three years. Released in 1902, Morello establishes a system where counterfeit $5 US dollar bills would be printed in Sicily and smuggled into the United States.
- Ignazio Lupo, known as "Lupo the Wolf", arrives in New York.
- Charles Umbriaco arrives in New York later joining the Black Hand under Giuseppe Morello and Ignazio Lupo.

=== Births ===
- Samson Melvin "Samoots", Chicago leader of Unione Siciliana
- Louis Amberg, New York (Brooklyn) gangster
- Anthony Carfano "Little Augie Pisano", Florida gambling racketeer
- Joseph J. DiCarlo "Jerry the Wolf"; "Joe the Gyp", Stefano Magaddino gunman and Miami gambling racketeer
- Murray Humphreys, Chicago Outfit member
- Vincent John Rao (Frank Arra; Nunzio), Lucchese crime family consiglieri and associate of Willie Moretti
- Jacob Shapiro, "Gurrah" Labor union racketeer
- Abner Zwillman, "Longie" New Jersey Prohibition gangster
- January 17 – Al Capone "Scarface", Chicago Mafia leader
- December 1 – Gaetano Lucchese, Lucchese crime family founder
- December 24 – Moe Dalitz [Morris Barney Dalitz], Cleveland mobster and Las Vegas casino owner
