= Luis Enrique Barragán Chávez =

- Photo of Barragán Chávez from his wanted poster
- Born: 10 November 1986; Jilotlán de los Dolores, Mexico
- Died: 31 August 2026 (aged 39); Tocumbo, Mexico
- Cause of death: Gunshot wounds
- Other name: El R-5, El Güicho
- Organization: Cárteles Unidos

Luis Enrique Barragán Chávez (10 November 1986 – 31 August 2026) was a Mexican drug trafficker and leader of the Los Reyes Cartel, a local cartel founded in the municipality of the same name. The cartel is part of the Cárteles Unidos, a coalition of cartels from Michoacán that was formed in response to the advance of Los Zetas into their territory, and later the Jalisco New Generation Cartel.

He was considered the organization's leader following the capture of Alfonso Fernández Magallón on 1 August 2026, until his death during an operation by the Mexican Army on 31 August 2026.

== Career ==
=== Appearance in narco-banners (2017) ===
The first public mention of Barragán Chávez dates to 2017, when two bodies were abandoned in public in Apatzingán, accompanied by a narcomanta (narco-banner) hung by alleged members of La Nueva Familia Michoacana. The narcomanta accused him and Alfonso Fernández Magallón of being "traitors".

=== Regional leadership (2021) ===
Barragán Chávez was reportedly responsible for the cartel's regional command in Los Reyes de Salgado by at least 2021. According to the United States Department of Justice, he formed his own armed wing within the group known as "Fuerzas Especiales Wicho" or "Los R-5", referring to his two nicknames.

In 2021, he was designated by the Jalisco New Generation Cartel as one of its priority targets in the state. Consequently, he was ambushed by CJNG members on 14 June of the same year during a meeting, triggering a confrontation in which nine gunmen were killed, although he managed to escape.

=== Leadership of the Los Reyes Cartel (2026) ===
On 1 August 2026, Alfonso Fernández Magallón, then-leader of the Los Reyes Cartel, was captured in Los Reyes de Salgado. A series of road blockades, vehicle burnings, and clashes with state and federal authorities then occurred at several locations across the state. Following this incident, Barragán Chávez assumed leadership of the cartel, and held it until his death just thirty days later.

The Department of Justice had previously described Chávez as Fernández Magallón's second-in-command.

=== Death ===
Luis Enrique Barragán Chávez was killed during an operation by Mexican security forces on the early morning of 31 August 2026. The operation involved an aircraft that was fired upon by cartel members. His bodyguard was killed in the operation as well.

== US investigation ==
The federal government of the United States began an investigation into Barragán Chávez in Rockwood, Tennessee, in December 2019, after authorities conducted a search of a house used as a methamphetamine storage facility and seized phones that had been in contact with Cárteles Unidos in Michoacán.

On 14 August 2025, the Department of Justice announced charges against five leaders of Cárteles Unidos, including Barragán. He was charged with drug trafficking and illegal possession of firearms. If convicted, the five defendants would have faced a maximum sentence of life imprisonment, but Barragán died as a fugitive and was never tried in the United States.

== Sanctions and reward ==
On 14 August 2025, the United States Department of State designated the Cárteles Unidos as a "foreign terrorist organization", while the United States Department of the Treasury described him as a regional leader of the cartel involved in avocado extortion. The Office of Foreign Assets Control sanctioned Barragán Chávez for links to terrorism, drug trafficking, and extortion.

That same day, the United States government announced a $3 million reward for information leading to the capture and conviction of Barragán Chávez, but the reward became void following his death.

== See also ==
- List of Mexican drug cartel figures
- Mexican drug war
