= Jitender Mann Gogi =

Indian gangster (1983–2021)

- Born: 2 August 1983
- Died: 24 September 2021 (aged 38); Rohini, Delhi, India
- Cause of death: Gunshot wounds
- Criminal charges: Murder, attempted murder, extortion, dacoity, robbery

Jitender Mann "Gogi" (2 August 1983 – 24 September 2021) was an Indian gangster operating in National Capital Region, India. He was a resident of Alipur village, Delhi and is infamous for Burari Shootout and the murder of haryanvi singer Harshita Dhaiya. He was killed inside a court in Rohini, Delhi, on 24 September 2021 by a rival gang.

== Biography ==
=== Life and career ===
Jitender Mann Gogi was a student at Swami Shraddhanand College when his gang was involved in a gang war related to the 2010 Delhi University student elections. By April 2020, when Gogi was captured by Delhi Police, he had 19 cases against his name including murder, attempted murder, extortion, dacoity, and robberies. He is believed to have murdered the Haryanvi singer Harshita Dahiya as a part of an arrangement with her brother-in-law. Earlier, he is believed to have killed a Devender alias Pradhan, an associate of his long time rival Sunil Tajpuria alias Tillu, in Alipur. Gogi and his associates killed an MCD school teacher, Deepak, outside Swaroop Nagar school. In 2018, he killed Ravi Bhardwaj, an associate of Sunil Tajpuria alias Tillu, in Pitampura area of Delhi. He along with his associates also believed to have killed Virender Mann, a BSP leader in October 2019 in Narela, Delhi. In the past, he had managed to escape from police custody three times with the help of his associates. There was a 700,000 rupee award on his head announced by the Delhi and Haryana governments.

He had expressed concerns that he will be killed in an encounter. A few minutes before his arrest he shared a video stating that "Our names are in the encounter list. Police want to encounter us. We are surrendering; we don’t have any weapons."

=== Capture and killing ===
A close associate of Gogi, Kuldeep Maan alias Fajja, posted a photo of three cups for Starbucks drinks marked "Rohit, Gogi and Fajjie" The police were able to trace the photo to a Starbucks outlet in Gurgaon. Police located them in a flat at Mapsko Casabella, Sector 82, and arrested them.

Even when in jail he continued running his extortion racket. He had formed an alliance with a gangster Sandeep alias Kala Jathedi, thought to be in Dubai; Jathedi was arrested on 1 August 2021 with his partner Anuradha Chaudhary alias Revolver Rani at a dhaba on Saharanpur-Yamuna Nagar highway. He attempted to extort bid Rs 5 crore from a Dubai-based businessman.

Fajja escaped from the GTB hospital, and was killed in an encounter on 27 March 2021.

Gogi was being brought into court in Rohini by Delhi Police on 24 September 2021. Two men dressed as lawyers crossed security undetected, and fired upon Gogi, killing him. The perpetrators, identified as Rahul and Jagdeep, said to have been hired by Tillu and his associates, were then shot and killed by Delhi Police. The killing raised serious concerns about the security measures in place in Delhi's courts, with many questioning how the men were able to barge into the court complex carrying weapons.

== See also ==
- 2021 Rohini Court shooting
