= Joseph Iannuzzi =

American mobster and FBI informant (1931–2015)

- Born: Joseph Iannuzzi Jr. June 14, 1931; Port Chester, New York, U.S.
- Died: September 20, 2015 (aged 84); Kerrville, Texas, U.S.
- Other names: "Joe Dogs" "Joe Diner" "Joe Drywall"
- Known for: Undercover informant for "Operation Home Run"
- Notable work: The Mafia Cookbook
- Parent(s): Joseph Iannuzzi Sr. (father); Molly Iannuzzi (mother)
- Allegiance: Gambino crime family
- Military career
- Allegiance: United States
- Branch: United States Army
- Service years: 1948-1951
- Rank: Private
- Battle: Korean War
- Awards: Purple Heart (2)

Joseph Iannuzzi Jr., (1930 or 1931 – September 20, 2015), also known as "Joe Dogs", "Joe Diner" and "Joe Drywall", was a Gambino crime family associate and FBI informant whose cooperation influenced events surrounding the late 1985 assassination of Gambino family boss Paul Castellano and played an indirect, but valuable, role in the 1985 Mafia Commission Trial. Iannuzzi is the author of several books: The Mafia Cookbook, Cooking on the Lam, and his autobiography Joe Dogs: The Life and Crimes of a Mobster. Iannuzzi died September 20, 2015, in Kerrville, Texas, at the Veterans Administrations Medical Center.

== Early years ==
Joseph Iannuzzi Jr. is the son of a prominent Westchester County bookmaker and policy numbers racketeer, Joseph Iannuzzi Sr., and his mother, Molly. Iannuzzi is the first cousin of restaurateur Oswaldo ("Ozzie") Carpanzano who owned "Alfredo's", a fine Italian Restaurant located in Boynton Beach, Florida. At the age of 4 or 5, Iannuzzi would accompany his father on his collection rounds. Joe Jr.'s father had many prominent customers, such as Jack Benny, Eddie Anderson who co-starred on The Jack Benny Show. Joe Jr. met the famous cowboy star Tom Mix and even posed on his horse for a photograph in 1935. Tom Mix would give Joe Jr. a silver dollar on almost every visit. Iannuzzi would also visit the Tonawanda Reservation in Harrison, New York, on a weekly basis. The Native Americans on the reservation would give Joe Jr. Indian Head Pennies.

Iannuzzi's first encounter with the law was at the age of 14. He belonged to a gang called the "Night Raiders". His known cohorts were: Perkie DiLeo, Bob Slater, and George Vigilotti.

In 1945, Iannuzzi's parents divorced, and his mother Molly soon remarried to a man of Irish descent named Edward Muller. Iannuzzi and his stepfather did not get along, so at the age of 14 he hitchhiked his way to Hollywood, California. Although he found employment painting mailboxes, he remained homeless and slept in parked cars or on park benches. Finally, he was found by a police officer and returned to his mother in New York. Iannuzzi stayed home for almost a year then enlisted in the U.S. Army by forging both of his parents' signatures on the U.S. Army application.

== Military career ==
Iannuzzi enlisted in the U.S. Army in September 1948 and later served in the Korean War. During the war, Iannuzzi was wounded twice, and received two Purple Hearts. The Army was tough for him, as he had to learn discipline. Iannuzzi was interested in boxing, and joined the Army boxing team to get out of doing K.P. and other duties. He was an exceptional boxer, and was soon able to attain the rank of Corporal while at Fort Benning, Georgia. This was short-lived, however, as Iannuzzi was reduced in rank to Private because he was caught forging his name on a boxing license in Columbus, Georgia. Iannuzzi was arrested by the Military Police during the second or third round of his third fight. Iannuzzi was Honorably Discharged in October, 1951 after serving over three years. Once discharged, Iannuzzi easily resumed his criminal career.

== Back on the streets ==
Iannuzzi was married three times and is the father of 7 children: Sandra, Sheryl, Debbie, Stephanie, Steve, Joseph and Sonja.

It was during Iannuzzi's third marriage to Giovanna "Bunny" Esposito that his son Joseph Iannuzzi, III was born. Michael "Midge" Belvedere, a Colombo crime family member and successful bookmaker served as his Godfather. Iannuzzi moved from Long Island, New York to Florida in 1967 and found work as a drywall installer. His present employer, who was originally from Harrison, New York, gave Joe Jr. the position of Shop Steward union representative. Iannuzzi's wife Giovanna was happy that he was finally employed legitimately. Unfortunately, his legitimate employment did not last long as Iannuzzi became friends with Nicholas "Jiggs" Forlano, a "retired" Colombo family capo (or "captain").

In 1975, Iannuzzi became a member of Tommy "T.A." Agro's West Palm Beach, Florida crew along with another Gambino associate, Robert "Skinny Bobby" De Simone. Additionally, he became a top enforcer for Gambino family consigliere Joseph N. Gallo. Iannuzzi was soon running operations for the Gambino crime family in South Florida at a high profit running into 8 figures. Iannuzzi was involved in loansharking, rigging horse races, labor racketeering, drug dealing, extortion and robbery.

Iannuzzi suddenly had a heart attack that sent him to the emergency room. During a visit from his wife and daughter, it became apparent that he had gained the attention of the FBI. Iannuzzi left Florida and fled to Chicago to hide from the FBI. When he returned to Florida, Tommy "T.A." Agro was furious with Iannuzzi because he had $22,000.00 of Agro's money when he left Florida.

== Operation Home Run ==
After nearly being beaten to death with a baseball bat and a tire iron by Thomas Agro and two of his crew under orders from Joe N. Gallo, Iannuzzi became an informant for the FBI. The FBI then launched "Operation Home Run" and started a gambling night club in Riviera Beach, Florida. The FBI supplied the money for the gambling club, and FBI agent, Jack Bonino. The Mafia were convinced by Ianuzzi that Bonino, who was known to the Mafia clientele as "John Marino", was a partner of his in the drug trade. The Mafia then welcomed Bonino into their organization, and the FBI was able to gain valuable photographic and video tape evidence against the Mob.

"Operation Home Run" lasted approximately 15 months. The FBI was able to get indictments and convictions against about a dozen club members, including Chief of Police William Boone Darden. Finally, due to an alleged "leak" of information from the investigation, the FBI shut down "Operation Home Run" for the safety of Iannuzzi. The FBI then returned Iannuzzi to New York where he participated in the "Favors" case. Due to Iannuzzi's valuable testimony the government was able to convict six people.

== Cookbook author ==
After Iannuzzi wrote his autobiography he published a cookbook, The Mafia Cookbook. Iannuzzi cooked for Thomas Agro (the same man who beat him) and his men. According to editor Michael Korda, "Joe had honed his skills while cooking for the marshals who guarded him and the FBI agents who came to question him about his former associates." Korda went on to point out the irony "that a mob hanger-on, not even a "made man," better known as a cook than a criminal, had brought low such major organized crime figures as Tony Salerno, Carmine Persico, John Gotti, and Vincent Gigante..." Iannuzzi described his cookbook as the "favorite staples of his former dining companions" and includes recipes for shrimp scampi, veal marsala and steak florentine.
