= Centro Comercial Albán Borja =

Shopping mall in Guayaquil, Ecuador

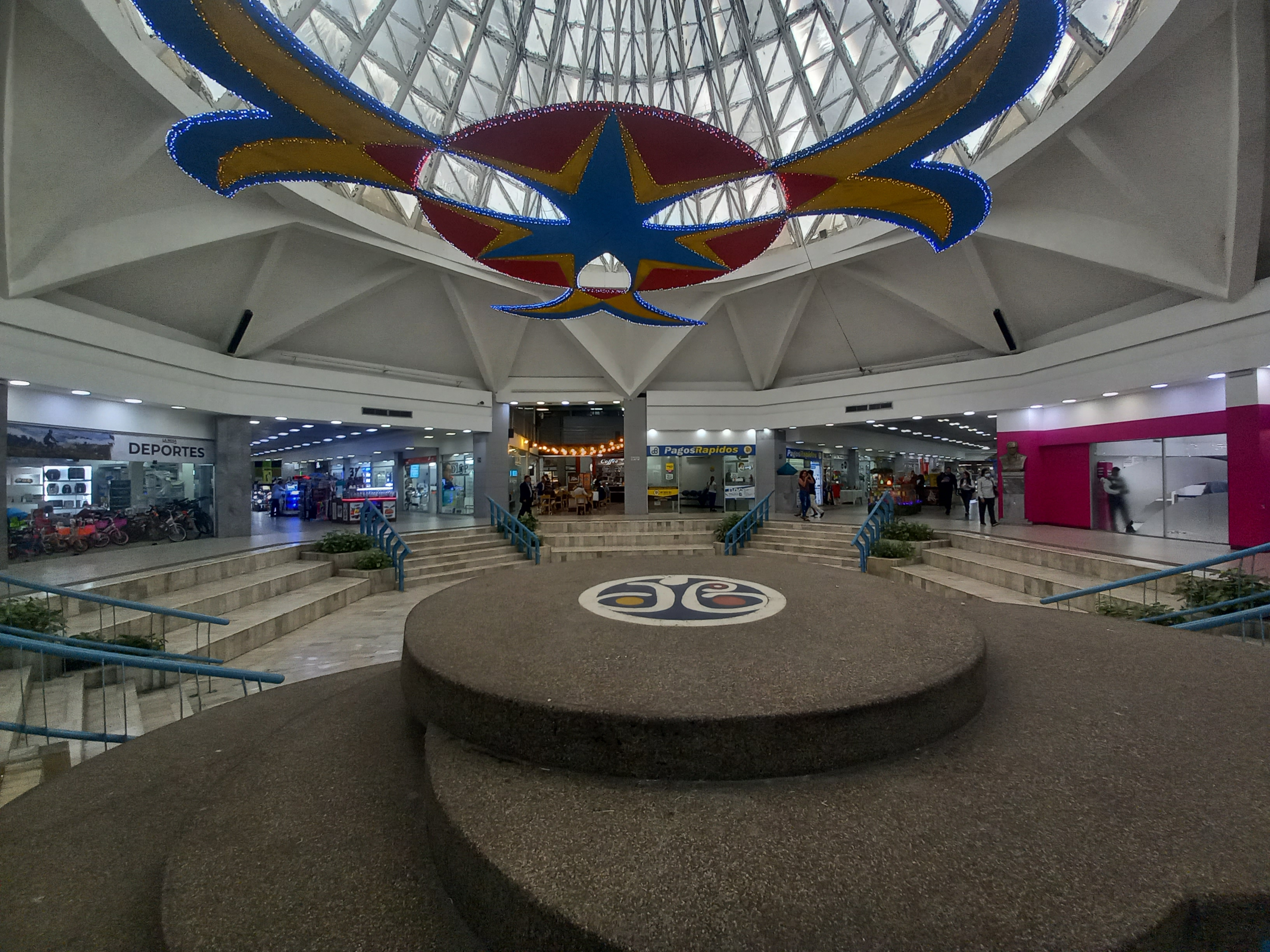
- Location: Guayaquil, Ecuador
- Coordinates: 2.16852186°S 79.91655749°W
- Address: Av. Carlos Julio Arosemena
- Opened: 10 March 1983
- Owner: DK Management Services
- Architect: Comamco y Betonsa
- Num. of stores: 120
- Parking: 800-1400

Centro Comercial Albán Borja is a shopping mall located in Guayaquil, Ecuador. It was inaugurated on 10 March 1983, and its named after Colonel Agustín Albán Borja of the navy; its architecture is based on hexagonal shapes which makes many of the people who visit the shopping center become disoriented, due to the shape of a 8 with seven points makes the food court triangular in shape. With a construction area of 72,000 m^{2}, capacity for 800 vehicles, 130 commercial premises, it is, together with the Policentro, the first two shopping centers in the city of the 80s.

The establishment also functions as an administrative shopping center, with an average of approximately between 15,000 and 20,000 daily visitors for judicial and banking services, business procedures and the purchase of groceries. Its influx increased due to the arrival of the prosecutor's flagrante delicto unit and the office for users of the Municipal Transit Authority (ATM).

In 2017, the shopping center was remodeled for the first time after 34 years of operation, including LED lighting, flooring, and replacement of the wooden deck at a cost of $400,000.
