= Howie Winter =

American mobster (1929–2020)

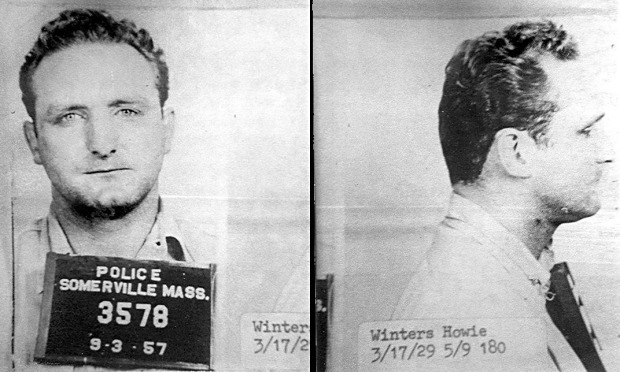
- Winter's September 3, 1956 mugshot
- Born: Howard Thomas Winter; March 17, 1929; Boston, Massachusetts, U.S.
- Died: November 12, 2020 (aged 91); Millbury, Massachusetts, U.S.
- Other name: "Old Man Winter"
- Occupations: Crime boss; trucker
- Years active: 1965–1979
- Predecessor: James McLean
- Successor: Whitey Bulger
- Spouse: Ellen Brogna
- Allegiance: Winter Hill Gang

Howard Thomas Winter (March 17, 1929 – November 12, 2020) was an American mobster who was a boss of the Winter Hill Gang, an Irish mob group in Somerville, Massachusetts, a northwestern suburb of Boston.

== Early life ==
Winter was born in the West Roxbury neighborhood of Boston on March 17, 1929, of German and Irish descent, and raised in the nearby suburb of Somerville. He enlisted in the U.S. Marine Corps in 1943, at the age of 14, and served in World War II.

== Winter Hill Gang ==
Winter was the right-hand man to the originator of the gang, James "Buddy" McLean and took over the rackets, along with Joe McRonald, when McLean was killed during the Irish Mob Wars in 1967. In 1980 Winter, McDonald and other members of the Winter Hill Gang were arrested and indicted on federal "horse race fixing" charges. On August 28, 1979, Winter was sentenced to ten years in prison. James "Whitey" Bulger then replaced Winter as boss of the gang.

Winter was released from prison in 1989 and relocated to St. Louis, where he was in contact with gang associate James "Gentleman Kim" Mulvey, who was a close friend of Raymond L. S. Patriarca. In 1993, he was caught dealing cocaine. When the FBI informed him that Bulger had been an informant all those years and offered Winter a deal if he would inform on Bulger, Winter refused the deal telling the FBI that Mulvey has already informed him of that and he was no "rat", despite facing another decade behind bars, which he would serve, being released from prison in July 2002.

== Later life and death ==
Following his release from prison, Winter worked out of his home in Millbury as a property manager. In 2012, Winter was arrested on charges of extorting money from two people. He pled guilty and was placed on administrative probation.

Winter died in 2020, aged 91
