= National Guard (Mexico) =

Mexican gendarmerie

National Guard Guardia Nacional
- Emblem of the National Guard
- Abbreviation: GN

Agency overview
- Formed: 26 May 2019
- Preceding agency: Federal Police
- Employees: 120,000

Jurisdictional structure
- Operations jurisdiction: Mexico
- Governing body: Secretariat of National Defense
- Constituting instrument: Law of the National Guard (2019)
- General nature: Gendarmerie; Civilian police

Operational structure
- Agency executive: Luis Rodríguez Bucio, Commander

The National Guard (Spanish: Guardia Nacional) is the national gendarmerie of Mexico, created in 2019 by absorbing units and officers from the Federal Police, Military Police, and Naval Police.

In 2022, a reform package approved in the Mexican Congress transferred command of the National Guard to the Secretariat of National Defense.

== History ==
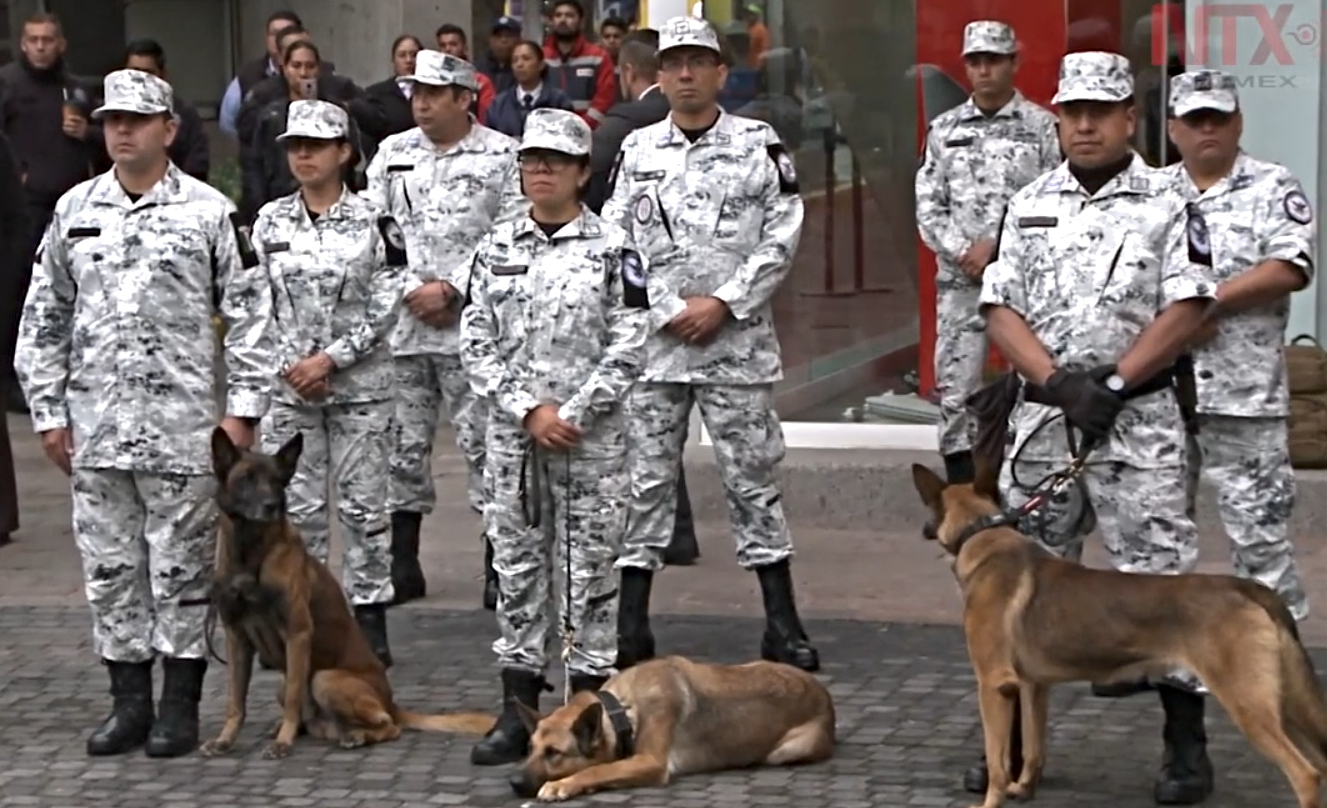
Members of the National Guard

The National Guard was launched by President Andrés Manuel López Obrador in 2019. It has since played a major part in intensifying the enforcement of immigration policy. Before becoming president, López Obrador campaigned on a promise to take the military off the streets. Shortly after assuming office, he released a plan to create the National Guard under control of the Mexican Armed Forces which would be in charge of "preventing and combating crime". López Obrador stated that the new National Guard would be critical to solving Mexico's ongoing security crisis.

On 28 February, Congress voted to approve a 60,000-member national guard. On 27 May 2019, the law regulating the National Guard entered into force. On 30 June 2019, the National Guard was officially established.

In June 2019, as part of a deal with the United States, Mexico agreed to deploy the newly formed National Guard to its border with Guatemala. The guard was not enforcing immigration policy, but after a certain period of time they started to enforce immigration policy.

A 2019 survey sponsored by The Washington Post and Mexican newspaper Reforma gathered information on public opinion regarding both illegal immigration to Mexico and the National Guard. The survey was conducted from 9 July to 14 July 2019, among 1,200 adults across the country in 100 election districts by way of face-to-face interviews. A 53% majority voiced their trust in the National Guard, with two-thirds saying that they would like the National Guard to be in their city, whereas 45% report that they feel more safe with the domestic force. Furthermore, the survey said 51% of Mexicans support utilizing the country's recently formed National Guard to repel migration by illegal immigrants.

In August 2022, the National Guard formed a new tactical unit called Fuerza Especial de Reacción e Intervención (FERI).

== Command structure ==
Legislative acts of Congress assign full control of the National Guard to the Secretary of Security and Civilian Protection, who is in charge of all matters related to the National Guard in law enforcement and public security and the Secretariat of National Defense related to its military work as auxiliary to the Mexican Armed Forces, its education and training, and wartime duties.

According to Article 12 of the Law of the National Guard, it is organized on five command levels:

- Secretary of Security and Civilian Protection/Secretary of National Defense
- Operational Commander
- Territorial Coordinator
- State Coordinator
- Unit Coordinator

== Ranks ==
According to articles 29 and 30 of the Law of the National Guard, the ranks are:

=== Commissioned officers ===
Rank group	General / flag officers			Senior officers			Junior officers
	Commissioners General			Inspectors			Officers
Mexican National Guard
Mexican National Guard	Comisario General	Comisario Jefe	Comisario	Inspector General	Inspector Jefe	Inspector	Subinspector Primero	Subinspector Segundo	Oficial	Suboficial

=== Basic scale ladder ===
Rank group	Senior NCOs		Junior NCOs	Enlisted
Mexican National Guard
Mexican National Guard	Agente Mayor	Agente	Subagente	Guardia Nacional

== Equipment ==
Mexican national guard vehicles
Vehicle	Type	Origin
Vehículo Táctico Huracán	(MRAP)	Mexico
Alacrán APC	(APC)	Mexico
TPS APC 4×4 LAV	(APC)	Mexico
Tiger Mk-II	(APC)	United States
BATT AP	(APC)	United States
Pit Bull VX	(APC)	United States
Panhard VBL ULTRAV M-11	(RV)	France

Aircraft
Aircraft	Type	Origin
Boeing 727	Transport	United States
CASA/IPTN CN-235	Transport	Spain
Hydra Guerrero G1	UAV	Mexico

== See also ==
- Fourth Transformation
- Federal Police (Mexico)
- Illegal immigration to Mexico
