= Federal Police (Mexico) =

Former Mexican federal police

Federal Police Policía Federal 1999–2019
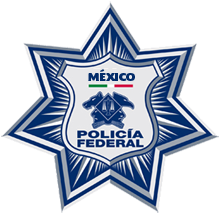
- Abbreviation: PF

Agency overview
- Formed: May 30, 2009 (Federal Preventive Police)
- Preceding agencies: 3rd Military Police Brigade, Mexican Army; Mexican Federal Highway Patrol; Mexican Federal Attorney Police; CISEN Counter-Intelligence Unit
- Dissolved: October 1, 2019
- Superseding agency: National Guard
- Employees: + 40,000 (at disbandment)
- Annual budget: US$34.6 billion (2010)

Jurisdictional structure
- Federal agency: Mexico
- Operations jurisdiction: Mexico
- Governing body: Secretariat of Security and Citizen Protection
- General nature: Federal law enforcement; Civilian police

Notables
- Anniversary: Federal Police Day, June 2

The Federal Police (Spanish: Policía Federal, PF), formerly known as Federal Preventive Police (Spanish: Policía Federal Preventiva) and sometimes referred to as Federales in the United States, was a Mexican national police force formed in 1999. It operated under the authority of Secretariat of Security and Citizen Protection. In 2019, it was incorporated into the National Guard.

The Federal Police was formed through the merger of four previously independent federal police agencies — the Federal Highway Police, the Fiscal Police, the Investigation and National Security Center, and the Mexican Army's 3rd Military Police Brigade — and was initially referred to as the Federal Preventive Police. Throughout its 20-year existence, the Federal Police was dogged by allegations of widespread corruption and abuse allegations which President Andrés Manuel López Obrador said influenced his administration's decision to disband the force. Since its disbandment, two high-ranking commanders have been arrested for offences they committed while leading the Federal Police. The police force was 1,870,406,000 pesos in debt to creditors, members of the public, and former employees when it was disbanded.

== History ==
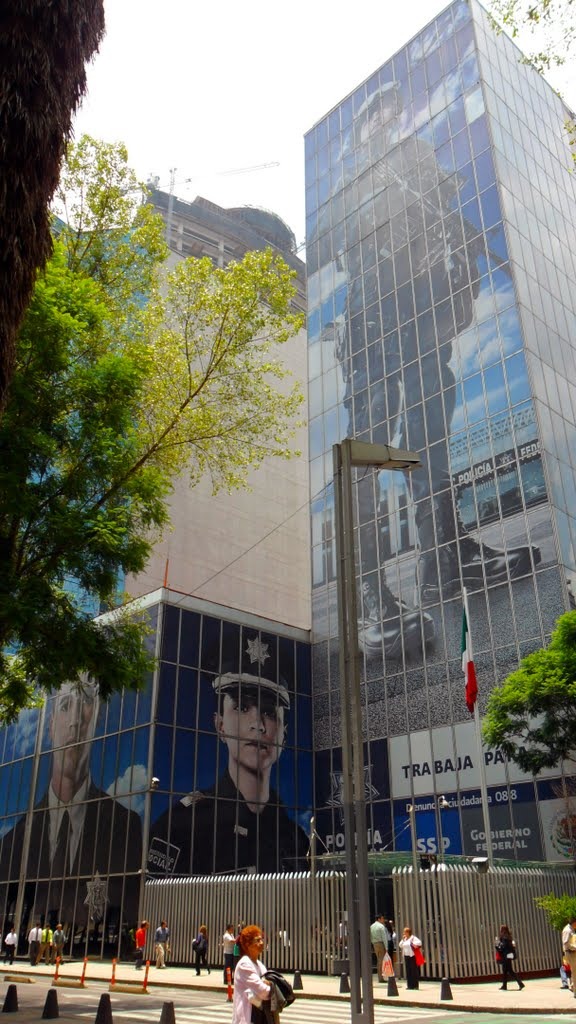
Mexico City Federal Police Building.

On May 29, 2009, the Federal Preventive Police name was changed to Federal Police, and some duties were added to it. The Federal Police was created as the main Federal Preventive Police in 1999 by the initiative of President Ernesto Zedillo (1994–2000) to prevent, combat, and enforce the law that drugs should not circulate on Mexico's streets. The PF has been assuming its authority in stages over time, as its budget has grown and it has combined and reorganized police departments from major agencies such as those for migration, treasury, and highways. Many large bus stations and airports in Mexico are assigned a PF detachment.

Public Safety Secretary Genaro García Luna hoped to reform the nation's long-troubled police. Among other steps, he consolidated several agencies into a Federal Police force of nearly 25,000. The Federal Police celebrates its anniversary on July 13 every year (Federal Police Day), with its history dating to 1928 as the successor of the agencies mentioned above.

=== Mexican Federal Preventive Police ===
Mexican Federal Preventive Police Policía Federal Preventiva de Mexico
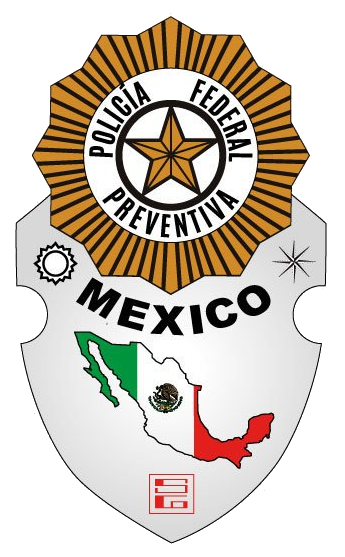
- Abbreviation: PFP

Agency overview
- Formed: January 1, 1999
- Preceding agency: Mexican Federal Highway Patrol
- Dissolved: May 30, 2009
- Superseding agency: Mexico Federal Police
- Employees: 50,000-100,000

Jurisdictional structure
- Federal agency: Mexico
- Operations jurisdiction: Mexico
- General nature: Federal law enforcement

Operational structure
- Headquarters: CDMX, Mexico

The Mexican Federal Preventive Police was an agency created by the Mexican Highway Patrol in 1999. It was replaced by the Mexican Federal Police due to corruption problems and bribing issues. On May 30, 2009, the Mexican Federal Police took over the PFP's duties as the Federal Ministerial Police, which also took over the Mexican Federal Investigative Agency's duties.

=== Calderón's administration ===
When Felipe Calderón took office as president in 2006, there were roughly half a dozen drug cartels in Mexico. Each of the organizations was large and dominated huge parts of Mexico's territorial landscape, and operated internationally and overseas as well. When Calderón assumed the presidency, he realized that he could not rely on the federal police nor the intelligence agencies to restore order and crack down the logistics of the mafias. Over several decades, the cartels had bribed police commanders and top politicians, and often riddled with corruption, state authorities would not only fail to cooperate with other authorities at distinct federal levels, but would actively protect the cartels and their leaders. With limited options available, Calderón turned to the Mexican Armed Forces, which, because of its limited involvement in acting against the cartels, remained relatively immune to corruption and organized crime infiltration. He then moved the military to parts of Mexico most plagued by drug violence to target, capture, and – if necessary – kill the leaders of the drug trafficking organizations. Yet, the president understood that the military could not fight the cartels alone and needed cops to rely on for patrolling, collecting intelligence information, and gathering evidence necessary to prosecute drug traffickers.

With the argument that he was tired of the corruption, Calderón abolished the AFI agency created in May 2009 and created an entirely new police force. The new force has formed part of Mexico's first national crime information system, which stores the fingerprints of everyone arrested in the country. They also have assumed the role of the Army in several parts of the country. According to The New York Times, the federal police have avoided "any serious incidents of corruption."

On October 21, 2008, President Felipe Calderón proposed to break up the former Federal Preventive Police to replace it with a different organization, because "the PFP has not yielded the expected results and has not been a strong institution capable of serving as a model for all police services in the country." The new corporation became the Federal Police. It provides support to the police in the Federal District, states, and municipalities. This decision was said to be not entirely unexpected, given the insufficient number of convictions, the alarming increase in violence, abductions, and cases of corruption and complicity with organized crime elements.

=== Peña Nieto's administration ===
In 2012, it was reported that President Enrique Peña Nieto's government had proposed the creation of a new unit to replace all Federal Police duties. The Federal Police would not be disbanded, but they would be assigned to special tasks and missions. Additional information on Mexico's planned gendarmerie was on the website MexiData.info on December 24, 2012.

In 2014, the Federal Police's Gendarmerie Division was created with 5,000 police agents. Its focus is on providing ongoing public security in areas with heavy criminal activities and providing border security. It is also expected to reinforce state, city, and municipal police forces as needed. It is one of the seven constituent divisions of the Federal Police, reporting directly to the Commissioner, and the newest to be incepted. The National Gendarmerie is defined as a military-grade force within the Federal Police.

=== López Obrador's administration ===
Before becoming President of Mexico, Andrés Manuel López Obrador campaigned on a promise to take the military off the streets of Mexico. Shortly after getting into office, Obrador released a plan to create the National Guard under control of the Mexican Armed Forces which would be in charge of "preventing and combating crime". Obrador stated that the new National Guard would be critical to solving Mexico's ongoing security crisis.

On 28 February, Mexico's General Congress voted to approve a 60,000-member national guard. On 30 June 2019, the National Guard was officially established in the Constitution of Mexico. The new National Guard, de facto successor to a similar formation raised in 1821 and abolished in 1935, is composed today of personnel from parts of both the National Gendarmerie and Federal Forces Divisions of the Federal Police.

== Strength ==
In 2000, the PF had 10,878 agents and staff:

- 4,899 from the Mexican army's 3rd Brigade of the Military Police (Tercera brigada de policía militar), included two military police battalions and an Assault Battalion.
- 4,000 from the Federal Highway Police (Policía Federal de Caminos)
- 1,500 from the Fiscal Police (Policía Fiscal Federal)
- 600 from the Interior Ministry's Center of National Security And Investigation (Centro de Investigación y Seguridad Nacional) – Mexican intelligence agency.

== Organization ==
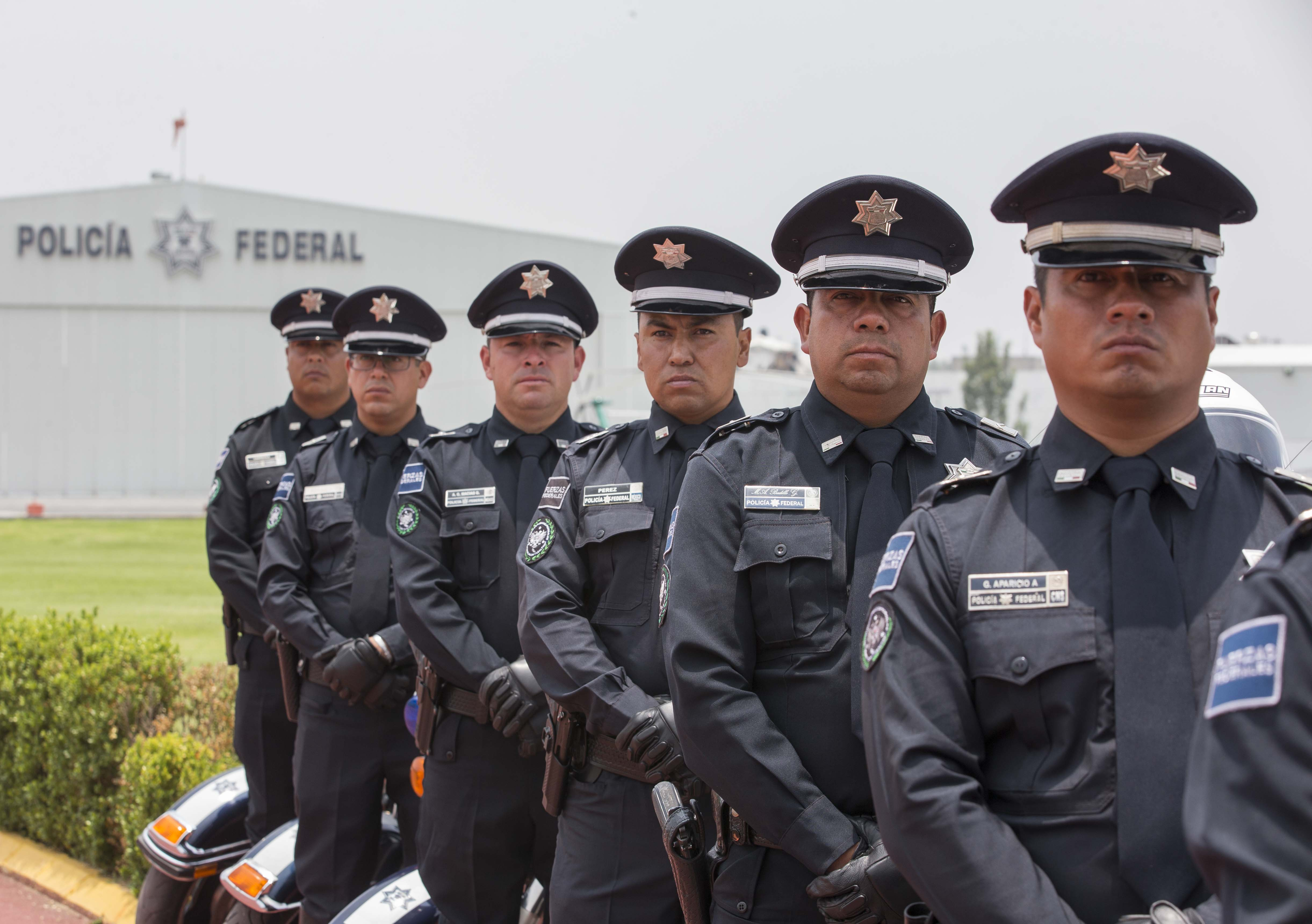
Federal Police Day celebration.

Regulation of the Law of the Federal Police in the Official Gazette of May 17, 2010, to establish the basic organizational structure of this Decentralized Administrative Body, Article 5 of that system, comprising a total of 136 seats of middle and senior management, broken 130 seats, as shown below:

- 1 General Commissioner;
- 7 Divisions: Intelligence Research, Regional Security; Scientific, Drug, Federal and Gendarmerie Forces;
- 1 General Secretariat;
- 1 Internal Affairs;
- 20 Coordination;
- 66 DGs;
- 6 DGs in aid to the Chief of the Division of Regional Security;
- 32 State Coordination at the regional level; and
- 1 Head of Internal Affairs.

=== Commissioner General ===
- Generale Vargas Pitt Azian of Legal Affairs
- Directorate General of Information
- Directorate General of Social Communication
- Directorate General of Planning and Coordination

=== Intelligence Division ===
- Coordination of Technical Services
- General Directorate of Technical Monitoring Center
  - Directorate General of the Center for Risk Alert and Response
  - Directorate General for Development and Operation of Coverage
- Covert Operations Coordination
  - Directorate General Operations and Infiltration
  - Directorate General of Recruitment and Resource Management
  - Directorate General for Supervision and Surveillance
- Coordination Analysis and International Liaison
  - Directorate General of Analysis and Statistics
  - Directorate General for International Police Affairs
  - Indicators DG Information Integration

=== Research Division ===
- Research Coordination Office
  - Directorate General of Tactical Analysis
  - General Directorate of Criminal Records and Records
  - Directorate General for Crisis Management and Negotiation
- Coordination of Field Research
  - DG Research of Crimes against the Security and Integrity of Persons
  - Directorate General for Research of Crimes High Impact
  - DG Research of Federal Crimes
- Technical Research Coordination and Operation
  - Directorate General of Technical Operations
  - Directorate General of Operational Intelligence
  - Directorate General Tactical Support

=== Regional Security Division ===
- DG Personnel
- DG Information
- Directorate General Operations
- Department of Logistics and Training
- Directorate General of Planning and Supervision
- Directorate General of Operational Control
- State Coordinators (32)
- Regional Coordination Zones (5)
  - Central Regional Coordination Zone
  - Northeast Regional Coordination Zone
  - Northwest Regional Coordination Zone
  - West Regional Coordination Zone
  - Southeast Regional Coordination Zone

=== Scientific Division ===
- For the Prevention of Electronic Crimes
  - Department of Cyber Crimes Prevention
  - CERT-MX – Centre of Expertise in Technological Response (Centro Especializado en Respuesta Tecnológica)
  - DG Laboratories in Electronics and Forensic Investigation
- Coordination of Technological Innovation
  - Directorate General for Emerging Information Technologies
  - Department of Infrastructure and Implementation of Technological Processes
  - Directorate General for Innovation and Development
- Coordination of Criminology
  - Directorate General of Criminal Behavior
  - DG Laboratories
  - DG Specialties

=== Drug Division ===
- Drug Research Coordination Office
  - Tactical Analysis Directorate General of Drug
  - Directorate General of Records and Registration of Drug Trafficking and Related Crimes
  - Liaison Department and Institutional Cooperation
  - Field Research Coordination and Technical Drug
  - Directorate General of Technical Operation Drug
  - Directorate General of Drug Intelligence Operations
  - Directorate General Tactical Support against Drug Trafficking and Related Crimes
- Research Coordination Illicit Resources
  - Directorate General of Tactical Analysis of Crimes Financial System
  - Financial Intelligence Directorate for Prevention
  - Prevention Directorate General Operations Illicit Resources

=== Federal Forces Division ===
- Coordination for Law and Order Restoration
  - Directorate General for Force Protection
  - Directorate General for Rescue Operations and Civil Support
  - Directorate General of Prison Transfers and Support
- Coordination of Immediate Quick Reaction Forces
  - Directorate General of Physical Security
  - Directorate General for Quick Action Forces
  - Directorate General of the Canine Units
- Coordination of Special Operations
  - Directorate General of Intervention
  - Directorate General of Explosives
  - Directorate General of Special Equipment

=== National Gendarmerie Division ===
See article: National Gendarmerie (Mexico)

- Coordination Bureau of the National Gendarmerie
  - Directorate General of Planning and Logistics
  - Directorate General of Strategic Operations and Special Units of the Gendarmerie
  - Directorate General of Social Services and Public Affairs

=== General Secretary ===
- Coordination of General Services
  - Directorate General of Human Resources
  - Directorate General of Financial Resources
  - Department of Material Resources
- Air Operations Coordination
  - Directorate General Operations
  - Directorate General Maintenance
  - Directorate General for Aviation and Safety Supervision
- Coordination Technical Support
  - Department of Information
  - Directorate General of Telecommunications
  - Directorate General of Technical Facilities and Maintenance
- Police Coordination System Development
  - Control Directorate General Trust
  - Directorate General of Civil Service System and Disciplinary
  - Directorate-General for Education and Professionalization

=== Internal Affairs ===
- Directorate General for Internal Oversight, Monitoring and
- Directorate General for Internal Investigation
- Directorate General Accountability

=== Superior Academy of Public Security of the Federal Police ===
- Directorate General;
- Directorate-General for Administration;
- Academic Board;
- Preceptory address
- Services Division

=== Divisions ===
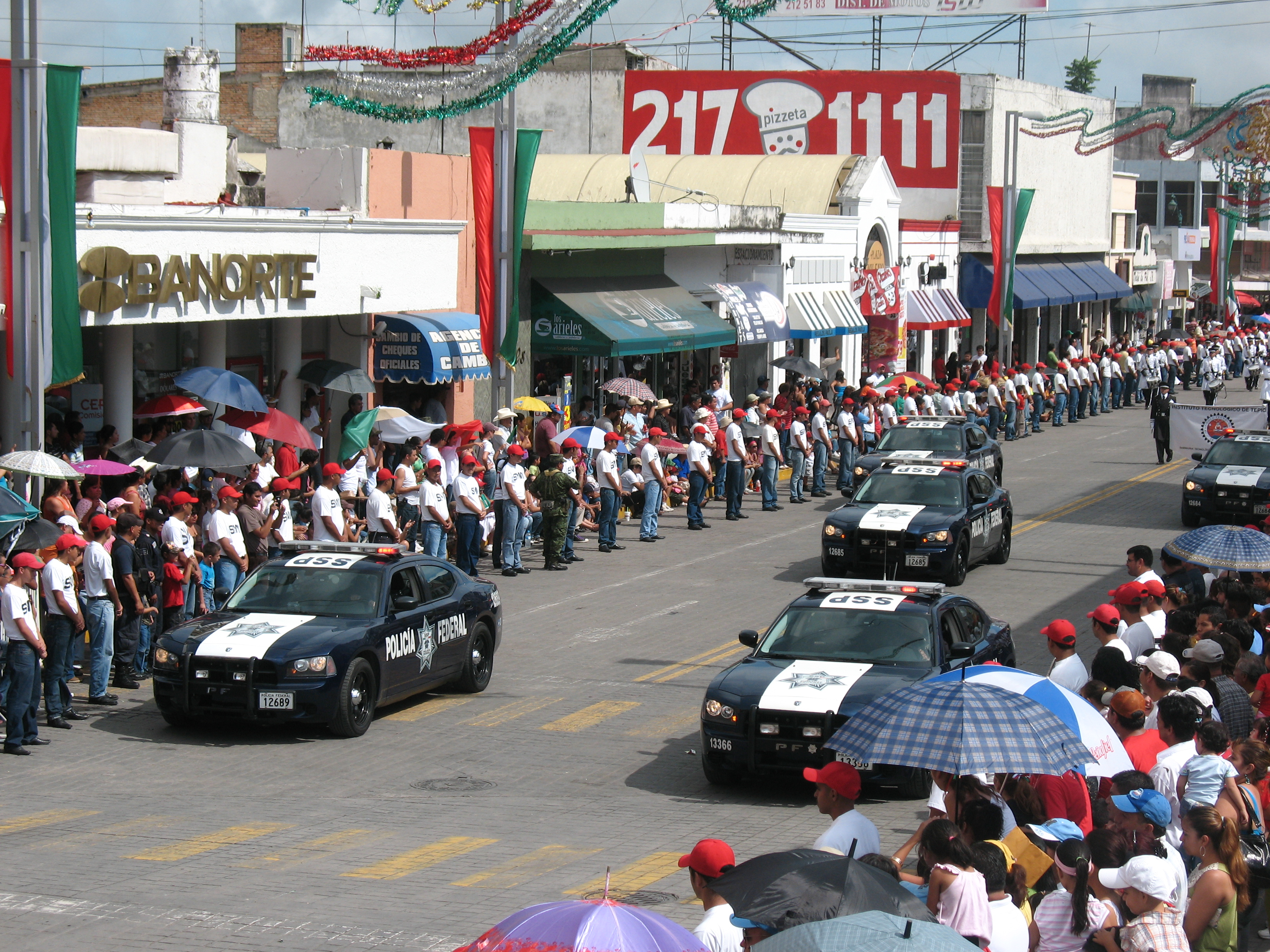
Vehicles of the Policía Federal in a parade in Tepic

The Policía Federal consists of seven branches of service, known as divisions, administered by a central administration called the General Secretariat (Secretaría General)

- Anti-drug Division – División Antidrogas
- Scientific Division – División Científica
- Federal Forces Division – División de Fuerzas Federales
- Intelligence Division – División de Inteligencia
- Investigation Division – División de Investigación
- Regional Security Division – División de Seguridad Regional
- National Gendarmerie Division – División de Gendarmería Nacional

There is also a separate Internal Affairs Unit (Unidad de Asuntos Internos).

2010 included the Policía Federal approx 35,000 civil servants on. A Comisionado General (General Manager), which is used directly by the President of Mexico, heads with wide-ranging powers the institution. Maribel Cervantes Guerrero broke off in February 2012 Facundo Rosas Rosas, who held this office since 2009.

The Special Operations Group (GOPES) is the police elite counter-terror hostage rescue unit.

== Ranks ==
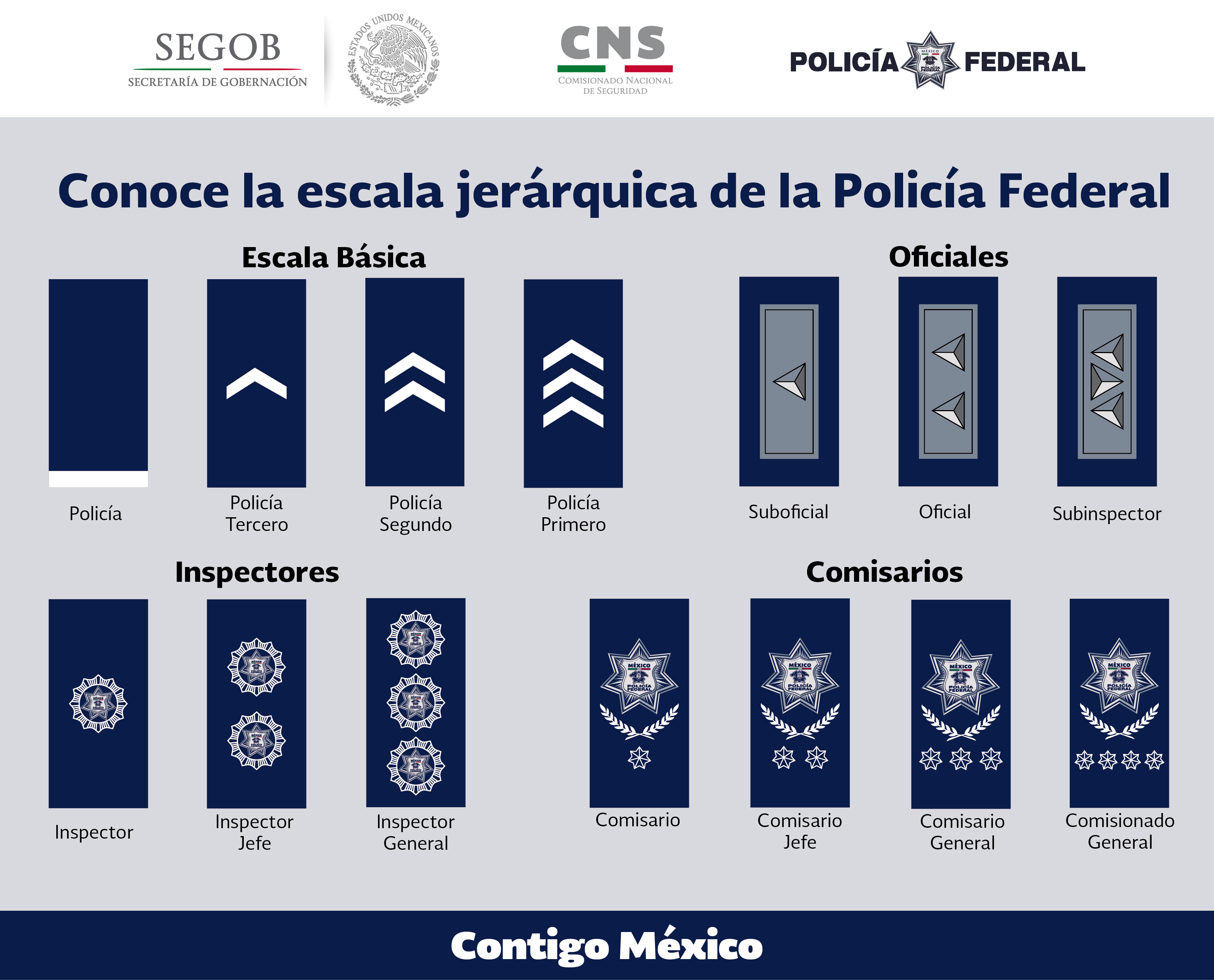
Rank insignia of the Mexican Federal Police.

Commissioned officers

Rank group	General / flag officers					Senior officers			Junior officers
Mexican Federal Police	No equivalent
Mexican Federal Police	No equivalent	Commissioner general Comisionado General	Commissary general Comisario General	Chief commissary Comisario Jefe	Commissary; Comisario	Inspector general Inspector General	Chief inspector Inspector Jefe	Inspector; Inspector	Subinspector; Subinspector	Officer; Oficial	Subofficer; Suboficial

Basic scale ladder

Rank group	Senior NCOs				Junior NCOs		Enlisted
Mexican Federal Police	No equivalent		No equivalent			No equivalent
Mexican Federal Police	No equivalent	Sergeant; Policía Primero	No equivalent	Senior Constable; Policía Segundo	Leading Constable; Policía Tercero	No equivalent	Constable; Policía

The ranks from Commissioner to Commissioner General wear more complex rank insignia involving the seven-pointed star of the Federal Police badge above one to four five-pointed stars placed between two stripes.

== Equipment ==
=== Weapons ===
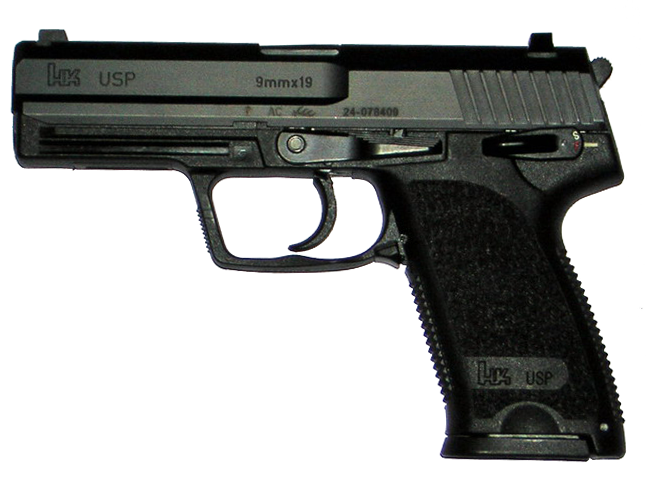
Heckler & Koch USP

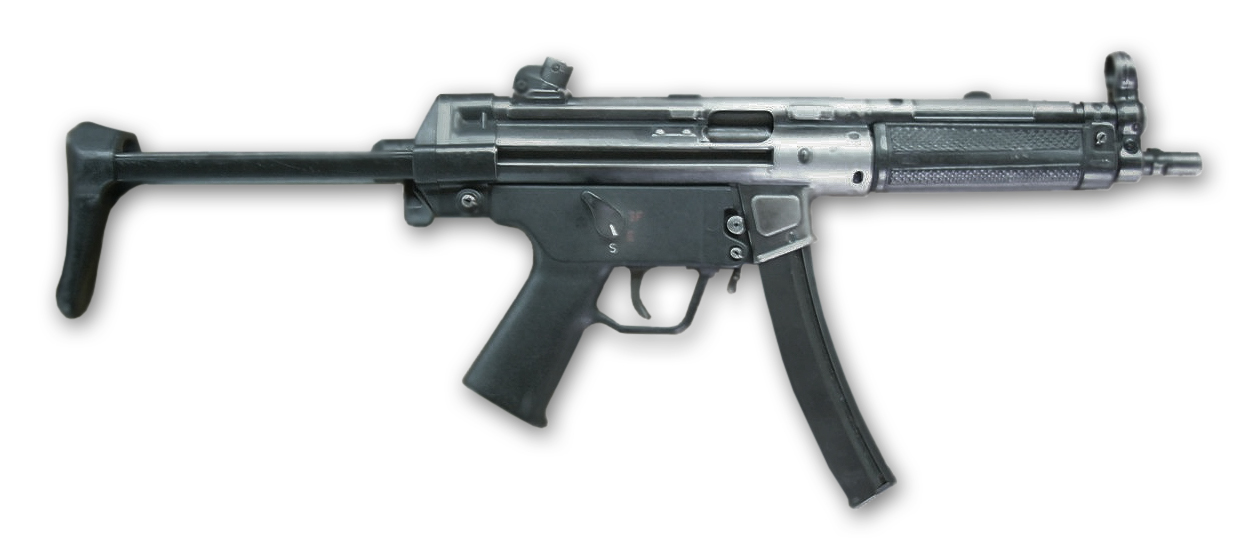
Heckler & Koch MP5

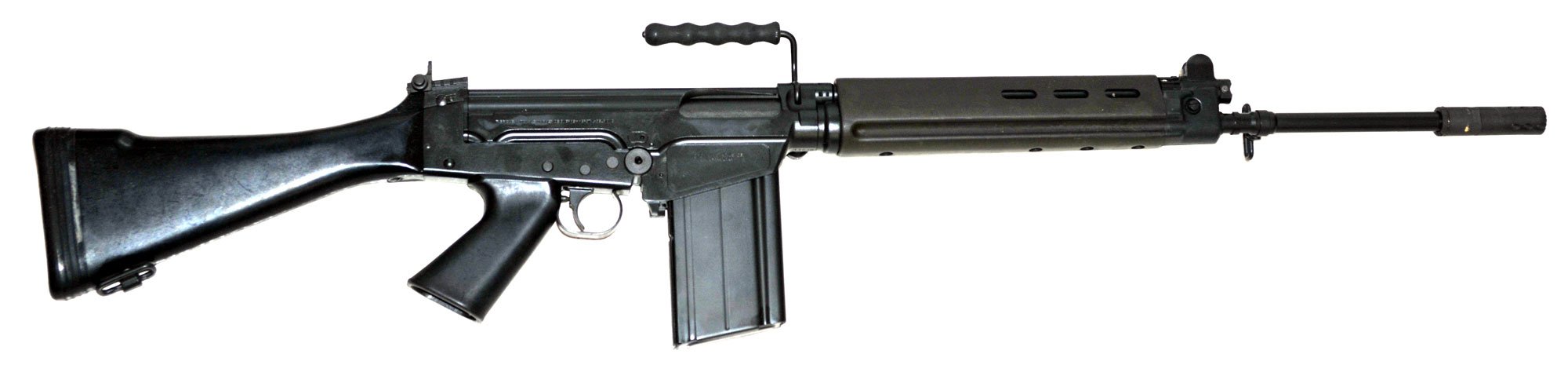
FN FAL

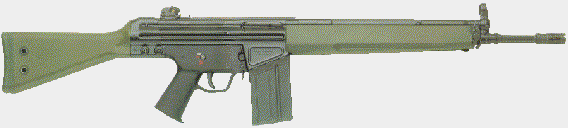
Heckler & Koch G3A3

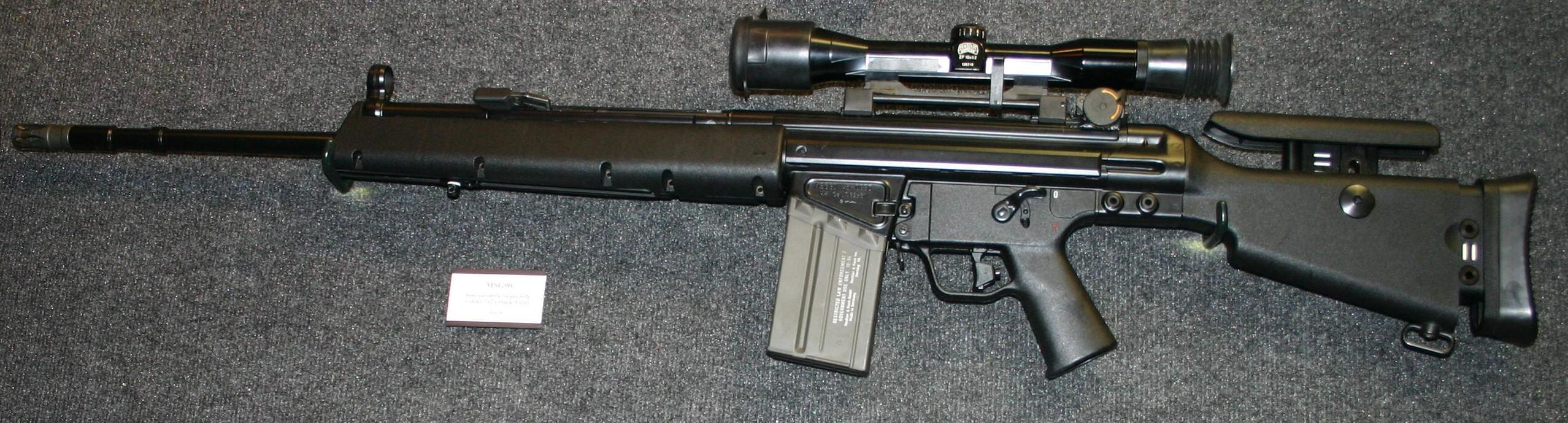
Heckler & Koch MSG90

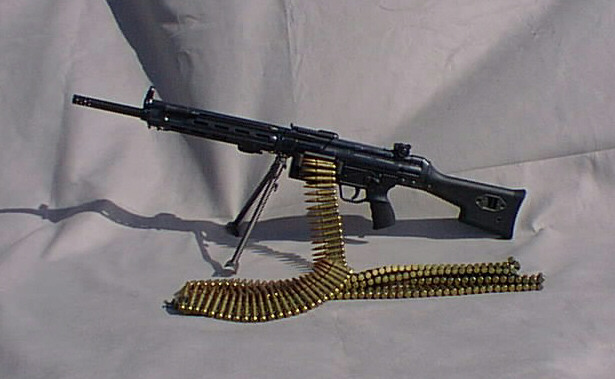
Heckler & Koch HK21

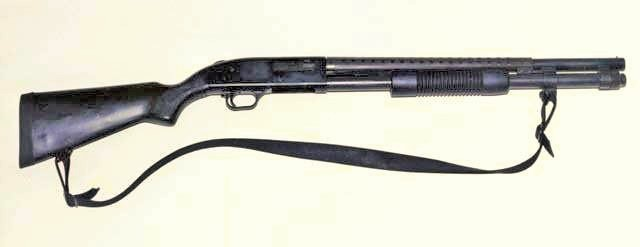
Mossberg 500

==== Pistols ====
- Glock pistol
- Heckler & Koch USP
- Jericho 941
- FNP-9
- CZ P-09

==== Submachine guns ====
- Colt 9 mm SMG
- Heckler & Koch MP5
- Heckler & Koch MP7
- Heckler & Koch UMP
- Uzi

===== Long guns =====
- Beretta AR70/90
- Beretta ARX 160
- CZ-805 BREN
- FN FAL
- Galil ACE
- Heckler & Koch G3

==== Sniper rifles ====
- Barrett M82
- DSR-50
- Heckler & Koch MSG90

==== Machine guns ====
- FN MAG
- FN Minimi
- Heckler & Koch HK21
- IMI Negev
- M2 Browning
- M60E4

==== Shotguns ====
- Mossberg 500

==== Grenade Launchers ====
- Heckler & Koch AG36
- Milkor MGL

=== Transport ===
The Mexican Federal Police has many vehicles: land, sea, and air. It is estimated to own more than 17,000 patrol cars. The exact information regarding transport vehicles and aircraft that comprise the fleet of the Federal Police is classified, to protect the life and efficiency of agents.

Rotary wing and fixed wing pilot training takes place in the school of Naval Aviation located in Las Bajadas, Veracruz.

=== Aircraft ===
Manufacturer	Aircraft	Versions	Type	In Service	Origin	Notes	Image
Fixed-wing aircraft
CASA	CASA CN-235	CN-235-400	Transport	2	Spain	1 on order	
Unmanned aerial vehicles
Hydra Technologies	Hydra Technologies S4 Ehécatl	S4B	Observation & Reconnaissance	12	Mexico	Will be supported by 3 Elbit Hermes 900	
Elbit Systems	Elbit Hermes 450	H-450	Observation & Reconnaissance	4	Israel	10	
Helicopters
Sikorsky	UH-60 Black Hawk	UH-60M/L	Transport & Air Support	13	United States		
Mil	Mil Mi-17	Mi-171-V	Transport & Air Support	3	Russia		
Eurocopter	Eurocopter AS350 Écureuil	AS350L1	Reconnaissance & Air Support	10	European Union	3 more ordered	
Eurocopter	Eurocopter EC120 Colibri	EC120	Transport & Reconnaissance	3	European Union		
Bell Helicopter	Bell 206	B-206L	Transport & Reconnaissance	5	United States	1 loss	
Bell Helicopter	Bell 412	B-412EP	Transport, Air Support & Reconnaissance	3	United States	Recently introduced, accompanied by one B-412 from the FAM	
MD Helicopters	MD 500	MD 530G	Reconnaissance & Air Support	7	United States	Recently introduced, accompanied by one B-412 from the FAM	

== See also ==
- Attorney General of Mexico
- Crime in Mexico
- Grupo de Operaciones Especiales (Mexico)
- Rurales
- Mexican drug war
- United States Marshals Service
