= New Springville Boys =

Italian-American gang

- Founding location: Staten Island, New York
- Years active: 1980s-2000s
- Territory: New Springville, Bulls Head
- Ethnicity: Italian-American
- Membership (est.): Unknown
- Criminal activities: murder, assault, armed robbery, arson, bookmaking, bank robbery, home invasion, racketeering and drug trafficking
- Allies: Bonanno crime family Colombo crime family

The New Springville Boys was an Italian-American recruitment gang or "farm team" for the American Mafia, specifically the Bonanno crime family. The gang frequently operated from the New Springville Mall in Staten Island.

The U.S. Attorney's Office for the Eastern District of New York indicted members of the New Springville Boys which prosecutors alleged was a mob farm team for the Bonanno and Colombo crime families. The crew was charged with burglarizing over 30 night-deposit boxes at banks across the country, netting $240,000, committing push-in robberies, loan sharking and money laundering. They were also charged with hijacking a truckload of marijuana worth over $1 million, and selling drugs in their neighborhood. Members included leader Lee D'Avanzo, Ned Bilali, Robert Catanese, Randy (Randy The Jew) Gordon, Francis Costanzo, William "Big Billy" Fauci, Joseph "Fat Joe" Gambino, and Edward Shamah. The gang members attended Wagner High School or Port Richmond High School. The Staten Island Mall was their main hangout.

Chris Paciello was once a member of The New Springville Boys.

== See also ==
- 10th & Oregon Crew
- East Harlem Purple Gang
- Forty-Two Gang
- South Brooklyn Boys
- Tanglewood Boys

General:

- Crime in New York City
- Italians in New York City
