= Steven Crea =

American mobster

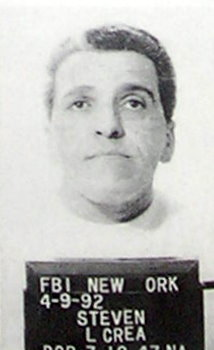
- Crea's April 9, 1992 FBI mugshot
- Born: Steven Lorenzo Crea; July 18, 1947 (age 79); New York City, New York, U.S.
- Other names: "Stevie Wonder"; "Wonder Boy"
- Occupation: Mobster
- Children: Steven D. Crea
- Status: Incarcerated
- Allegiance: Lucchese crime family
- Convictions: Corruption (2004); Murder, racketeering (2019)
- Penalty: 34 months (2004); Life imprisonment (2020)

Details
- Imprisoned at: Federal Medical Center, Butner

Steven Lorenzo "Stevie" Crea (born July 18, 1947) is an American mobster and former underboss of the Lucchese crime family of New York. In August 2020, Crea was sentenced to life imprisonment for murder and racketeering.

== Lucchese crime family ==
=== Rise to power ===
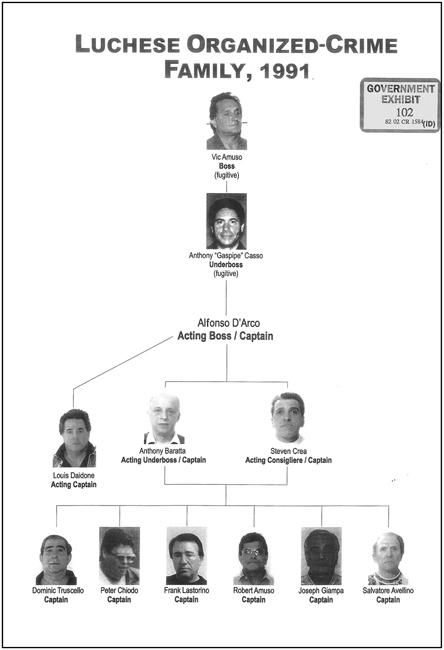
Lucchese crime family - Chart 1991

Steven Crea grew up on Arthur Avenue in Belmont, Bronx, a neighborhood that had a strong Mafia presence. In the late 1970s, Crea worked closely with his mentor and close friend Vincent DiNapoli, a "made" member of the Genovese crime family, who was in the construction "rehab" industry. By 1979, Crea and Vincent DiNapoli began working with SEBCO (South East Bronx Community Organization), an organization created by Catholic priest Louis Gigante, who was the brother of Genovese family boss Vincent Gigante. SEBCO was an organization of low-income housing in the South East Bronx that was funded by the federal Department of Housing and Urban Development. Crea and DiNapoli's drywall companies were able to secure millions of dollars in construction projects award by SEBCO.

Sometime in the early 1980s, Crea was inducted into the Lucchese crime family, under the reign of boss Anthony Corallo.

In 1983, DiNapoli was imprisoned, and Crea took control of the construction business with SEBCO. The Federal Bureau of Investigation (FBI) reported that Crea visited Vincent DiNapoli in prison a number of times. Crea lived in a home just across the street from DiNapoli and he became DiNapoli's daughter godfather, helping her arrange her wedding while DiNapoli was in prison. In 1985, Crea was convicted of conspiracy to plot to murder a Bronx man who Crea believed had assaulted his wife, but in 1987, his conviction was overturned.

In 1990, family boss Victor Amuso promoted Crea to caporegime (captain), taking over Samuel "Sammy Bones" Castaldi's crew in the Bronx. Crea specialized in labor racketeering, and gained control over Carpenter's Local 608, using it to extort New York City contractors. He also held a no-show job at Inner City Drywall, one of the city's largest drywall contractors and was involved with Local 282 of the Cement and Concrete Workers Union.

In 1993, imprisoned family boss Vic Amuso promoted Crea to underboss of the Lucchese family. Crea along with his Bronx allies, shifted the family's power center away from the Brooklyn faction and back to the Bronx and Upper Manhattan crews, which had historically controlled the family for decades. This angered former underboss Anthony Casso and his Brooklyn loyalists George Zappola and Frank "Spaghetti Man" Gioia, Jr. who during the early 1990s, plotted to murder Crea and retake control of the family. The Brooklyn loyalists planned to lure Crea to a sit-down (a mafia meeting) and then murder him. However, the plot fell through after Zappola, Gioia, and the rest of Casso's faction were indicted and imprisoned.

=== Construction boss ===
From 1997 through 1999, Crea served as the head of the "Lucchese Construction Group", which also included Lucchese caporegimes (capos) Dominic Truscello, head of the Prince Street crew, and Joseph Tangorra, head of a Brooklyn crew. The Construction Group brokered the bribes and "mob tax" payments to be received from contractors, and settled disputes over who would dominate a particular construction site. The group also, placed mobsters on company payrolls so they could report legitimate taxable income to the U.S. Internal Revenue Service (IRS). During its existence, the Construction Group controlled over $40 million in construction contracts, increasing overall construction costs by 5%.

In 1998, after acting Lucchese boss Joseph DeFede was indicted on labor racketeering and extortion charges, Crea became the family's new acting boss.

In December 1999, Crea and Joseph Datello talked about bribery and extortion with Sean Richard, the son-in-law of John Riggi, the boss of the DeCavalcante crime family. It was later revealed that Richard was wearing a hidden recording device.

In 1999, it was revealed that Crea had formed an alliance with members of the Gambino crime family in extorting local officials of New York City's carpenters, laborers and bricklayers unions.

=== Guilty plea on corruption charges ===
On September 6, 2000, Crea and other members of the Lucchese Construction Group were indicted in New York on state enterprise corruption, labor racketeering, extortion, and bid-rigging charges. The District Attorney charged that these schemes had systematically siphoned off millions of dollars from both public and private construction projects. Specifically, Crea used mob associates to extort building contractors who wished to receive rights to no-bid jobs or who wanted to reduce the number of union members on their payrolls. Crea's attorney was able to negotiate a favorable plea agreement which called for Crea to plead guilty to enterprise corruption and restraint of trade charges, and in January 2004, he received a 34-month prison sentence. Crea also pleaded guilty to similar federal charges and served both sentences concurrently.

=== Back to power ===
On August 24, 2006, Crea was released from prison with parole restrictions that prohibited him from associating with other mobsters or union officials. On November 17, 2009, Crea's parole restrictions expired. Since his release it was speculated that he would take over the Lucchese crime family when his parole was up. In March 2010, the FBI observed at a Bronx social club Crea meeting with capo John Castellucci.

In July 2014, Jerry Capeci reported that Vic Amuso remains the official boss while Crea serves as acting boss. When the US attorneys office in Manhattan arrested him in 2017, they alleged he was the underboss of the family.

=== Racketeering indictment and life sentence ===
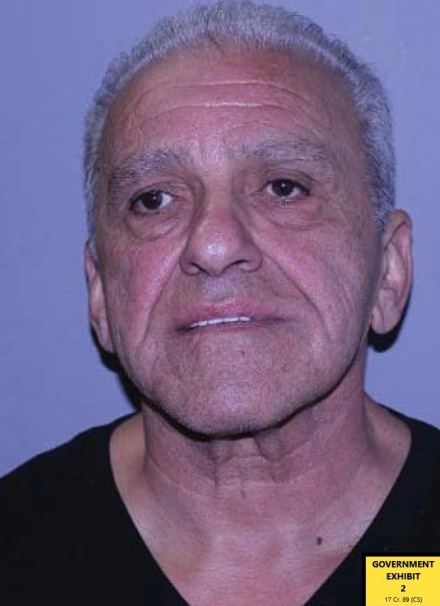
DOJ mugshot of Steven Crea in 2017

On May 31, 2017, Crea was indicted and held without bail for racketeering, fraud and murder conspiracy. The indictment built on charges previously filed against a reputed Lucchese soldier and associate in February 2017 with the murder of Michael Meldish in the Bronx on November 15, 2013; Matthew Madonna, Crea and his son Steven D. Crea, were charged and suspected of serving as co-conspirators in the Meldish gangland execution.

Crea is also accused of ordering the attempted murder of a Bonanno crime family associate. The FBI also accuses Crea of giving his approval for one of his underlings driving to New Hampshire in an attempt to find and murder an informant. Crea was personally charged with mail and wire fraud in connection of his skimming involvement with the construction of a New York City hospital.

On November 15, 2019, Crea, Madonna, Christopher Londonio and Terrence Caldwell were convicted in White Plains federal court of executing the murder of East Harlem Purple Gang leader Michael Meldish.

On August 27, 2020, Crea was sentenced to life in prison, along with a $400,000 fine and the forfeit of $1 million.

After Crea's 2020, imprisonment for the murder of Michael Meldish, he was demoted from his underboss position. Crea was initially incarcerated at the United States Penitentiary, Canaan in Pennsylvania. In April 2024, it was reported by Jerry Capeci that Crea was seeking compassionate release from prison after being diagnosed with stage IV lung cancer. He is undergoing treatment at Federal Medical Center, Butner, North Carolina.

Business positions
Preceded by Anthony "Gaspipe" Casso	Lucchese crime family Underboss; 1993-2020	Patrick "Patty" Dellorusso
