= List of Lucchese crime family mobsters =

== Current members ==
=== Ray Argentina ===
Ray Argentina is a current capo and longtime soldier of the Brooklyn faction. His younger brother Peter Argentina is an associate in the family. In 1992, Argentina along with Louis Daidone, Alan Taglianetti and Robert Molinelli were found guilty in the $1.2 million robbery of an armored truck in Brooklyn in 1988. In 2001, Argentina was indicted along with Louis Gampero and Ken Cardona they were charged with a $3.2 million illegal mortgage fraud activities in Brooklyn, upstate New York and Long Island, and running a cocaine ring in Long Island. On April 5, 2019, Argentina was released from prison. In late 2025, Argentina was promoted to capo of George Zappola's Brooklyn crew, after Zappola was imprisoned.

=== Carmine Avellino ===
Carmine Avellino (born July 15, 1944) is a caporegime operating a crew in Long Island. He is the younger brother to mobster Salvatore Avellino. On April 20, 1983, the FBI recorded a conversation between Carmine and his brother Salvatore Avellino Jr. as they discussed a dispute over a craps game that Carmine had was operating because mobster Aniello Migliore complained to Underboss Salvatore Santoro about Carmine's game it was cutting into Migliore's profits, Salvatore told his brother Carmine, that he should have spoken to his caporegime Joseph Capra before opening the game. In 1984, Avellino and his brother Salvatore had a sitdown with Bonanno crime family members Steven Cannone, Joseph Massino, Salvatore Vitale over King Caterers. It was decided that Avellino would leave King Caterers, a Farmingdale, Long Island company that sold pre-cooked dishes to street vendors alone because the company was protected by the Bonanno family. On January 29, 1988, Carmine Avellino was added to the New Jersey Division of Gaming Enforcement exclusion list. In 1995, Avellino was indicted along with his brother Salvatore Avellino, Anthony Baratta, Frank Federico and Rocco Vitulli for the August 1989, murders of Robert Kubecka and Donald Barstow.

Avellino was released from prison on February 25, 2004. On May 13, 2014, Avellino was charged with sending Lucchese associates and brothers Michael and Daniel Capra, in 2010 to collect a $100,000 loan and assaulting a 70-year-old man. In May 2014, the FBI observed a sit-down on Long Island between Avellino and a member in Avellino's crew Michael DeSantis along with Brooklyn capo John Castellucci and a member of Castellucci's crew John Cerrella over an illegal criminal activity between DeSantis, Cerrella and Castellucci. On August 12, 2016, Avellino pleaded guilty to an extortionate collection of credit conspiracy. On May 23, 2017, Avellino was sentenced to 1 year of house arrest, 5 years' probation and fined $100,000. His attorney stated during the trial that Avellino had suffered 2 heart attacks and is suffering from Parkinson's disease.

=== Anthony Baratta ===
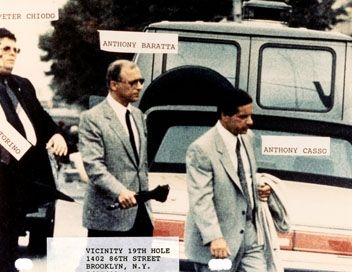
FBI surveillance photograph of Baratta, Casso and Chiodo

Anthony "Bowat" Baratta (born July 3, 1938) is the current consigliere in the family. Baratta was the former capo of the Harlem crew. In 1978, Baratta was made into the family and operated with the Bronx faction. Baratta owned a restaurant in East Harlem and regularly spent time at Rao's on Pleasant Avenue. In the early 1980s, Baratta was promoted to capo of the "Harlem Crew", controlling the Pleasant Avenue narcotics ring in East Harlem and other rackets in the Bronx and Long Island. Baratta placed soldier Joseph Massaro in charge of running his Long Island topless bars operations. In 1980, Baratta and Massaro started a feud with the Bonanno family, when Massaro began taking over the Bonanno's topless bars. FBI agent Joseph D. Pistone, who was working undercover in the Bonanno's as "Donnie Brasco", heard of the two families having a sit-down over Long Island topless bars.

In November 1989, Baratta along with boss Vic Amuso, underboss Anthony Casso, capos Al D'Arco, Sal Avellino, Peter Chiodo, Bobby Amuso and Frank Lastorino inducted Richie Pagliarulo, Mike DeSantis, Frank Federico and two others into the family. In January 1991, boss Vic Amuso and underboss Anthony Casso went into hiding and promoted Al D'Arco to acting boss, Baratta was promoted to acting underboss and Steven Crea to acting consigliere. In 1991, Baratta serving as acting underboss viewed a Genovese family list of proposed new members, he commented to D'Arco, after seeing the name Ralph Desimone "He is a rat.". A sit-down was arranged between the two families. The Genovese family acting boss Liborio Bellomo, acting underboss Michael Generoso and consigliere James Ida attended the meeting to discuss "Ralph Desimone" with Lucchese's acting boss Al D'Arco and Baratta as acting underboss. The Genovese leaders asked Baratta about Desimone he said "Desimone had been a government witness", the Genovese leaders leave saying "will take care of it". On June 13, 1991, Desimone's dead body was found in a trunk of a car at LaGuardia Airport.

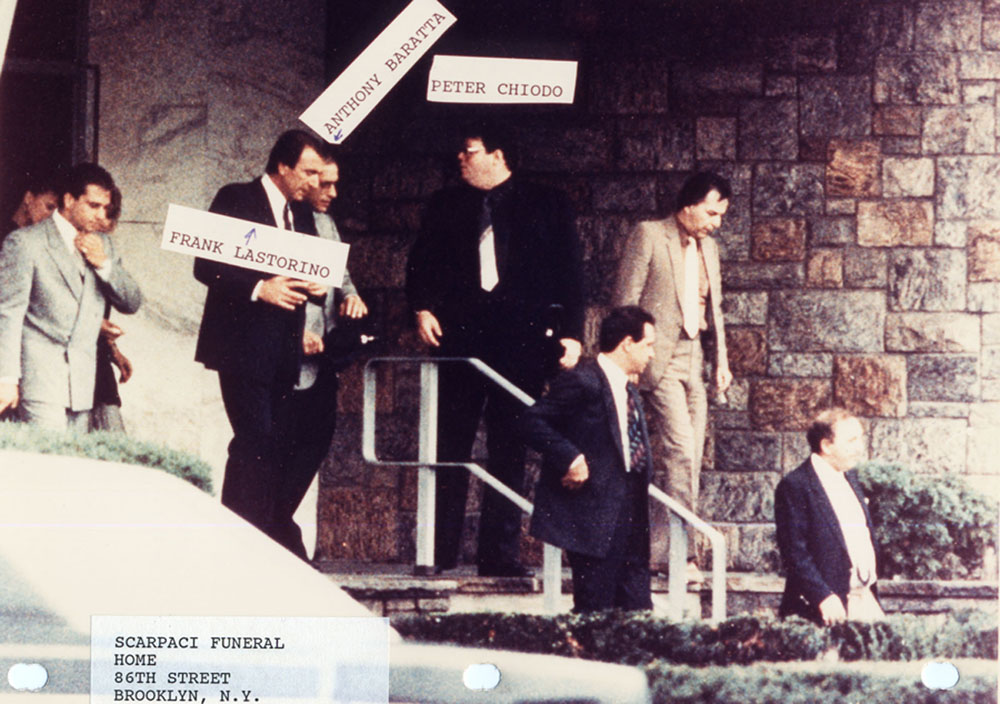
FBI surveillance photograph of Baratta, Lastorino and Chiodo

In early September 1991, Amuso demoted D'Arco and created a "Ruling panel" to run the family, Baratta became a member along with Salvatore Avellino, Frank Lastorino and Alpnonse D'Arco. Baratta was also given control of the Garment center racket with Sidney Liberman. Amuso transferred Patty Dellorusso, a soldier in charge of running the airport rackets from Al D'Arco crew into Baratta's crew. Baratta was in charge of arranging the panel meetings the first was held in East Harlem. On September 18, 1991, Baratta along with capo Frank Lastorino and soldiers Mike DeSantis and Frankie Frederico conspired to kill Alphonse D'Arco in the Kimberly Hotel in Manhattan but failed, D'Arco defected on September 21, 1991, and became a government witness. The ruling panel continued to control the family in October 1991, they inducted (made) Thomas D'Ambrosia, Joseph Tortorello Jr., Frank Gioia Jr., Gregory Cappello and Jody Calabrese into the Lucchese family. In June 1992, Baratta was jailed on murder and racketeering charges.

In November 1993, Baratta took a plea deal and was sentenced to fifteen years in prison. In January 1995, Baratta was indicted along with Carmine Avellino, Frank Federico and Rocco Vitulli on the August 1989, murders of Robert M. Kubecka and Donald Barstow two executives of a Long Island trash-collection company. In September 1996, Baratta was imprisoned in the Otisville Federal Correctional Institution. He began working with DeCavalcante crime family associates in trafficking Asian heroin. On September 23, 1997, Baratta along with Albert Puco and twelve others were arrested and charged with conspiracy to sell narcotics. Baratta was sentenced to eight years in prison. Baratta was released from prison on September 25, 2012. In May 2020, Baratta was identified in an FBI surveillance photo meeting with Lucchese members acting boss Mike DeSantis, consigliere Andrew DeSimone, soldier Anthony Villani, and caporegimes Frank Salerno and George Zappola in Jefferson Park.

=== John Baudanza ===
John Baudanza is a soldier, who operated in his father-in-law Domenico Cutaia's Brooklyn crew. His father Carmine and uncle Joseph are both members of the Colombo family. During the early 1990s, Baudanza worked with his cousin Joseph M. Baudanza running stock fraud crimes for the Colombo family. He married Danielle Cutaia the daughter of Domenico Cutaia a capo in the Lucchese family. In 1995, he was inducted into the Lucchese family.

On March 23, 2006, Baudanza was indicted along with his father Carmine, his uncle Joseph, Colombo family soldier Craig Marino, Colombo family associates Craig Leszczak, Robert Podlog and Arthur Gunning on racketeering charges related to operating a "pump and dump" stock scam. He pleaded guilty on April 17, 2007, to extortion charges. In December 2007, he was sentenced to seven years in prison. In February 2008, Baudanza was indicted along with his father-in-law capo Domenico Cutaia, soldiers Salavatore Cutaia, Michael Corcione, associates Steven Lapella, Victor Sperber, Louis Colello, and John Rodopolous on loansharking, illegal gambling and extortion charges. He was released from prison on July 31, 2015.

=== Dominick Capelli ===
Dominick "Nicky Pepsi" Capelli is a soldier in the Bronx crew of former capo Salvatore DiSimone operating a large illegal gambling operation in Westchester. On October 1, 2009, Capelli was indicted along with acting capo Andrew DiSimone and associates John Alevis, Peter Veltri, Tomislav Dobrilovic, Seth Trustman, Steven Mayer, Clemente Castracucco, Edgar Concepcion, Paul Cuzzo, Ernest Cuzzo, Anthony Cuzzo, Vincent Laface, Thomas Mantey, Paul Aust, Philip Mercurio, Michael Silverman, Anthony Garcia and Osama Ghoubrial on bribery and illegal gambling charges uncovered during the federal investigation dubbed "Operation Open House". On September 30, 2013, Capelli was released from prison. On March 27, 2018, the New York State Attorney Generals Office - Organized Crime Task Force concluded its investigation deemed “Operation The Vig Is Up” and three separate indictments were released the first charged Capelli and his crew based out of New Rochelle with loan sharking and bookmaking activities the second charged Michael Lepore and Vincent Tardibuono with running an online bookmaking operation via website and the finale indictment charged Lucien Cappello with criminal sale of a controlled substance. Capelli was arrested and charged along with his crew of associates Robert Wagner, Frank McKiernan, Anthony Martino, Michael Wagner, Steve Murray, Seth Trustman, Richard Caccavale, Robert Wagner Jr. and Jessica Bismark on loan-sharking operation operating from the Bronx and Westchester County that collected interest payouts exceeding a million dollars just during the approximately one-year investigation.

=== John Capra ===
John "Johnny Hooks" Capra (born April 6, 1940) was a former capo with operations in the Bronx and Westchester. During 1969 to 1973, Capra controlled a heroin distribution network from Pleasant Avenue in East Harlem. In 1973, Capra was indicted along with his associate Steven "Beansie Dellacava on drug trafficking charges related to heroin and cocaine. In February 1995, Capra was indicted along with capo Joseph Giampa, Gennaro "Gerry Giampa" Vittorio, Joseph Gaito, James McManus, Benjamin Segarra and Elliot Porco and charged them with RICO, conspiring to import narcotics, transport stolen vehicles and establishing a gambling operation. The indictment revealed that Capra was made member in the Lucchese family but was a member of a different crew other than the Giampa crew. In the early 2000s, the New Jersey Division of Criminal Justice secretly recorded conversations during one of these conversations Matthew Madonna discussed how they placed John Capra in charge of the New Jersey crew in order to bring back peace between the factions. Capra was later succeeded as capo of the New Jersey crew by Nicodemo S. Scarfo, who was later replaced by Ralph V. Perna. In 2005, Capra was indicted along with Lucchese family associates Al Alvarez and Mark Denuzio, Genovese crime family soldier Pasquale Deluca, Gambino crime family acting boss Arnold Squitieri, acting underboss Anthony Megale, capo Gregory DePalma and others on extortion charges in Westchester and illegal gambling charges in the Bronx. Capra received an eighteen-month sentence and was released from federal prison on September 10, 2008.

=== Michael Capra ===
Michael "Mikey Cap" Capra is a made member in the Bronx faction and a former acting captain. In 1994, Capra along with Genovese capo James Messera, Genovese soldier Ernest Muscarella, Lucchese soldier Peter "Jacko" Vario, Lucchese soldier Michael Labarbara Jr. and others came under a corruption investigation for their involvement during the 1980s of the Mason Tenders District Council of Laborers International Union. In 1995, Capra was identified as an acting capo in the Lucchese family during a trial of capo Joseph Giampa and his crew members.

=== Vincent Casablanca ===
Vincent "Vinny" Casablanca (1967) is a soldier operating from the Bronx. In August 2016, Casablanca was indicted along with 45 other mobsters from the Genovese, Gambino, Lucchese, Bonanno, and Philadelphia crime families; he was charged with conspiracy to extort and contraband cigarettes. On October 30, 2018, he was released from prison.

=== Paul Cassano ===
Paul "Paulie Roast Beef" Cassano (1979) is a soldier in the Bronx faction. On August 4, 2016, Cassano, was indicted along with 45 others on charges of criminal activities throughout the East Coast. On May 31, 2017, Cassano along with Acting Boss Matthew Madonna, Underboss Steven Crea Sr., Consigliere Joseph DiNapoli, Capo Steven Crea Jr., and others were indicted and charged with racketeering, murder, narcotics (cocaine, heroin, marijuana, prescribed medication), and firearms offenses. The indictment charged Cassano and Lucchese soldier Vincent Bruno with the 2012 attempted murder of a Bonanno family associate. In 2012, a group of Bonanno family associates forced their way into a Lucchese family Bronx social club and one of the Bonanno associates offended Underboss Steven L. Crea. After the intrusion Steven Crea ordered his son capo Steven D. Crea Jr. to have the Bonanno associate killed and Crea Jr. passed the order to Cassano and Bruno. The next night Cassano and Bruno went to kill the Bonanno associate in his Bronx residence but they failed. The murder was never carried out and the dispute between both was settled. In 2017, Cassano pled guilty to attempted assault in aid of racketeering and was sentenced to 18 months in prison. Cassano was released from prison on September 20, 2018.

=== Anthony Castelle ===
Anthony "Spanky" Castelle soldier and acting captain for "Joe Cafe" DeSena crew. Castelle is a former NYC sanitation worker. He has two brothers in the Lucchese family, John Castellucci the former capo of the "Brooklyn faction" and Eugene "Boopsie" Castelle, former capo of the Bensonhurst crew. Castelle is the owner of "Coney Island Container" a private carting company that came under investigation for a suspicious fire in 2009.

=== Eugene Castelle ===
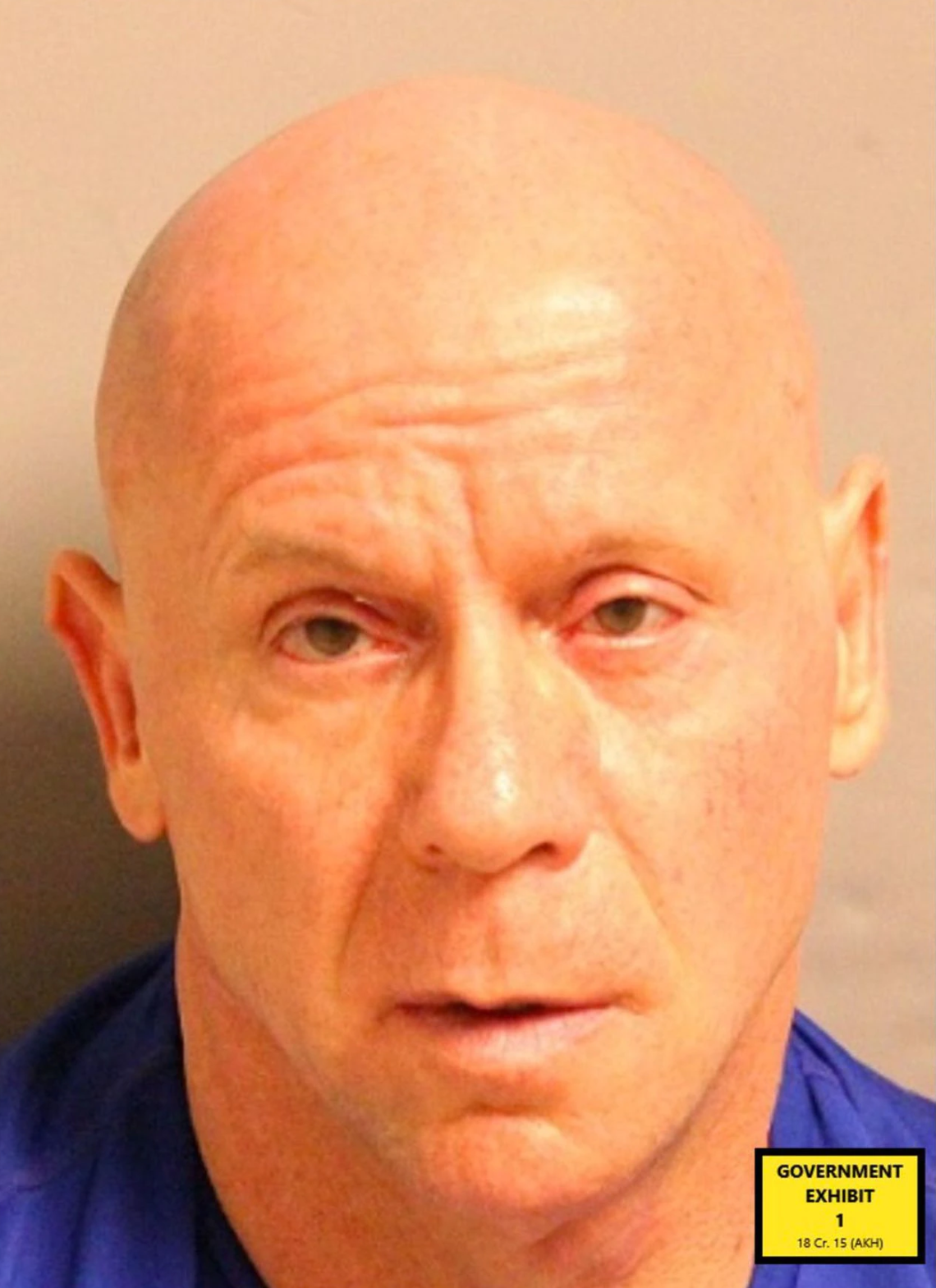
DOJ mugshot of Castelle in 2017

Eugene "Boopsie" Castelle soldier and former captain and a former acting underboss. Castelle has two brothers John Castellucci a member of the "Bensonhurst crew" and Anthony Castelle the owner of "Coney Island Container" a private carting company that came under investigation for a suspicious fire in 2009. In 1997, Castelle was charged with bribing guards to smuggle food and steroids into the Brooklyn Metropolitan Detention Center. From 1998 to 2000, Castelle served as acting underboss, while operating from Bath Ave in Brooklyn. On November 12, 2000, Castelle was indicted along with capo Joseph Tangorra, soldiers Joseph Truncale and Scott Gervasi and associates John Castellucci, Lester Ellis and Robert Greenberg on drug trafficking, extortion and loansharking charges.

On August 28, 2008, Castelle was released from prison. On May 26, 2016, Eugene Castelle along with Anthony Grecco, Gaetano "Tommy" Zuccarello, Vincent Mormile, Theodore Vasilakis and Ioannis "John" Dinos were arrested and charged with running an online gambling operation that made over $13 million. On January 12, 2018, Castelle, along with Bonanno family Acting Boss Joseph Cammarano Jr. and seven other members of the Bonanno family and one member of the Genovese family were arrested and charged with racketeering and loan sharking related offenses. In the indictment Castelle was charged with conspiracy to commit extortion. In May 2019, Castelle's illegal gambling trial began and former Lucchese family soldier turned government witness John Pennisi testified against him. On May 31, 2019, Castelle was found guilty of conspiracy to commit racketeering and of operating an illegal gambling business. He was sentenced to over six years in prison for running an illegal sports betting website. In March 2020, Castelle requested a release from prison due to coronavirus fears. Castelle was released from prison on April 1, 2020. On April 3, 2020, Castelle was released from prison on bail to await his appeal of his 2019 illegal gambling conviction due to health risks of the COVID-19 pandemic. In 2021, Castelle was ordered to surrender and was re-incarcerated and released from prison on October 4, 2024.

=== John Castellucci ===
John "Big John" Castellucci (born June 18, 1959), (surname alternatively spelled Castelucci), he is also known as "John Castelle", is the former capo of the "Brooklyn faction". Castellucci has two brothers, Eugene Castelle, a member of the Bensonhurst crew, and Anthony Castelle, the owner of "Coney Island Container", a private carting company that came under investigation for a suspicious fire in 2009. On November 12, 2000, Castellucci was indicted along with acting underboss Eugene Castelle, capo Joseph Tangorra, soldiers Joseph Truncale and Scott Gervasi and associates Lester Ellis and Robert Greenberg on drug trafficking, extortion and loansharking charges. Castellucci was released from prison on October 20, 2004.

In 2010, Castellucci was under investigation of the Independent Review Board of the International Brotherhood of Teamsters for his connection with the Lucchese family. Castellucci become a Local 282 member in April 2006, which he was permanently barred from holding membership in or any position within the IBT. During the investigation it was reported that Castellucci worked for Andrews Trucking Corporation a company controlled by alleged Gambino family associate Joseph Spinnato. The investigation also reported that Local 295 principal officer Anthony Calagna and Local 295 steward Patrick Dellorusso, were both members of the Lucchese family while Locals 813 and 1034 member Bernard Adelstein, Local 522 member John Ferrara and Local 560 member Onofrio Mezzina were found to be associates of the Lucchese family. Castellucci was observed during the investigation on March 9, 2010, at a social club at 3205 Westchester Avenue in the Bronx for a "walk and talk" with Steven Crea, who the FBI identified as the head of the Lucchese family. In 2013, a secret initiation ceremony for John Pennisi was conducted in a Staten Island home by acting boss Matthew Madonna and Castellucci. In May 2014, the FBI observed a sit-down on Long Island between Castellucci a member of his crew John Cerrella and Long Island capo Carmine Avellino and a member in Avellino's crew soldier Michael DeSantis over an illegal criminal activity between DeSantis, Cerrella and Castellucci.

On May 31, 2017, John Castellucci along with Street Boss Matthew Madonna, Underboss Steven Crea Sr., Consigliere Joseph DiNapoli and other members of the family were indicted and charged with racketeering, murder, narcotics (cocaine, heroin, marijuana, prescribed medication), and firearms offenses. In January 2019, Castellucci and Joseph DiNapoli pleaded guilty and await sentencing. He was sentenced to 37 months in prison and received a $150,000 fine on racketeering conspiracy. In May 2019, government informant John Pennisi testified that Castellucci's-Brooklyn crew (formerly Amuso-Casso's old crew) is now based in Tottenville section of Staten Island. On January 18, 2022, Castellucci was released from prison.

=== John Cerrella ===
John "Johnny Sideburns" Cerrella is a soldier in the Brooklyn faction. Cerrella once served as an acting capo of Domenico Cutaia's crew. Cerrella was raised in Harlem, New York before moving to Florida. During the early 1970s, Cerrella became an associate to Genovese family member Pasquale "Paddy Mac" Macchiarole, whose crew operated in New York and Florida. Cerrella relocated to Broward County, Florida after members of the Macchiarole crew were murdered. While hiding out in South Florida, Cerrella began working with twin brother Carmine and Peter Romano. The Romano brothers eldest brother was Vincent "Big Fish" Romano a soldier in the Genovese family who operated in the Fulton Fish Market. Cerrella along with his friend Thomas "Tommy C" Chiantese became associates to Vincent Romano and the Genovese family in Florida. With the support of the Romano brothers and the Genovese family the team of Cerrella and Chiantese opened Sunshine valet and parking service to extort rival valet businesses in the Fort Lauderdale area. In 1977, Cerrella and Tommy Chiantese were indicted for extorting valet businesses during 1974 and 1975. Cerrella received a 16-year prison sentence and Chiantese received a 13-year prison sentence. On March 22, 1978, NYPD discovered two dead bodies inside the trunks of cars parked 10 block away from each other the first was Pasquale Macchiarole, who was Cerrella's old mentor and the second was Patrick Presenzano, a member of Genovese family who was active in the narcotics trade in the Fulton Market area.

In 1983, Cerrella was released from prison and continued working the Vincent Romano. In 1998, Cerrella was indicted along with Vincent Romano and others on illegal gambling charges. After his release from prison Cerrella became a made member of the Lucchese family joined the family's Brooklyn crew. In 2002, Cerrella was indicted along with consigliere Joseph Caridi, soldier Vincent Salanardi and others. The group was charged with extorting the Hudson & McCoy Fish House restaurant in Freeport, Long Island. On November 27, 2009, Cerrella was released from prison. In 2011, the FBI discovered a list of contacts that included Cerrella and others in Bonanno family soldier Mike Virtuoso's butcher shop on Graham Avenue in Williamsburg, Brooklyn. In May 2014, the FBI observed a sit-down on Long Island between Cerrella, his capo John Castellucci and Long Island capo Carmine Avellino and a member in Avellino's crew soldier, named Michael DeSantis, over an illegal criminal activity between DeSantis, Cerrella and Castellucci.

=== George Conte ===
George "Georgie Goggles" Conte (born July 25, 1960) is a soldier, and former capo and longtime member of the Brooklyn faction. In 1991, Conte along with other capos inducted five new members into the crime family. The ceremony was held in a Howard Beach, Queens and Conte filled in for capo George Zappola and sponsored Frank Gioia Jr. In January 1996, Conte and George Zappola were indicted and charged with murdering James D. Bishop, the former head of the painters union and the murder of a mob boss in California. In 1996, Conte was indicted along with soldier James Galione and other members on drug dealing charges in Brooklyn. In 1996, Conte was convicted of three additional murders based on the testimony of Frank Gioia Jr. He was released from prison on March 10, 2014.

=== Michael Corcione ===
Michael "Mikey Bones" Corcione is a soldier and former acting capo in Domenico Cutaia's crew. In 2008, Corcione was indicted along with capo Domenico Cutaia, soldiers John Baudanza, Salvatore Cutaia, associates Steven Lapella, Victor Sperber, Louis Colello, and John Rodopolous on loansharking, illegal gambling and extortion charges. On July 3, 2012, Corcione was released from prison.

=== Tindaro Corso ===
Tindaro "Tino" Corso (born 1961) is a soldier and former acting capo of the "Prince Street crew" with operations from Staten Island and Manhattan. Corso was indicted along with Anthony Tortorello in 1997. On May 31, 2017, Corso along with Street Boss Matthew Madonna, Underboss Steven Crea Sr., Consigliere Joseph DiNapoli, Capo Steven Crea Jr., Capo Dominic Truscello, Capo John Castelucci, Soldier(s) Joseph Venice, James Maffucci, Joseph Datello, Paul Cassano, Christopher Londonio and Associate(s) Terrence Caldwell, Vincent Bruno, Brian Vaughan, Carmine Garcia, Richard O'Connor, Robert Camilli and John Incatasciato were indicted and charged with racketeering, murder, narcotics (cocaine, heroin, marijuana, prescription medication), and firearms offenses. The indictment builds on charges previously filed against Lucchese soldier Christopher Londonio and Lucchese associate Terrence Caldwell who were charged in February 2017 with racketeering offenses, including the murder of Michael Meldish in the Bronx on November 15, 2013. He was later sentenced to 30 months in prison on racketeering conspiracy. Corso was released from prison on October 29, 2021.

=== Anthony Croce ===
Anthony "Sonny" Croce (born December 24, 1932) is a soldier and former acting capo. In November 2008, Croce was arrested for running a sport gambling ring operating in the Bronx and Manhattan. In October 2009, Croce along with Joseph DiNapoli, Matthew Madonna, Gary Medure, Michael Guerriero and 24 other associates of the Lucchese family were indicted on bribery, loansharking, gun trafficking, extortion, gambling and racketeering charges. In November 2009, Croce was indicted in "Operation Night Gallery" along with soldier Joseph Datello on illegal gambling charges. He controlled the sports gambling operations from Datello's bar "Night Gallery" in New Dorp, Staten Island. The indictment also stated Croce would have conversations with mobsters on the streets of the Financial District and the Staten Island Ferry. On December 21, 2009, he was released from prison.

=== Salvatore Cutaia ===
Salvatore Cutaia is a soldier. He was a member of his father Domenico Cutaia's crew. His son Joseph Cutaia is an associate in the Lucchese family. In 2008, Cutaia and his father were indicted, along with soldiers John Baudanza and Michael Corcione, as well as associates Steven Lapella, Victor Sperber, and Louis Colello, on loansharking, illegal gambling, and extortion charges. On February 24, 2010, Cutaia, his father, and his son Joseph, were indicted alongside soldier Carlo Profeta, associates Eric Maione, Nicholas Bernardo, Jerome Carameilli, and John Rodopolous, and Bonanno family capo Anthony Mannone, on racketeering and extortion charges. Cutaia was released from prison on September 14, 2016.

=== Patrick Dellorusso ===
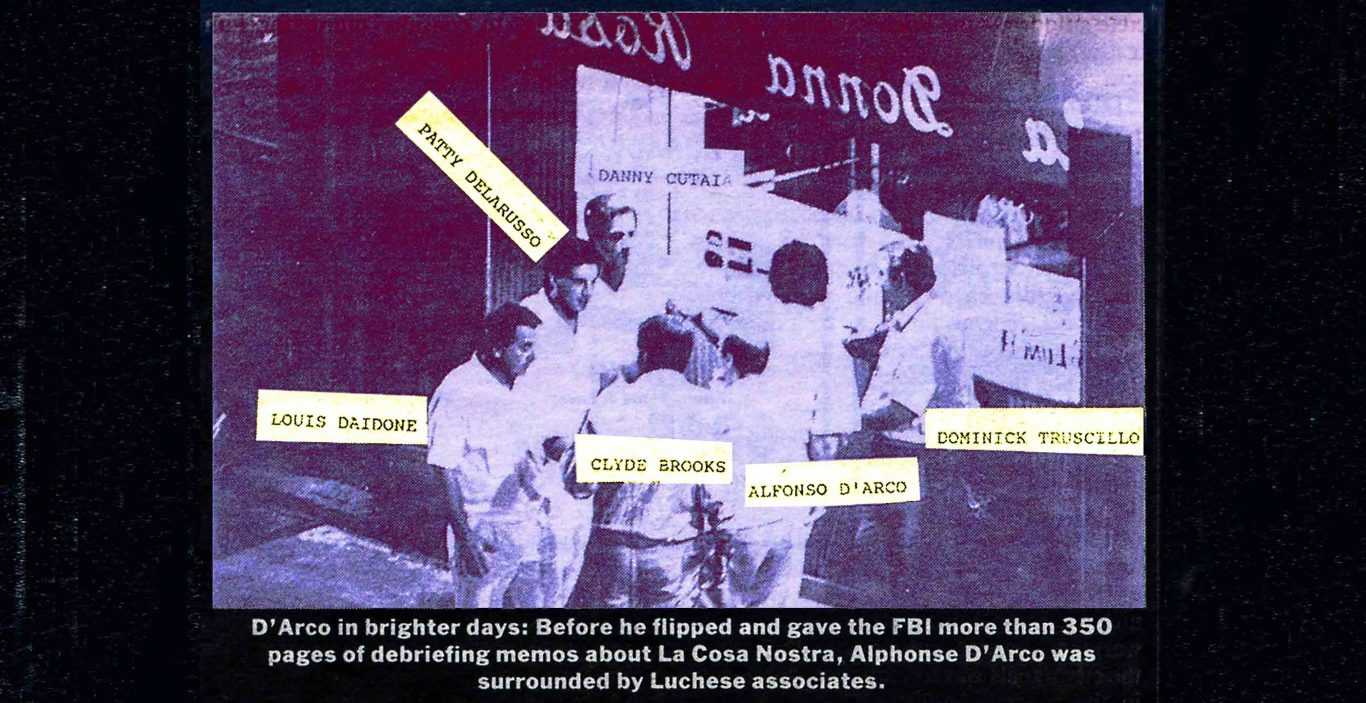
FBI surveillance photo of Danny Cutaia, Patty Dellorusso, Louis Daidone, Dominick Truscello, Alphonse D'Arco and Clyde Brooks

Patrick "Patty" Dellorusso, also known as Patty "Red" Dello Russo, is a former capo. He served as acting underboss during 2017 until 2020. Dellorusso is a longtime member of the old Vario crew from Brooklyn. On February 5, 1989, Dellorusso along with Louis Daidone and another associate shot and killed Lucchese associate Thomas "Red" Gilmore on the orders of boss Vic Amuso, who had become suspicious of Gilmore being an informant. In February 1991, Dellorusso along with Thomas "Tommy Red" Anzellotto murdered Larry Taylor who was a close associate of former Lucchese soldier Bruno Facciola. In early 1991, Amuso transferred Patty Dellorusso, a soldier in charge of running the airport rackets from Al D'Arco crew into Anthony Baratta's crew. In September 1991, during Alfonso D'Arco declaration he told the federal government that Patrick Dellorusso was the head of Lucchese family's rackets in the air-freight industry. D'Arco also stated that Dellorusso controlled Lucchese family associate Anthony Razza who has served as the secretary-treasurer of Local 851. Dellorusso is a former shop steward at Local 295, and a former labor relations director for the Amerford International Corporation, an air-freight company. In 1993, Dellorusso was indicted along with Anthony Calagna on money laundering and witness tampering chargers. The indictment stated that Dellorusso along with others were involved in union corruption involving air freight companies in New York and Chicago; the group extorted three Teamsters locals; two in New York local 295 and local 851 and the third was local 705 in Chicago. Dellorusso was also accused of conspiring to murder a Lucchese associate, Vladimir Jadick, who had cooperated with law enforcement officials. Dellorusso was later barred by the courts to any membership to the national teamsters administrator's.

In May 2019, law-enforcement agents stated that Dellorusso became the family's new acting underboss in 2017, when imprisoned boss Vic Amuso changed the family's leadership. During May 2019, testimony of government witness John Pennisi it was revealed that in 2017, Dellorusso instructed Pennisi to reach out to Amuso's son-in-law Joseph DiBenedetto about sending a message to his father-in-law Amuso. Dellorusso wanted the message sent to Amuso to inform Amuso that he and Michael DeSantis were ready to take over the leadership of the family after Matthew Madonna and Steven Crea were arrested. When Pennisi went to speak to his friend Joseph DiBenedetto about the message for Dellorusso, he learned that Eugene Castelle was requesting a message sent to Amuso about Castelle's own ability to take over the leadership of the family. Pennisi learned that Dellorusso sent a letter to Amuso in prison and received a letter back with Amuso's approval for Dellorusso and DeSantis to take over the administration positions.

=== Michael DeSantis ===
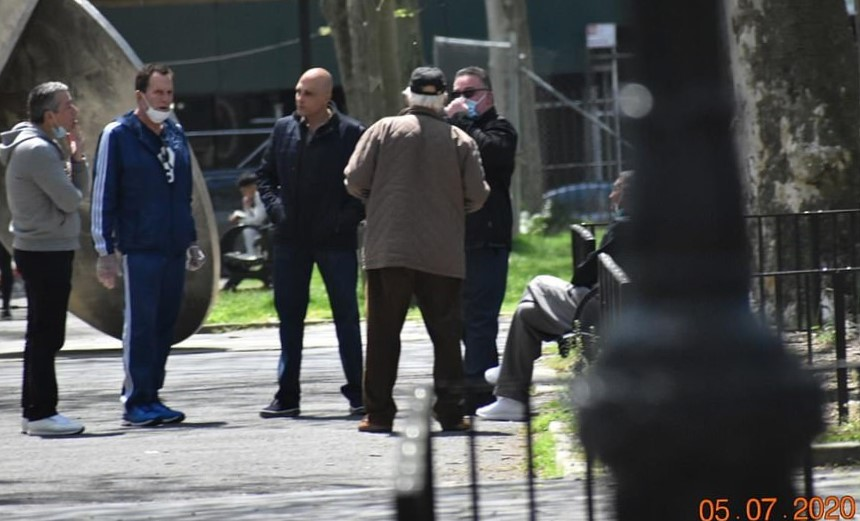
FBI surveillance photo of Lucchese family members on May 7, 2020, meeting in Jefferson Park. From left Andrew DiSimoe, Mike DeSantis (blue track) Anthony Villani, Anthony Baratta, George Zappola, Frank Salerno

Michael "Big Mike" DeSantis is the current acting boss of the family. DeSantis is a member of the Brooklyn faction and a supporter of Vic Amuso. In November 1989, DeSantis was inducted into the crime family along with Richie Pagliarulo, Frank Federico, and two others, with the ceremony being conducted by boss Vic Amuso, underboss Anthony Casso, and capos Al D'Arco, Sal Avellino, Peter Chiodo, Bobby Amuso, Frank Lastorino, and Anthony Baratta. On September 18, 1991, DeSantis, along with capos Anthony Baratta and Frank Lastorino and soldier Frankie Frederico, conspired to kill Alphonse D'Arco in the Kimberly Hotel in Manhattan, but failed. DeSantis walked into the hotel wearing a bulletproof vest and a gun in his waistband, but D'Arco spotted the gun. While DeSantis went to hide the gun in the bathroom, D'Arco made his escape, eventually defecting and becoming a government witness. In April 1993, Michael DeSantis was indicted and jailed along with Frank Lastorino and Richard Pagliarulo on murder conspiracy, extortion, and other racketeering charges. DeSantis served 18 years in prison for his involvement in two 1980s murders for the boss. On June 28, 2010, he was released from prison. In May 2014, the FBI observed a sit-down on Long Island between then-soldier Michael DeSantis, along with his capo Carmine Avellino, and capo John Castellucci and John Cerrella, a member of Castellucci’s crew, over an illegal criminal activity between DeSantis, Cerrella and Castellucci. DeSantis violated his parole restrictions during the sit-down but did not return to prison because he had a shoulder replacement surgery and was able to stay in home detention until his parole restriction ended on June 28, 2015.

During the May 2019 testimony of government witness John Pennisi, it was revealed that in 2017, imprisoned-for-life boss Vic Amuso sent a letter to underboss Steven Crea stating that DeSantis would take over as acting boss, replacing Bronx-based Matthew Madonna. If Amuso's orders were not followed, he approved of murdering a number of Bronx faction members. DeSantis took over as acting boss after Madonna and Crea both stepped down and agreed to Amuso's orders. In May 2020, DeSantis was identified in an FBI surveillance photo meeting with a number of fellow Lucchese mobsters, including his consigliere Andrew DeSimone, caporegimes Frank Salerno and George Zappola, and soldiers Anthony Villani and Anthony Baratta, in Jefferson Park.

=== Joseph DeSena ===
Joseph "Joe Cafe" DeSena is a capo operating from Caffe Napoli in Little Italy. DeSena began his criminal career as an associate in the Gambino family before becoming a member of the Lucchese family. In the early 2010s, DeSena was an associate of Gambino family capo Ignazio "Uncle Iggy" Alonga. His nephew Pete Tuccio is a Gambino family associate and the former driver for Philadelphia boss Joseph Merlino.

=== Joseph DiBenedetto ===
Joseph "Little Joe" DiBenedetto is a soldier in the family's "Brooklyn crew". DiBenedetto is the son-in-law of boss Vic Amuso. In May 2000, DiBenedetto was indicted along with capo Joseph Tangorra, associate Joseph Fama and Andrew Steckler on loansharking charges. In 2001, he was charged along with capo Josph Tangorra and Joel Goldman with looting union pension funds, extortion, loan-sharking and received a no-show job from one of the two construction companies named in the indictment. The charges also claimed DiBenedetto serve as a shop steward for the Cement and Concrete Workers Local 20. In 2002, he was indicted along with underboss Steven Crea, capo Dominic Truscello and soldier Domenico Cutaia on loansharking and construction racketeering charges. It was revealed during the trial that both DiBenedetto and Vic Amuso held hidden interest in DiFama Concrete, and prosecutors identified the owner of DiFama Concrete, Joseph Fama as an associate in the Lucchese family. On October 28, 2008, he was released from prison. In 2019, government witness John Pennisi revealed that in 2017 he was requested by Patrick Dellorusso to reached out to fellow Brooklyn crew member and childhood friend Joseph DiBenedetto. Pennisi was supposed to have DiBenedetto pass on a message to his father-in-law Vic Amuso about the interests of Patrick Dellorusso and Michael DeSantis taking over the administration positions in the family. When Pennisi went to speak to DiBenedetto about the message for Dellorusso, he learned that Eugene Castelle was requesting a message sent to Amuso about Castelle's own ability to take over the leadership of the family. Pennisi testified that DiBenedetto was upset about all the Brooklyn members who had been contacting in efforts to send messages to Amuso.

=== Andrew DiSimone ===
Andrew DiSimone (sometimes spelled DeSimone) is the former consigliere in the family. His father was former Lucchese family capo Salvatore DiSimone. On October 1, 2009, DiSimone was indicted along with soldier Dominic Capelli and associate John Alevis on bribery and illegal gambling charges. The bribery charges dated back to 2006 and 2007 when DiSimone and others tried to bribe a NYPD sergeant and a detective, who were posing undercover in "Operation Open House" as corrupt officers, to protect illegal gambling operations around the city. On August 7, 2013, DiSimone was released from prison. In May 2019, law-enforcement agents stated that Andrew DeSimone became the family's new Consigliere in 2017, when imprisoned boss Vic Amuso changed the family's leadership. In May 2020, DeSimone was identified in an FBI surveillance photo meeting with Lucchese members acting boss Mike DeSantis, caporegimes Frank Salerno and George Zappola and soldiers Anthony Villani and Anthony Baratta in Jefferson Park.

=== James Galione ===
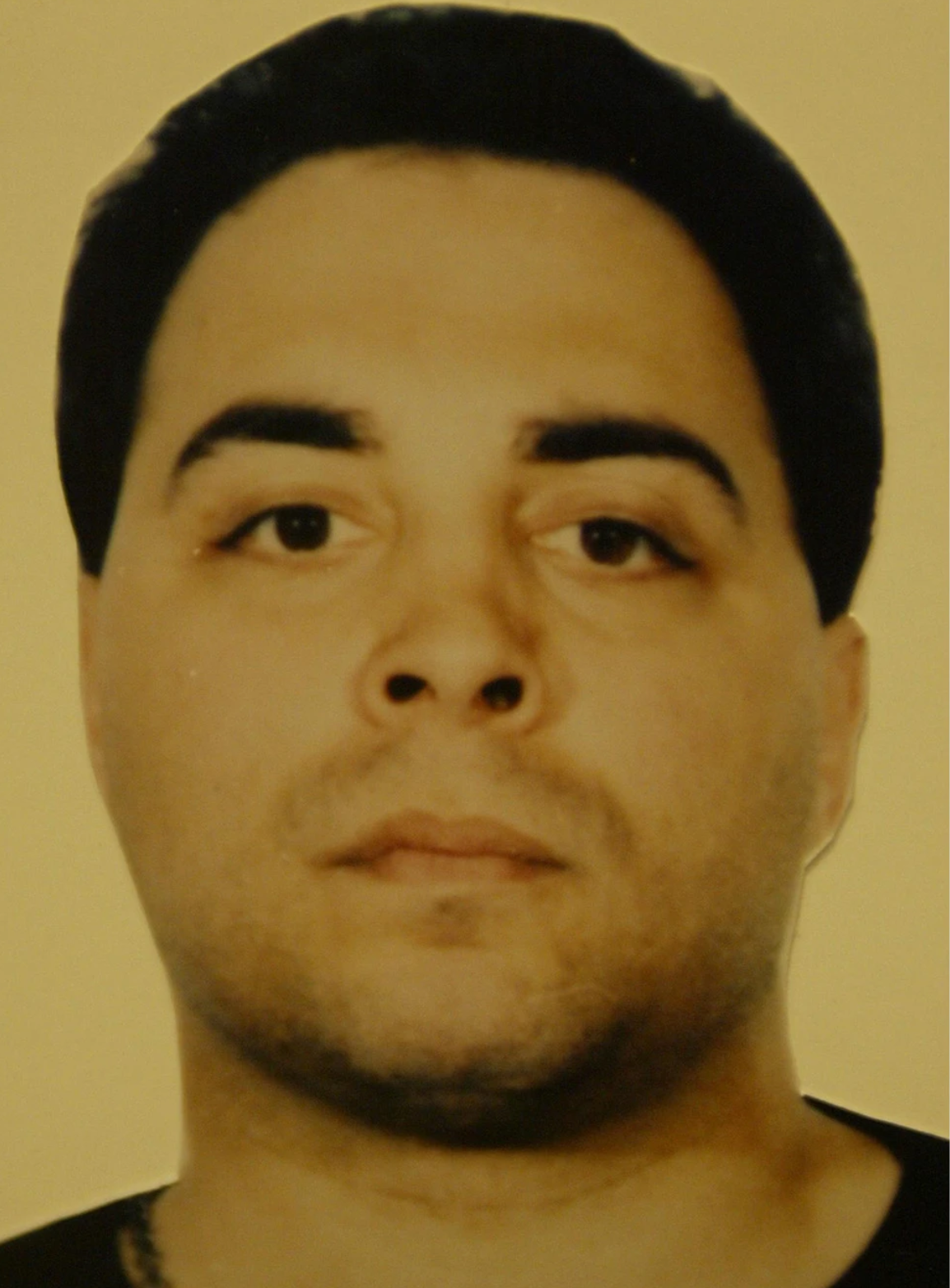
James Galione

James "Jimmy Frogs" Galione is a soldier. In October 1996, Galione was indicted and charged with running a crack-cocaine ring that operated in Bensonhurst and Bay Ridge, Brooklyn since 1992. In 1997, Galione and Lucchese family associate Mario Gallo pleaded guilty to the 1989 murder of Bonanno family associate Constable "Gus" Farace. In 1997, Galione pleaded guilty to murder, firearms and drug-trafficking charges and was sentenced to 22 years in prison. He was released from prison on December 24, 2015.

=== Louis Gampero ===
Louis Gampero. In March 2001, Gampero along with Ray Argentina were charged with racketeering, mail fraud, wire fraud and bank fraud. On April 11, 2008, Gampero was released from prison. On July 10, 2017, Gampero was observed by a law enforcement surveillance team meeting with Gambino crime family capo Andrew Campos in the Pelham Bay diner.

=== Thomas Gelardo ===
Thomas "TJ" Gelardo (1942) is a soldier in the Bronx faction, who lives in Tuckahoe, New York. On May 22, 1984, Gelardo along with Daniel Meyers were convicted of extorting a social club used for gambling and promoting illegal gambling. The extortion dated back to July and December 1982, when Gelardo and Meyers began beating and threatening Alfred Ciarcia, a bookie for control of the Rainbow Social Club, in Mount Vernon. On July 18, 2006, Gelardo pleaded guilty of filing false income tax returns, health care fraud, and mail fraud. On April 19, 2007, Gelardo was sentenced to a year in prison for conspiring with a Brooklyn doctor to defraud the IRS and to fraudulently obtain benefits from Local 348. On May 2, 2008, Gelardo was released from prison. In June 2014, his nephew Thomas Gelardo was on trial for assaulting his porn star ex-girlfriend.

=== Joseph Giampa ===
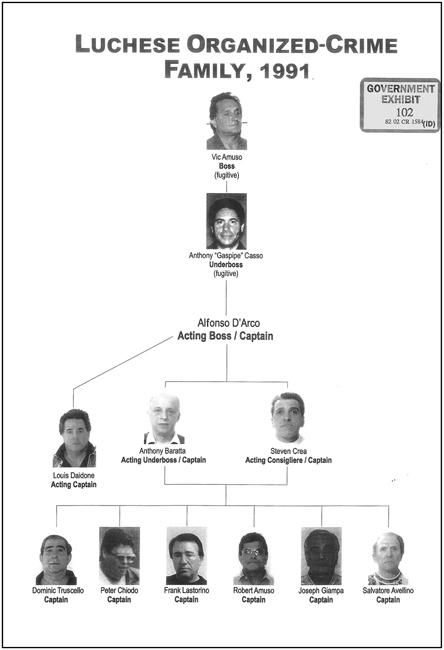
Lucchese crime family - Chart 1991

Joseph "Joey" Giampa a former capo operating in the Bronx. Giampa ran an auto shop on Boston Post Road in the Bronx. Along with his brother Santo "Jay" Giampa, he ran a loan sharking racket in Hunts Point Markets in the Bronx. In 1982, Giampa was inducted into the Lucchese family. In 1990, Giampa was order by Vic Amuso and Anthony Casso to murder his capo Michael Salerno. After Salerno was murdered Giampa was promoted to capo of the old Salerno crew. On May 23, 1992, Giampa was arrested along with his brother Santo Giampapa and charged of murder of Michael Salerno. In 1992, Giampa and his brother were acquitted of the murder charges. In December 1993, Giampa and his stepson Gennaro Vittorio decided to trust Richard Sabol, a government informant in establishing a company to import and export large amounts of heroin and cocaine in Bergen County, New Jersey. Giampa then began planning with capo Anthony Baratta to smuggle drugs and firearms into New Jersey. In February 1994, Gennaro Vittorio learned from New York City police officer Vincent Davis that Sabol was a government informant. In August 1994, Giampa was indicted along with Gennaro Vittorio, Joseph Gaito, Guy Fatato, Benjamin Segarra, Louis Dorval, Elliot Porco, and John Capra on racketeering charges. In 1994, his brother Santo Giampapa died of natural causes. In August 1995, Giampa was found guilty of conspiring to establish gambling operations and racketeering in New Jersey. In 2000, after the Lucchese Construction Group indictment, Giampa was identified as a capo in the family, when Anthony Pezzullo a soldier in his crew was arrested along with Steven Crea and others. On September 21, 2001, Giampa was released from prison.

=== Joseph Lubrano ===
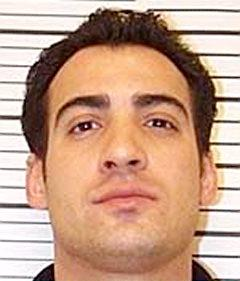
Joseph Lubrano

Joseph "Joey Relay" Lubrano (born October 26, 1970, New York), also known as "Giovanni", "John", "Big Joe" is a capo in the family with ties to mobsters on Arthur Avenue in The Bronx. Lubrano's crew operates around the Bronx, Manhattan, Staten Island and Westchester. In 1996, Lubrano was wrongfully sent to prison for beating a black police officer in 1994 and was released two years later. During the trial, it was alleged that Lubrano was a member of the Lucchese recruitment gang, The Tanglewood Boys. In 1997, Darin Mazzarella, a member of the Tanglewood Boys became a federally protected witness. Mazzarella gave information to investigators and prosecutors about the Lubrano assault; he admitted participating in the assault with Alfred "Freddy Boy" Santorelli, the son of Anthony Santorelli, and asserted that Lubrano was not a Tanglewood member.

In May 2010, Lubrano was listed on wanted poster by the FBI for armed robbery and racketeering. The FBI identified Lubrano as a capo with close ties to mobster in Arthur Ave area of the Bronx. Lubrano had been charged in an indictment and charged with armed robberies in and around New York City and an illegal bookmaking operation. On September 11, 2010, Lubrano was captured in Yonkers, New York in girlfriend's home. He was later convicted and sentenced to 57 months in federal prison. Lubrano was released from prison on October 31, 2014.

In 2016, it was revealed by government informant Anthony Zoccolillo that in 2001, Lubrano and Steven Crea Jr. were partners in a Bronx gambling club. Informant Zoccolillo also stated that both Lubrano and Crea Jr. started their criminal careers in the Tanglewood Boys recruitment gang. In March 2024, his 31-year-old daughter Amanda Lubrano, received a prison term of 22 months for selling a kilogram of cocaine to an undercover.

=== James Maffucci ===
James "Jimmy the Jew" Maffucci (1948) is a soldier. On May 31, 2017, Maffucci along with Street Boss Matthew Madonna, Underboss Steven Crea Sr. and others were indicted and charged with racketeering, murder and other crimes. He was sentenced to 37 months in prison for extortion and extortionate extension of credit. On October 1, 2021, Maffucci was released from prison.

=== Frank Papagni ===
Frank "Frankie Bones" Papagni (born July 18, 1957) is the current underboss of the family. Papagni is a longtime Brooklyn faction member. In 1991, Papagni attended a making ceremony in Howard Beach, Queens. At the induction ceremony, a man he called his cousin Frank Gioia Jr. became a member of the Lucchese family. In 1993, Papagni along with George Zappola and Frank Gioia Jr. plotted to have Steven Crea killed. In 1993, he was convicted of fraud, extortion and attempted murder, including a plot to kill John A. “Junior” Gotti. Papagni served as consigliere in the mid-1990s. In 1996, Papagni was indicted along with George Zappola, George Conte and Frank Giacobbe on murder charges. The 1996, indictment charged Papagni with two 1992 murders: the first was the murder of Gambino crime family associate Frank Mariconda and the second was the murder of Richard Taglianetti. Papagni would later receive a 20-year prison sentence. Government informant Frank Gioia Jr. later testified that he helped Papagni murder Frank Mariconda, who had disrespected Papagni's girlfriend in a bar. He was released from prison on November 24, 2015.

=== John Perna ===
John G. Perna (born May 26, 1977) is a soldier and son of Ralph V. Perna. His brothers Joseph and Ralph M. are members of the New Jersey faction. On April 13, 2006, Perna was released from prison. In November 2007, John and his brother Joseph were made into the Lucchese family. On December 18, 2007, Perna along with his father Ralph V., his brothers Joseph and Ralph M., and other members and associates of the New Jersey faction were arrested on gambling, money laundering and racketeering charges. On May 14, 2010, Perna was indicted along with thirty three other members and associates of the New Jersey faction on the 2007 charges of gambling, money laundering and racketeering. In January 2016, John along with his brother Joseph each received 10 year sentences, while his father Ralph V. received an eight-year state prison sentence for pleading guilty to running a multibillion-dollar gambling enterprise, and his brother Ralph M. had charges still pending. He was released from prison on July 15, 2019.

On June 30, 2020, Perna was indicted on assault charges along with Thomas Manzo, who is the ex-husband of a 'Real Housewives of New Jersey' Star. On December 16, 2020, John Perna pled guilty to planning and carrying out an aggravated assault against the current husband of one of the former stars of the Bravo television show “The Real Housewives of New Jersey”. Perna carried out the assault on July 18, 2015, armed with a "slapjack". In exchange for committing the assault, Perna received a large discount for his wedding reception, which was held at Thomas Manzo's Brownstone Restaurant in Paterson, New Jersey. Perna awaited sentencing which happened on April 28, 2021 and carried a maximum potential penalty of 20 years in prison and a $250,000 fine. On June 10, 2021, Perna was sentenced to 30 months in prison for planning and carrying out an aggravated assault. Perna was released from prison on February 18, 2024.

On April 11, 2025, Perna was charged along with 38 others with racketeering, gambling offenses, money laundering, and other crimes. Those charged along with Perna included Lucchese ruling panel member George "Georgie Neck" Zappola, New Jersey capo Joseph R. Perna, associate Wayne D. Cross among other associates which included a New Jersey Politician Prospect Park councilman Anand Shah.

On June 23, 2026, John G. Perna along with his cousin Joseph R. Perna, and George Zappola, with associates Wayne D. Cross, Michael P. Frasso, Frank Imparato, Joseph Gossweiler and Peter Norcia all pleaded guilty for their roles in a racketeering, gambling, and money laundering operation in New Jersey. The three members of the Lucchese family John G. Perna, Joseph R. Perna, and George Zappola, pleaded guilty to second-degree racketeering with recommended sentences of seven years in state prison.

=== Joseph M. Perna ===
Joseph M. "Little Joe" Perna (born October 31, 1969) is a soldier and son of Ralph V. Perna. Perna is currently the acting capo of the New Jersey crew with his cousin Joseph Perna. He is a former member of the Brooklyn faction. His brothers John and Ralph M. are members of the New Jersey faction. On May 18, 2006, Perna was released from prison. On November 10, 2007, in his Toms River home his brother John and his cousin Joseph R. Perna were made into the Lucchese family by Joseph DiNapoli and Matthew Madonna and other members of the family's hierarchy. On December 18, 2007, Perna along with his father Ralph V., his brothers John and Ralph M., his wife Roseanna and other members and associates of the New Jersey faction were arrested on gambling, money laundering and racketeering charges. On May 14, 2010, Perna was indicted along with thirty three other members and associates of the New Jersey faction on the 2007 charges of gambling, money laundering and racketeering. The indictment revealed that Perna and Michael Cetta financed a scheme to smuggle drugs and cell phones into East Jersey State Prison with members of the Nine Trey Gangsters (a set of the Bloods) and a corrupt corrections officer. In January 2016, Joseph and his brother John Perna each received 10 year sentences, while his father Ralph V. Perna received an eight-year state prison sentence for pleading guilty to running a multibillion-dollar gambling enterprise, and his brother Ralph M. had charges still pending. He was released from prison on December 15, 2019. Perna is a close friend of Philadelphia crime family boss Joseph Merlino.

On November 13, 2025, Perna along with thirteen others were indicted for running a multimillion New Jersey-based bookmaking and sports gambling network. Those charged alongside Joseph M. Perna, included his two sons Joseph R. Perna, and Anthony M. Perna, his stepson Frank Zito, his nephews Dominic Perna and Michael Cetta, his wife Kimberly Zito and his ex-wife Rosanna Magno among others. The network's illegal gambling profits between 2022 to 2024 was approximately $2 million. Among the athletes who participated in Perna's sports gambling ring were former Rutgers University wrestlers Michael Cetta, who was previously an NCAA state champion for New Jersey, and Nicholas Raimo.

=== Joseph R. Perna ===
Joseph R. "Big Joe" Perna is the current captain of the New Jersey faction. He served as acting capo of the crew under George Zappola. His father Michael J. Perna was a powerful member of the New Jersey faction before his death. On November 10, 2007, Perna was inducted in the Lucchese family along with his cousin John Perna inside of the Toms River home of his cousin Joseph M. Perna. On April 11, 2025, Perna along with 38 other members and associates of the Lucchese crime family New Jersey faction, were charged with racketeering, gambling offenses, money laundering, and other crimes. Those charged along Perna included Lucchese ruling panel member George "Georgie Neck" Zappola, soldier John G. Perna, associate Wayne D. Cross among other associates which included a New Jersey Politician Prospect Park councilman Anand Shah.

On June 23, 2026, Joseph R. Perna along with his cousin John G. Perna, and George Zappola, with associates Wayne D. Cross, Michael P. Frasso, Frank Imparato, Joseph Gossweiler and Peter Norcia all pleaded guilty for their roles in a racketeering, gambling, and money laundering operation in New Jersey. The three members of the Lucchese family Joseph R. Perna, John G. Perna, and George Zappola, pleaded guilty to second-degree racketeering with recommended sentences of seven years in state prison.

=== Ralph V. Perna ===
Ralph Vito "Ralphie" Perna (born April 15, 1946) is the former capo of the New Jersey faction. Perna's father Joseph Perna was a mob bookmaker and shylock during the 1960s operating from Newark, New Jersey. His brother Michael J. Perna was also a member of the New Jersey faction. Perna's three sons Joseph, John and Ralph M. are members of the New Jersey faction. On August 18, 2006, Perna was released from prison. On December 18, 2007, Perna along with Joseph DiNapoli, Matthew Madonna, Martin Taccetta, his three sons Joseph, John, Ralph M. and twenty five other members and associates of the New Jersey faction were arrested on gambling, money laundering and racketeering charges. The arrests resulted from the investigation "Operation Heat", which alleged that the New Jersey faction ran an illegal gambling operation that earned approximately $2.2 billion over a 15-month period and smuggled drugs and pre-paid cell phones into a New Jersey prison. On May 14, 2010, Perna was indicted along with DiNapoli, Madonna and twenty nine other members and associates of the New Jersey faction on the 2007 charges of gambling, money laundering and racketeering. According to the indictment Perna "allegedly became top capo of the New Jersey faction of the family when Nicky Scarfo Jr. was deposed in 2007". In 2012, New Jersey state began investigating the possibility of money laundering for legal costs in Perna's case. In January 2016, Ralph V. received an eight-year state prison sentence for pleading guilty to running a multibillion-dollar gambling enterprise, while two of his sons, John and Joseph, each received 10 year sentences. His third son, Ralph M., had charges still pending.

=== Carlo Profeta ===
Carlo Profeta (born October 10, 1942) is a soldier and former acting capo in Domenico Cutaia's crew. He once served as a bodyguard to Gambino family mobster Roy DeMeo. On October 2, 1984, Profeta was indicted on federal racketeering charges relating to the activities of the DeMeo crew.

In early 2009, Profeta had a sitdown with Bonanno family capo Anthony Mannone about a Lucchese soldier who owed him $200,000 in a loanshark debt. On February 24, 2010, Profeta was indicted along with capo Domenico Cutaia, soldier Salvatore Cutaia, associates Joseph Cutaia, Eric Maione and Nicholas Bernardo, Bonanno family capo Anthony Mannone and associate Jerome Carameilli on racketeering and extortion charges. In February 2011, Profeta and associate Eric Maione pleaded guilty to extortion charges. On July 23, 2013, Profeta was released from prison.

=== Alfred Santorelli ===
Alfred "Freddy Boy" Santorelli is a soldier and acting capo of his father's Bronx crew. His father is Lucchese family capo Anthony Santorelli. In the 1990s, Santorelli and Darin Mazzarelli were the leaders of the Tanglewood Boys, a recruitment gang for the Lucchese family. In 1994, his father Anthony Santorelli was observed by an FBI agent, dumping evidence in the murder of Louis Balancio. On November 14, 2001, Santorelli was released from prison.

=== Anthony Santorelli ===
Anthony "Blue Eyes" Santorelli is a capo operating in Westchester and the Bronx. In the 1990s, Santorelli led The Tanglewood Boys, a recruitment gang for the Lucchese family. His son Alfred "Freddy Boy" Santorelli was a member of the gang. In 1994, Santorelli was observed by an FBI agent, dumping something into a garbage can, which turned out to be clothes covered in blood. A DNA check on the blood led to members of the gang being arrested for murdering college student Louis Balancio at a Yonkers sports bar. In 2000, after the Lucchese Construction Group indictment, Santorelli was identified as a capo in the family, when a soldier in his crew Joseph Truncale was arrested along with Steven Crea and others. In December 2003, his older brother Leonard Santorelli, the owner of CMS, a company that prints and distribute bank reports and documents was under investigation by law enforcement agencies in London and New York for allegedly bribing merchant banks to win contracts and his ties to his brother Anthony Santorelli.

=== Carlo Taccetta ===
Carlo Taccetta (born July 10, 1972) is a soldier and son of Michael Taccetta the former capo of the New Jersey faction. In 2004, the New Jersey Commission of Investigation stated that Carlo Taccetta began to take over after his father was imprisoned but New York leaders did not recognize his role. He was imprisoned on weapons charge and released on November 29, 2004. On January 26, 2014, Taccetta was arrested with 65 pounds of marijuana. He was charged with possession and possession with intent to distribute marijuana. He was released from prison on February 13, 2020.

=== Joseph Tangorra ===
Joseph "Joey Flowers" Tangorra (born August 2, 1949) is a soldier, and former capo of the "Bensonhurst Crew". In September 2000, Tangorra was indicted along with acting boss Steven Crea, capo Dominic Truscello and other members of the Lucchese Construction Group on labor racketeering charges. Tangorra was identified as a captain of a Brooklyn crew, which included associates Andrew Reynolds, Alessandro Palmeri and Giuseppe Palmeri. In November 2000, Tangorra was indicted along with soldier Joseph Truncale and was charged with the 1988 murder of Victor Filocamo. In June 2001, his wife Carol Ann Tangorra wrote a letter on behalf of her husband who had been denied bail. Tangorra was released from prison December 9, 2014.

=== Joseph Tortorello ===
Joseph "Torty Jr." Tortorello is the capo of "Prince Street crew. His father Anthony "Torty" Tortorello was the former capo in the family. In October 1991, Tortorello was made into the Lucchese family along with Thomas D'Ambrosia, Frank Gioia Jr., Gregory Cappello and Jody Calabrese in a Howard Beach, Queens ceremony conducted by his father Anthony Tortorello, Frank Lastorino, Anthony Baratta, Salvatore Avellino, Richard Pagliarulo, George Conte, Thomas Anzellotto and Frank Papagni. His father sponsored him during the ceremony. Tortorello later went on to control a drug operation in lower Manhattan before getting arrested along with Thomas D'Ambrosia.

=== Joseph Venice ===
Joseph Venice (1961) is a soldier in the Bronx faction. On May 31, 2017, Venice along with Street Boss Matthew Madonna, Underboss Steven Crea Sr., Consigliere Joseph DiNapoli, Capo Steven Crea Jr., and others were indicted and charged with racketeering, murder and other crimes. Venice pleaded guilty to racketeering conspiracy and was sentenced to 18 months in prison. On May 8, 2020, Venice was released from federal prison.

=== Anthony Villani ===
Anthony Villani born in September 1964. Villani is a capo operating in the Bronx and Westchester. In May 2020, Villani was identified in an FBI surveillance photo meeting with Lucchese members acting boss Mike DeSantis, consigliere Andrew DeSimone, caporegimes Frank Salerno and George Zappola, and soldier Anthony Baratta in Jefferson Park. On September 13, 2022, Villani and associates James "Quick" Coumoutsos, Dennis Filizzola, Michael "Platinum" Praino, and Louis "Tooch" Tucci Jr. were indicted on charges of operating a large-scale illegal online gambling business under the protection of the Luchese family for more than 15 years. The illegal gambling business known as “Rhino Sports,” utilized an offshore website and dozens of bookmakers in the New York area to take millions in illegal sports bets.

On July 9, 2025, Villani was sentenced by former U.S. District Judge Kiyo A. Matsumoto to 21 months in prison with $4 million in forfeiture for racketeering, extortion, money laundering and illegal gambling related to his involvement with an illegal online gambling business. During his sentencing the New York District Attorney's Office identified Villani as a capo in the family who supervised the gambling operation "Rhino Sports" based in Costa Rica from 2004 through December 2020, making an estimated $35 million in illicit profits during his time and ordered him to pay $4 million in forfeiture. The New York District Attorney's Office estimated that Villani profited at least $15 million personally while controlling the illegal gambling operation.

=== Rocco Vitulli ===
Rocco Vitulli is a soldier. On August 10, 1989, Vitulli along with Frank Federico murdered Robert M. Kubecka and Donald Barstow, two executives of a trash-collection company in East Northport, New York. In 1995, Vitulli was indicted along with Salvatore Avellino, Carmine Avellino, Anthony Baratta and Frank Federico for the murders of Robert Kubecka and Donald Barstow. Vitulli was released from prison on September 7, 2000.

=== George Zappola ===
George "Georgie Neck" Zappola (born 1960) is a former captain of the Brooklyn-Staten Island crew and the Jersey Crew operating from Brooklyn and Red Bank, New Jersey. He was a close ally to Anthony Casso and a powerful member of the Brooklyn faction. In the late 1980s, Zappola and Alfonse D'Arco murdered Lucchese capo Michael Pappadio after he refused to give up control of his garment district rackets. After surprising Pappadio in a bagel shop, Zappola shot him in the head with a.22-caliber pistol. On May 17, 1990, Zappola and George Conte murdered James Bishop, the former secretary-treasurer of painters union Local 37, who had begun cooperating with the district attorney's office. On November 15, 1990, Zappola along with his two brother Vincent Zappola and Anthony Zappola and the eleven other members of the Bypass gang were indicted for seven bank burglaries.

On November 1, 1992, Zappola was indicted along with Underboss Anthony Casso, soldiers Richard Pagliarulo, Michael DeSantis and Michael Spinelli, and two associates, Thomas Carew and Corrado Marino on charges of racketeering, a dozen murders, extortion and labor corruption. Zappola avoided being arrested and became a fugitive for next few years. In 1993, Zappola along with Frank Papagni and Frank Gioia Jr. plotted to have Steven Crea killed. In 1996, Zappola was indicted along with Frank Papagni, George Conte and Frank Giacobbe on murder charges. In June 1996, Zappola pleaded guilty to several murders, including the 1990 Bishop slaying. Zappola received a 22-year prison sentence. In October 1996, while being held at Metropolitan Detention Center in Sunset Park, Brooklyn, Zappola bribed a federal Bureau of Prisons (BOP) guard $1,000 to smuggle his sperm out of the facility. Zappola was released from prison on March 3, 2014.

In May 2020, Zappola was identified in an FBI surveillance photo meeting with Lucchese members acting boss Mike DeSantis, consigliere Andrew DeSimone, caporegime Frank Salerno and soldiers Anthony Villani and Anthony Baratta in Jefferson Park. Zappola is suspected to become the future acting boss when Mike Desantis steps down. On April 11, 2025, Zappola identified as a member of ruling panel was charged along with 38 others with racketeering, gambling offenses, money laundering, and other crimes. On June 23, 2026, Zappola, Joseph R. Perna, and John G. Perna, with associates Wayne D. Cross, Michael P. Frasso, Frank Imparato, Joseph Gossweiler and Peter Norcia all pleaded guilty for their roles in a racketeering, gambling, and money laundering operation in New Jersey. The three members of the Lucchese family Zappola, John G. Perna, and Joseph R. Perna pleaded guilty to second-degree racketeering with recommended sentences of seven years in state prison.

== Imprisoned members ==
=== Steven D. Crea ===
Steven D. "Stevie Junior" Crea (born 1972) is a former capo. His father Steven Crea is the underboss in the family. Crea started his criminal career in the Tanglewood Boys recruitment gang. In 2016, it was revealed by government informant Anthony Zoccolillo that from 2001 through 2002, Crea and Joseph Lubrano were partners in a Bronx gambling club. His father's main club and base of operations was the Coddington Club in the Bronx.

On May 31, 2017, Steven D. Crea along with Street Boss Matthew Madonna, his father Underboss Steven L. Crea, Consigliere Joseph DiNapoli, Capo Dominic Truscello, Capo John Castelucci, Acting Capo Tindaro Corso and other members were indicted and charged with racketeering, murder and other crimes. The indictment builds on charges previously filed against a reputed Lucchese soldier and associate in February 2017 with the murder of Michael Meldish in the Bronx on November 15, 2013; Matthew Madonna, Steven L. Crea, and Steven L. Crea were charged and suspected of serving as co-conspirators in the Meldish gangland execution too. In November 2018, Crea passed a polygraph exam administered by retired FBI veteran in his defenses efforts to prove his innocence in the 2013 murder of Michael Meldish. On August 20, 2019, Crea pleaded guilty to racketeering and murder conspiracy charges and faces a maximum of 13 years in prison. The murder conspiracy charges date back to 2012, when Crea and his father Steven L. Crea plotted to kill Bonanno family associate Carl Ulzheimer for disrespecting the elder Crea during a Bronx social club encounter. The Crea's assigned Lucchese mobster Vincent Bruno to murder Ulzheimer, but Bruno failed. The dispute was resolved between the two mafia families. On January 31, 2020, Crea was sentenced to 13 years in prison. Crea is currently imprisoned with a projected release date of August 11, 2028.

=== Louis Daidone ===
Louis "Louie Bagels" Daidone (born February 23, 1946), also known as "Louie Cross Bay," is an inducted member who served as a captain, then Consigliere and finally became Acting Boss in the Lucchese family. Daidone was born and raised in Bensonhurst, Brooklyn. Daidone played as a quarter-back for New Utrecht High School and was offered a football scholarship to Indiana State University in 1963, instead Daidone stayed in Bensonhurst. Daidone's nickname "Louie Bagel" is because he owned part of a Howard Beach bagel shop "Bagels by the Bay" on Cross Bay Boulevard where he controlled most of his illegal rackets, he also ran a car service and was heavily active in hijacking cigarettes and tires. He became an associate of the Canarsie crew under Capo Paul Vario. On August 23, 1982, Daidone, Alphonse D'Arco and four other men were made into the Lucchese family, the ceremony was conducted by Boss Anthony Corallo, Underboss Salvatore Santoro, Capo Paul Vario, and members Frank Manzo, Peter DiPalermo, Charles DiPalermo and Salvatore DeSimone.

In late 1988, Lucchese boss Vic Amuso ordered Daidone to murder Lucchese associate Thomas "Red" Gilmore after becoming suspicious of him being an informant. Gilmore ran a chop shop, operated a limousine service and was involved in loansharking operations. On February 5, 1989, Daidone along with Patty Dellorusso and another associate waited for Gilmore near his apartment in Richmond Hills, Queens when they ambushed him and shot him three times in the head and neck.

In August 1990, Anthony Casso gave Frank Lastorino the contract to murder mobster Bruno Facciola after Casso had received information from two NYPD police detectives Louis Eppolito and Stephen Caracappa on his payroll that Facciola was an informant. On August 24, 1990, Frank Lastorino, Louie Daidone and Richard Pagliarulo murdered Bruno Facciola. Lastorino arranged to bring Facciola to a Brooklyn garage, inside the garage Lastorino stabbed Facciola and Pagliarulo shot him six times in the face and chest. Daidone stuffed a dead canary into Facciola's mouth and left his body in the trunk of his 1985 Mercury sedan and abandoned the car on East Fifty-Fifth Street in Canarsie. In early 1991, Daidone was promoted to acting capo of the Canarsie crew when Alponose D'Arco was promoted to acting boss.

On May 1, 1992, Daidone and Robert Molinelli, Raymond Argentina and Alan Taglianetti were convicted of conspiring to rob the Rapid Armored Truck Co. vehicle on March 25, 1988. Daidone was sentenced to five years in prison. The stolen $1.2 million was never recovered. Daidone was paroled in 1996, under orders preventing him from speaking to known criminals for three years, he almost violated his parole when he allegedly contacted Lucchese mobster Raymond Argentina. He was promoted to consigliere during this time.

In 2000, after Steven Crea was indicted on corruption charges, Daidone was promoted to Acting boss of the family. On November 15, 2002, Daidone was charged along with Consigliere Joseph Caridi and twelve others on racketeering and extortion charges of Long Island a strip club Sinderella among other business. In December 2002, Daidone was indicted along with Consigliere Joseph Caridi, acting capo John "Johnny Sideburns" Cerrella, soldier Vincent "Vinny Baldy" Salanardi and twenty others on racketeering and extortion charges of a Long Island business. In March 2003, Daidone was indicted again for racketeering, loan-sharking, gambling and conspiracy to commit murder the 1989 Gilmore murder and the 1990 Facciolo murder among other crimes. Former Lucchese family acting boss Al D'Arco testified against Daidone during his trial. In 2004, Daidone's daughter Lori's fiancé John Micali a Gambino family associate pleaded guilty to bank burglary charges in Brooklyn federal court and agreed to serve up to six years behind bars. On June 30, 2004, Daidone was sentenced to life in prison, after being convicted of loansharking charges and the conspiracy to murder in Gilmore and Facciolo. As of May 2018, Daidone is incarcerated at the high-security United States Penitentiary (USP) in Allenwood, Pennsylvania.

=== Anthony Grado ===
Anthony "Tony Monroe" Grado a soldier in the family. On April 5, 2018, Grado and Colombo associate Lawrence Tranese pleaded guilty to charges of conspiracy to distribute oxycodone. Grado and Tranese threatened a Brooklyn doctor and forced them to write fraudulent prescriptions for over 230,000 pills. The duo provided said doctor with a list of names of "patients" that the doctor should write the prescriptions out to.

Grado and Tranese physically terrorized the doctor as well. In one recorded conversation, Grado told the doctor that he would make him "write a thousand scripts a day and f---ing feed you to the f---ing lions", if prescriptions were written without approval and that if the prescription records fell into anyone's hands but Grado's, he would "put a bullet right in [the doctor's] head." On one occasion, Grado also ordered one of his associates to stab the doctor, and the associate carried out the order. On December 6, 2018, Grado was sentenced to 12 years in prison. He is currently incarcerated at FCI Cumberland with a release date of December 19, 2027.

=== Christopher Londonio ===
Christopher Londonio is a soldier in the family. On February 13, 2017, Londonio and associate Terrance Caldwell were indicted on the murder of Michael Meldish, the former leader of the East Harlem Purple Gang. In the indictment Londonio and Caldwell were charged with murdering Meldish on November 15, 2013, near Baisley Ave and Ellsworth Ave in the Bronx. On May 31, 2017, Londonio was indicted again along with Matthew Madonna, Steven Crea and Joseph DiNapoli and other members and associates of the family on charges of racketeering, murder and other crimes. In October 2019, it was reported that Londonio planned to escape the Metropolitan Detention Center in Brooklyn in 2017 by breaking through a window using dental floss and then using bed sheets to climb down to the street. Londonio began working out to lose weight and arranged with a bookmaker from Arthur Ave to provide him with $150,000 to use to get to Monticello. Londonio planned after escaping prison to go to the Bronx and kill Matthew Madonna's wife and his partner in a loansharking. The plan was uncovered by prison guards after Londonio's co-conspirator and cellmate told the prison guards of the plan. On November 15, 2019, Londonio along with Matthew Madonna, Steven Crea and Terrence Caldwell were convicted in White Plains federal court of executing the murder of Michael Meldish. On July 27, 2020, Londonio was sentenced to life in prison for the Meldish murder, along with Madonna and Caldwell.

=== Joseph Massaro ===
Joseph "Joey Bang Bang" Massaro is a soldier. He was a member of the "Harlem Crew" and reported to capo Anthony Baratta. During the early 1980s, Massaro extorted Long Island topless bars starting a feud with the Bonanno crime family. In 1990, Massaro and Patrick Esposito murdered Joseph Fiorito. In 1993, Massaro was found guilty of extortion and arson to take over Long Island topless bars. At his trial FBI agent Joe Pistone discussed what he learned about a 1980 Bonanno-Lucchese family sit-down over the topless bars in Long Island. Former Lucchese family acting boss Alphonse D'Arco also testified against him. Massaro is currently serving life in USP Lewisburg Prison. (Register Number: 83413-020)

== Associates ==
=== Peter Argentina ===
Peter Argentina is an associate and younger brother to mobster Raymond "Ray" Argentina. In 1992, he was acquitted of participating in an armored car heist. On June 21, 2011, Carl Lastorino, the son of Frank Lastorino, shot Argentina in the hand and shoulder. While escaping Carl Lastorino was shot to death by the police.

=== Vincent Bruno ===
Vincent Bruno (1984) is an associate of the Bronx faction. In 2011, Bruno began working with Genovese soldier Salvatore Larca in a marijuana distribution network in Westchester County. On February 14, 2013, Bruno was arrested, and Salvatore Larca put Joseph Basciano (the son of former Bonanno family boss Vincent Basciano) in charge of running the marijuana distribution route while continuing to pay Bruno a portion of the profits. On January 28, 2014, Bruno was sentenced to 108 months in prison for marijuana and cocaine conspiracy.

On May 31, 2017, Bruno along with Street Boss Matthew Madonna, Underboss Steven Crea Sr., Consigliere Joseph DiNapoli, Capo Steven Crea Jr., and others, they were indicted and charged with racketeering, murder and other crimes. The indictment charged Bruno and Lucchese soldier Paul Cassano with the 2012 attempted murder of a Bonanno family associate. In 2012, a group of Bonanno family associates forced their way into a Lucchese family Bronx social club and one of the Bonanno associates offended Underboss Steven L. Crea. After the intrusion Steven Crea ordered his son capo Steven D. Crea Jr. to have the Bonanno associate killed and Crea Jr. passed the order to Bruno and Paul Cassano. The next night Bruno and Cassano went to kill the Bonanno associate in his Bronx residence but they failed. The murder was never carried out and the dispute between both was settled. In September 2018 Bruno pled guilt to one count of attempted murder in aid of racketeering. He was sentenced to 136 months in prison on attempted murder in aid of racketeering and racketeering conspiracy. On March 21, 2022, Bruno was released from prison.

=== Joseph Cosentino ===
Joseph "Joey Blue Eyes" Cosentino (surname alternatively spelled Consentino) is an associate to Bronx faction. During the 1950s, Cosentino and his friend John "Johnnie Boy" Petrucelli lived in Cosentino's mother house in the Bronx. Cosentino and Petrucelli became hitmen for the Lucchese family operating from Pelham Parkway in the Bronx.

In the early 1980s, Cosentino worked closely with Carmine Avellino running gambling operations in Queens and Long Island. The FBI recorded multiple conversation during April 1983, between Salvatore Avellino Jr., who was the driver for boss Anthony Corallo, underboss Salvatore Santoro, Carmine Avellino, Joseph Cosentino and Richard DeLuca, who was the driver for Santoro. During the reordered conversation the FBI would hear the men discussing gambling operations controlled by Carmine Avellino and Consentino.

On September 13, 1989, Cosentino and Anthony Magana murdered John "Johnnie Boy" Petrucelli on his front lawn in White Plains, New York, for harboring Gus Farace. On May 31, 1991, Cosentino and Anthony Magana each received a twenty-five-year sentence for the murder of Petrucelli. In 1996, Cosentino and Anthony Magana appealed the May 31, 1991, sentenced and the petition was denied on May 10, 1996.

During the 1990s, Cosentino's two sons Joseph "JoJo" and Adam worked for a Lucchese bookmaker. His two sons became involved in a war with deceased John Petrucelli two sons John Jr. and Joseph who were members of the Lucchese family's farm team the Tanglewood Boys. The sons of Cosentino tried making peace at a bar in Pelham Parkway with John Petrucelli Jr. but were assaulted by Freddie Santorelli and Darin Mazzarelli.

=== Ralph M. Perna Jr. ===
Ralph M. Perna Jr. (born March 8, 1972) is an associate and son of Ralph V. Perna. His brothers Joseph and John are members of the New Jersey faction. On December 18, 2007, Perna along with his father Ralph V., his brothers Joseph and John, and other members and associates of the New Jersey faction were arrested on gambling, money laundering and racketeering charges. On May 14, 2010, Perna was indicted along with thirty three other members and associates of the New Jersey faction on the 2007 charges of gambling, money laundering and racketeering. In January 2016, his father Ralph V. received an eight-year state prison sentence for pleading guilty to running a multibillion-dollar gambling enterprise, and his brothers Joseph and John each received 10-year sentences, while he had charges still pending against him.

== Imprisoned associates ==
=== Joseph Cutaia ===
Joseph "Spanky" Cutaia is an associate. His father Salvatore is a soldier, and his grandfather Domenico was a capo in the Lucchese family. On December 24, 2009, Cutaia and Nicholas Bernardo were charged with attempted robbery and stick up of a Bensonhurst, Brooklyn couple. In February 2010, Cutaia was indicted along with his grandfather capo Domenico Cutaia, his father soldier Salvatore Cutaia, soldier Carlo Profeta, associates Eric Maione and Nicholas Bernardo, Bonanno family capo Anthony Mannone and associate Jerome Carameilli on racketeering and extortion charges. He is released in December 2023 from prison. In December 2024, Cutaia was indicted and charged with six counts of extortion plus six violations of supervised release, for extorting two Brooklyn businesses for more than $100,000 in payoffs during 2023 and 2024. He is currently being held in the MDC Brooklyn detention center.
