= East Harlem Purple Gang =

Italian-American gang

Purple Gang
- Founded: c. Early 1970s
- Founding location: New York City, New York, United States
- Years active: c. 1970s–1980s
- Territory: Harlem (especially East Harlem, Italian Harlem, and Pleasant Avenue) and the South Bronx
- Ethnicity: Italian American
- Membership (est.): 30 members and 80 associates
- Activities: Drug trafficking, murder, contract killing, gun-running, extortion, robbery, bookmaking, kidnapping, racketeering, loansharking
- Allies: Five Families (especially the 116th Street Crew of the Genovese crime family); The Council; The Corporation; and various Latin American drug trafficking organizations and African American organized crime groups
- Rivals: Various gangs in New York City, including their allies, especially the Bonanno crime family

The East Harlem Purple Gang was a gang and organized crime group in New York City consisting of Italian-American hit-men and heroin dealers who were semi-independent from the Italian-American Mafia and, according to federal prosecutors, dominated heroin distribution in East Harlem, Italian Harlem, and the Bronx during the 1970s and early 1980s. Though mostly independent of the Mafia and not an official Mafia crew, the gang was originally affiliated with and worked with the Lucchese crime family and later with the Bonanno crime family and Genovese crime family. It developed its "closest ties" with the Genovese family, and its remnants or former members became part of the Genovese family's 116th Street Crew.

== Origins ==
They allegedly named their group the "Purple Gang" as a tribute to a Prohibition Era gang (Purple Gang) that dominated organized crime activities in Detroit for a time fifty years earlier. Membership in the group was restricted to Italian-Americans who grew up on Pleasant Avenue between 114th and 120th Streets, just east of 1st Avenue, also known as Italian Harlem. In the late 1970s, at the peak of its strength, the Purple Gang had about 30 members according to police reports and 80 associates, with higher numbers placing the gang's membership at over 100 (though this may include associates). By 1977, law enforcement claimed that the Purple Gang had committed at least 17 homicides, some on behalf of "organized crime principals", though dozens of other murders in the 1970s and 1980s have since been attributed to Purple Gang members. During their prime, they were considered the unofficial sixth family.

== History ==
The Purple Gang originated in Italian Harlem as an Italian-American youth street gang and were involved in various robberies and assaults before engaging in more organized criminal activity. Many of its founding members were related, some as brothers or cousins. When they first drifted into the narcotics business, the gang originally acted only as "delivery boys" or "spotters" (i.e. lookouts) for local established Italian mafiosi involved with the drug trade. However, the Purple Gang eventually rose to power in the Harlem drug trafficking business and subsequently graduated to committing murders following the 1973 arrests and convictions of several powerful Italian-American Mafia figures who had until then been dominating heroin and narcotics distribution in East Harlem. The 1973 arrests largely involved high-ranking mafiosi involved in the so-called "French Connection" heroin smuggling ring, such as Louis Inglese and Lucchese boss Carmine Tramunti. In the wake of these arrests, the Purple Gang filled the power vacuum created within the drug trade in East Harlem, eventually dominating the heroin trade in Harlem and the South Bronx and becoming not only major independent drug distributors but also major drug distributors for New York's "Five Families." In addition to drug trafficking and murder, the Purple Gang's other activities included kidnapping rival drug dealers for ransom, collecting loansharking debts, extortion, and labor racketeering, sometimes carrying out these activities independently and sometimes acting on behalf of one of the Five Families.

Throughout the 1970s, Italian-American and African-American organized crime groups both controlled narcotics trafficking in Harlem and much of New York City, and the two ethnic crime groups often cooperated or worked closely together in the drug trade business. The Italian-American Purple Gang was especially closely connected with African-American organized crime groups in Harlem. The Purple Gang eventually began supplying heroin to infamous Harlem drug kingpin Leroy Barnes and his organized crime network. After the arrest of Leroy Barnes, who was at the time one of the top heroin dealers in Harlem, the Purple Gang began supplying heroin to his remaining network of African-American dealers in Harlem at $75,000 per kilogram.

The Purple Gang became increasingly involved with murder, sometimes acting independently and sometimes as contract killers for the Mafia, and they became renowned for their "enormous capacity for violence." By 1977, law enforcement claimed that the Purple Gang had committed at least 17 homicides, with many of these murders committed on behalf of "organized crime principals" (i.e., Italian-American Mafia families.) Many of the murders attributed to the Purple Gang were exceedingly grisly, with some involving decapitation, dismemberment, or multiple stab wounds. The gang is also suspected to be involved in a rash of killings during the 1970s of various mobsters and people with organized crime connections, with the murders notably involving .22 caliber firearms. Dismemberment and .22 caliber killings subsequently became known in the underworld as the trademark of the Purple Gang.

According to police reports, at the peak of its strength in 1977 the Purple Gang consisted of approximately 30 members and over 80 associates, with higher numbers placing the gang's membership as over 100 (though this may include associates). Most of the gang's members were younger men in their 20s or 30s, many of whom were considered by the Mafia to be too reckless or "uncontrollable" for membership in the Mafia.

Although an independent gang that operated largely outside the constraints and structure of the established "Five Families" of the New York Italian-American Mafia, the Purple Gang was closely tied to the Italian-American Mafia and would often freelance as "muscle" or hit-men for the larger New York families. Many Purple Gang members were in fact relatives of established Italian-American Mafia members. However, it remains unclear what activities the gang performed independently and what activities the gang carried out for certain Mafia families. For instance, several members were notably arrested in Monroe, New York in Upstate New York for assaulting private sanitation workers, suggesting the gang may have been involved in labor corruption or extortion within the sanitation business, either independently or as enforcers for the New York Mafia. Though the gang often worked for the Five Families and frequently acted as drug distributors for the Five Families, they were also noted for their "lack of respect for other members of organized crime," and they just as often competed with the Mafia or disregarded the Mafia's turf claims and orders, sometimes moving in on Mafia drug territory. In fact, law enforcement at one point feared that a mob war would break out between the Purple Gang and certain Mafia families, specifically Carmine Galante's Bonanno Crime Family, and the gang became so powerful and feared that it was sometimes referred to as New York City's "Sixth Family."

Law enforcement speculated that during the late 1970s, the Purple Gang developed a relationship with Nicaraguan drug dealers, trading firearms for drugs. The firearms were apparently sent to Latin American narcoterrorists through connections in Florida in exchange for smuggled drugs. The Purple Gang was also suspected of having ties to the Cuban mafia in Florida.

The Purple Gang disintegrated during the late 1970s and early 1980s and was absorbed into the current 116th Street Crew. Some members were invited to join the Mafia and became made men, including Angelo Prisco and Daniel Leo who became the acting boss of the Genovese crime family in 2005. Bonanno alleged boss Michael Mancuso was also an associate of the Purple Gang. On November 13, 2013, Michael Meldish, a reported leader of the gang, was killed in Throggs Neck, ordered by Lucchese acting boss Matthew Madonna, and carried out by Christopher Londonio and Terrence Caldwell; the three were sentenced to life in prison for the murder on July 27, 2020.

== Pleasant Avenue ==
Pleasant Avenue, a six-block stretch in East Harlem, is one of the incubators of the Italian Mafia in New York City. Anthony 'Fat Tony' Salerno ran the Genovese crime family from Pleasant Avenue.

Anthony Loria, Sr., a longtime partner of Vincent Papa who masterminded the "Who Stole The French Connection" corruption scandal, was born and raised on Pleasant Avenue. This scheme involved corrupt NYPD and law officials who allowed the drug lords to steal an estimated 70 million dollars of narcotics from the NYPD property room at 400 Broome Street in the late 1960s and early 1970s.

The Purple Gang's longtime association with Pleasant Avenue is shown in the 1993 film Carlito's Way. In the film, the titular character (Al Pacino) refers to the gang as "The Pleasant Avenue bunch" when its members come to kill him.

== See also ==
- 10th & Oregon Crew Philadelphia
- Forty-Two Gang Chicago
- New Springville Boys Staten Island
- South Brooklyn Boys Brooklyn
- Tanglewood Boys Westchester

General:

- Crime in New York City
- Italians in New York City
