= Matthew Madonna =

American mobster (born 1935)

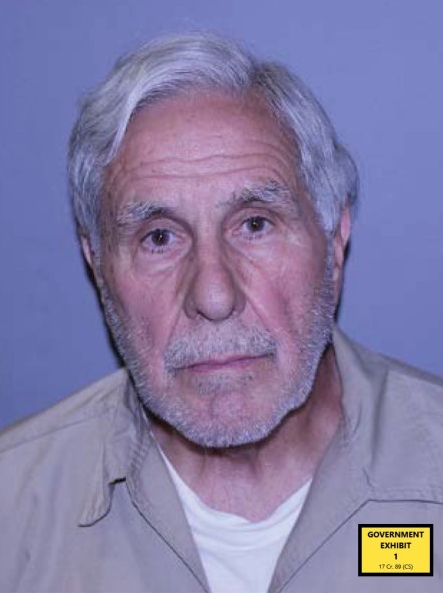
- DOJ mugshot of Madonna in 2017
- Born: November 2, 1935 (age 91); New York City, U.S.
- Occupation: Mobster
- Allegiance: Lucchese crime family
- Convictions: Drug trafficking (1976); Racketeering (2015); Murder (2019)
- Penalty: 30 years' imprisonment Five years' imprisonment Life imprisonment (2020)

Matthew Madonna (November 2, 1935) is an American mobster who is a member of the Lucchese crime family. He previously served as acting boss before being imprisoned in 2017.

== Narcotics trafficking ==
In 1959, while serving a sentence at the Green Haven Correctional Facility in Upstate New York, Madonna became acquainted with Nicky Barnes, a young drug dealer from Harlem. After their release from prison, Madonna started supplying large quantities of heroin to Barnes. Madonna would drop off a car with a trunk full of heroin at a Manhattan parking lot. Barnes would pick up the heroin later and exchange it for cash. A few days later, Madonna would return to pick up the car with the cash. Madonna and Barnes continued this arrangement until 1975, when Madonna was arrested for drug trafficking. On December 21, 1976, Madonna was sentenced to 30 years in federal prison.

In December 1981, while still in prison, Madonna received a summons to testify before a grand jury about narcotics activity in the New York area. In two appearances before the grand jury, Madonna refused to testify, even after being granted immunity from self-incrimination. The judge finally held Madonna in contempt of court. Madonna received an extra 528 days added to his sentence.

== Release and promotion ==
In 1995, after serving 20 years in prison, Madonna was released from Lewisburg Federal Penitentiary. Around 1998, Madonna was inducted into the Lucchese crime family as a reward for his silence and to assist his return to earning money for the family. Shortly thereafter, Madonna became a capo. Madonna was sent to prison again, but released on September 22, 2003.

After the convictions of family leaders Steven Crea, Louis Daidone, Dominic Truscello and the cooperation of former acting boss Joseph DeFede, the Luccheses established a three-man ruling panel to govern the family. Madonna, along with Aniello Migliore and Joseph DiNapoli headed the panel.

== Acting boss ==
On December 18, 2007, New Jersey law enforcement arrested Madonna and 32 other members and associates of the Lucchese family. In a year-long investigation titled "Operation Heat", law enforcement agencies uncovered a $2.2 billion illegal gambling, money laundering and racketeering ring. The scheme involved collecting bets from gamblers on basketball, football, greyhound races and the lottery. The mob collected bets over the Internet and by phone from a location in Costa Rica, with help from Joseph Mancino, a senior member of the Gambino crime family. Along with Madonna ruling panel member Joseph DiNapoli, top New Jersey Faction capos Ralph V. Perna and Nicodemo Scarfo, Jr. were indicted in May 2010. Madonna was released on bail pending trial.

In 2008, The Village Voice reported that Madonna was an employee of Big Geyser, Inc., New York's largest distributor of health beverages. It was speculated that this was a no-show job for Madonna.

After the ruling panel was disbanded in 2009, Matthew Madonna took over as acting boss and Joseph DiNapoli became the new consigliere. In late 2009, the parole restrictions expired on longtime underboss Steven Crea and he was able rejoin the family's leadership again.

On October 1, 2009, Madonna was indicted along with Joseph DiNapoli and 27 others in a large racketeering scheme. The indictment stated that Madonna was a key player in a vast operation that grossed approximately $400 million from illegal gambling, loansharking, gun trafficking and extortion. A second part of the indictment charged that Madonna and other Lucchese mobsters ran a bribery scheme among New York City building inspectors. On June 28, 2010, Madonna and the other defendants pleaded not guilty to all charges. Madonna was granted bail while the trial was delayed. In 2013, Madonna along with John Castellucci performed a secret initiation ceremony for John Pennisi in a basement of a Staten Island home.

On June 17, 2015, Madonna agreed to plead guilty to the 2007 racketeering indictment, and was sentenced to five years in prison on September 30.

Before his release date, Madonna and 18 others were charged on May 31, 2017, with a wide range of racketeering activities, including ordering the November 15, 2013, murder of East Harlem Purple Gang leader Michael Meldish.

During the May 2019, testimony of government witness John Pennisi, it was revealed that in 2017, imprisoned-for-life boss Vic Amuso sent a letter to underboss Steven Crea which stated that Michael DeSantis would take over as acting boss replacing Bronx-based Madonna. Madonna and Crea both stepped down and agreed to Amuso's orders.

On November 15, 2019, Madonna, Crea, Christopher Londonio and Terrence Caldwell were convicted in White Plains federal court of executing the murder of Michael Meldish. On July 27, 2020, Madonna was sentenced to life in prison for the Meldish murder, along with Londonio and Caldwell. Madonna is incarcerated at the United States Penitentiary, McCreary, Kentucky.
