= Sixth Family =

Type of crime family

A Sixth Family is a crime family or criminal organization, usually an Italian-American or Italian-Canadian crime group, that has become powerful or notable enough to rise to a level comparable to that of the Five Families of the New York City Italian-American Mafia. A criminal organization deemed a "Sixth Family" may rival the Five Families or, alternatively, may work closely enough with the Five Families that it appears to be a peer or near coequal of the families.

== Criminal organizations deemed "Sixth Family" ==
Various criminal organizations have been deemed the "Sixth Family", often by the press or the criminal underworld. One organization to receive the designation is the Rizzuto crime family based in Montreal, Quebec, Canada, though the Rizzuto family does not refer to itself as the "Sixth Family". The Rizzuto family has allegedly worked closely with the Bonanno crime family out of all five New York Five Families. The DeCavalcante crime family, which is based in North Jersey, across the Hudson River from the Five Families, and famously served as the inspiration for the hit TV show The Sopranos, are at times also referred to as the “Sixth Family.”

Other criminal organizations referred to as the "Sixth Family" include:

- East Harlem Purple Gang, a gang of Italian-American hitmen and heroin dealers who dominated heroin distribution in East Harlem and the Bronx during the late 1970s and early 1980s in New York City. The East Harlem Purple Gang was semi-independent of but closely connected to (and at times feuded with) the Italian-American Mafia.
- The Gallo crew, officially part of the Colombo crime family and led by mobster Joe Gallo. The crew eventually waged war against their own crime family and considered themselves as an independent structure.
- Rudaj Organization, an Albanian mafia family in New York City.
