= Bull's Head =

Bull's Head or Bulls Head may refer to:

- Bull's Head (artwork), a found object artwork by Pablo Picasso
- Bull's Head Inn, a disambiguation page for pubs of that name
- Bull's Head Tavern, a former establishment in Manhattan, New York City
- Bulls Head, Staten Island, a neighborhood in New York City
- Bulls Head Ground, a cricket ground in Coventry, England
