= Chris Paciello =

American gangster; restaurateur

Chris Paciello (born Christian Ludwigsen, September 7, 1971) is an American former Cosa Nostra associate, member of The Untouchables car-theft ring, and government informant who was convicted of racketeering. During the 1990s, and again in 2012, he became a prominent nightclub owner in the South Beach section of Miami Beach, Florida.

== Biography ==
=== Background ===
Paciello was born Christian Ludwigsen in 1971 in Borough Park, Brooklyn, the first of three sons born to Marguerite (née Paciello) and George Ludwigsen, and spent his childhood there. His father was a heroin addict and a small-time criminal who was arrested for burglary, auto theft, and drug charges in the 1980s. By age 15, Paciello found himself stealing car radios and then cars.

When he was 16, his mother left the family and Paciello moved to Staten Island. Three years later, he left home and changed his last name from Ludwigsen to Paciello, his mother's maiden name. His elder brother, George Ludwigsen, was convicted of bank robberies in Hallandale, Florida and Gulfport, Mississippi in the 1990s.

=== New York crimes ===
Paciello had connections to the New York Cosa Nostra crime families. On Staten Island, Paciello joined the New Springville Boys (LUSS), a gang with affiliations to the Bonanno crime family. In December 1992, he participated in a $300,000 bank robbery at a Chemical Bank in the Staten Island Mall.

On December 1, 1999, Paciello was charged with murder. He had planned a home invasion on Staten Island and served as a driver. Paciello had information that the target, Sami "Bix" Shemtov, who owned several adult entertainment stores, kept large amounts of cash at his house. An accomplice, Thomas Reynolds, who in 2004 was sentenced to 42 years in prison, shot Sami's wife, Judith, in the head, killing her, when she answered her door. In February 1994, Paciello and his gang robbed a Westminster Bank in Bensonhurst, Brooklyn, stealing $300,000.

=== South Beach ===
Impressed by the new techno-style nightclubs in New York, Paciello decided to open his own club in Miami Beach, Florida. Using money from the Westminster Bank robbery, Paciello opened the nightclub, Risk, in the South Beach section in November 1994. Unknown to his fellow gang members, Paciello had also started providing information about them and their Cosa Nostra contacts to the Federal Bureau of Investigation (FBI).

In late November 1995, Paciello opened a new nightclub, Club Liquid, in South Beach, bringing in local celebrity Ingrid Casares as a partner. Liquid soon became a center of Miami's South Beach nightlife in the 1990s. The singer Madonna, a friend of Casares, was a frequent guest.

In 1996, William Cutolo, a powerful leader of the Colombo crime family in New York, told Paciello that he needed to start paying tribute to him. However, the New York Gambino crime family was one of Paciello's early financial backers. In a Brooklyn meeting with acting Colombo boss Alphonse Persico and Gambino representatives, Paciello was allowed to choose affiliation with the Colombos. Neither family was aware that Paciello was still working for the FBI.

=== Prison ===
On December 1, 1999, Paciello was charged in New York in the 1993 murder of Judith Shemtov and robbery. In an effort to hold Paciello behind bars until his trial, Assistant U.S. Attorney Jim Walden introduced evidence to demonstrate that Paciello had threatened witnesses, sold narcotics, and had direct links to Mafia boss Alphonse Persico and the Bonanno and Gambino crime families. This request was denied on December 16, 1999, and Paciello was freed on a $3 million bond but forced to remain in jail until a hearing in New York the following week.

In October 2000, Paciello pleaded guilty to a single racketeering charge and was sentenced to ten years in prison, after he admitted driving the getaway car after the attempted burglary of the Shemtov home. Paciello later fingered two made members of the Bonanno family, which ultimately led to the takedown of almost the entire upper echelon of the organization, including family boss Joseph "Big Joe" Massino. Paciello's cooperation with the federal government was "unprecedented," according to a March 2004 letter by his then-lawyer, Benjamin Brafman, to the court that would sentence Paciello in connection with the murder and robbery charges related to Judith Shemtov. Brafman estimated that "more than 70 people" had been "prosecuted directly and indirectly as a result of [Paciello's] cooperation," which was reportedly confirmed in a letter from the U.S. District Attorney's Office in Brooklyn.

In September 2006, he was released after serving six years in prison and placed on parole.

=== After release ===
He moved to Los Angeles, where he owned two Cristoni pizzerias, both now closed. He was arrested over a street fight with Joey Rio and Dean Heiser in 2008, but no charges were filed.

On March 6, 2012, Paciello opened a new restaurant, Bianca, in the Delano Hotel in South Beach. He made the following press statement:

I regret the mistakes I made in the past. I am working hard to make a positive impact and to build a new life for myself in Miami. I am grateful to the many people here who have welcomed me back with open arms, and look forward to a positive future.

Paciello is a co-owner of the new nightclub "Rockwell" in South Beach with his partner from Montenegro. In February 2021, Paciello purchased a Miami Beach mansion from the late celebrity hair stylist Oribe.

== Popular culture ==
=== In film ===
- The 2000 remake of the 1974 film Gone in 60 Seconds was inspired by The Untouchables car theft ring.
- The 2007 film Kings of South Beach is based on Paciello's story, with Jason Gedrick playing him.

=== In books ===
- In Clubland: The Fabulous Rise and Murderous Fall of Club Culture, Paciello's role in the Shemtov murder and his prosecution by Walden.

=== In television ===
- In episode 1.9 of the Investigation Discovery television series, I Married a Mobster: Love Hurts (airdate 7 September 2011), Love Majewski (now a cast member of Mob Wives) described her relationships with Paciello and Ray Merolle, Jr.
- His case is featured on the show Deadly Sins (2012) (Season 1, Episode 6, titled "Mother of All Sins").
- He is profiled in a documentary series from Court TV (now TruTV) MUGSHOTS: Chris Paciello – The Mob Over Miami, episode (2013) at FilmRise.
- His story is featured in Season 4, Episode 9 of the Investigation Discovery television series, Vanity Fair Confidential: "The Disco Inferno" (air date April 2, 2018).
