= Metropolitan detention center =

Federal prison operated by the Federal Bureau of Prisons and located throughout the US

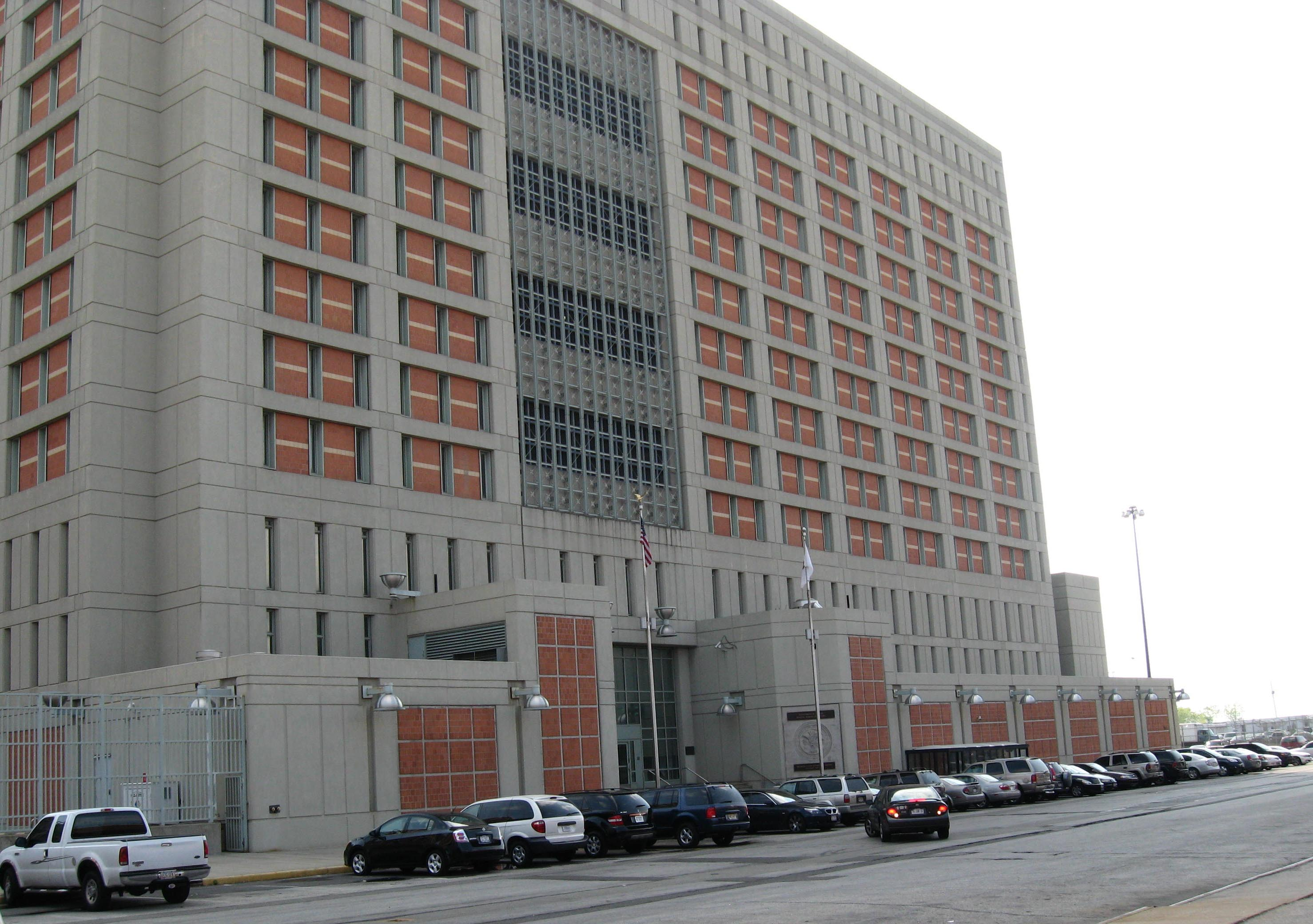
Brooklyn MDC

A metropolitan detention center (MDC) is a type of detention facility (jail) operated by the Federal Bureau of Prisons of the United States federal government. There are MDCs throughout the United States.

An MDC, unlike a Federal Penitentiary, is designed to hold prisoners who have not yet been arraigned, have been denied bail, or are awaiting trial. MDCs also hold inmates on their way to their designated 'home' prison.

Convicted prisoners are transferred to one of a series of Federal Prisons, also run by the Bureau of Prisons.

== Definition ==
An MDC is considered to be an administrative facility, as defined by the Bureau of Prisons:

Administrative facilities are institutions with special missions, such as the detention of pretrial offenders; the treatment of inmates with serious or chronic medical problems; or the containment of extremely dangerous, violent, or escape-prone inmates. Administrative facilities include Metropolitan Correctional Centers (MCCs), Metropolitan Detention Centers (MDCs), Federal Detention Centers (FDCs), and Federal Medical Centers (FMCs), as well as the Federal Transfer Center (FTC), the Medical Center for Federal Prisoners (MCFP), and the Administrative-Maximum (ADX) U.S. Penitentiary. Administrative facilities are capable of holding inmates in all security categories.

== Reported abuse ==
A 2003 report by the Justice Department Office of the Inspector General on the experience of 762 post-9/11 detainees found confirmed the physical and verbal abuse of detainees. On arrival at the Metropolitan Detention Center, Brooklyn, New York, the detainees were slammed face first into a wall against a shirt with an American flag; the bloodstain left behind was described by one officer as the print of bloody noses and a mouth. Once inside they were threatened with detention for the rest of their lives, verbally abused, exposed to cold, deprived of sleep, and had their hands, cuffed arms, and fingers severely twisted.
