= Bull's Head Inn =

Bull's Head Inn may refer to:

== Australia ==
- Royal Bull's Head Inn, a former hotel in Drayton, Queensland, Australia

== United Kingdom ==
- Bull's Head Inn, Poole, a listed former inn in Dorset, England
- Bull's Head Inn, an old coaching house in Belper Lane End, Derbyshire, England
- Bull's Head, Stockport, a listed former pub in Greater Manchester, England
- Bull's Head, Strand-on-the-Green, a listed pub in Chiswick, London
- The Bull's Head, Barnes, a pub in Richmond-upon-Thames, London
- The Bull's Head Hotel, one of the early grounds of Manchester City F.C. in Manchester, England

== United States ==
- Bull's Head Inn, oldest building in the Cobleskill Historic District, Schoharie County, New York, USA
