= Lucchese crime family Brooklyn faction =

Faction of the Lucchese crime family

Lucchese Family Brooklyn Faction
- Founded: 1930s
- Founder: Lucchese crime family
- Founding location: Canarsie, Brooklyn, New York, U.S.
- Years active: 1930s–present
- Territory: Brooklyn, Queens, Long Island and Staten Island
- Ethnicity: Italians as "made men" and other ethnicities as associates
- Activities: Racketeering, bookmaking, loansharking, extortion, gambling, burglary, cargo theft, conspiracy, counterfeit consumer goods, murder, smuggling, fencing, union corruption, hotel robbery, hijacking and jewelry heists
- Allies: Gambino, Genovese, Bonanno and Colombo crime families
- Rivals: Various gangs

The Brooklyn faction of the Lucchese crime family is a group of Italian American mobsters who control organized crime activities in the New York metropolitan area but are predominantly based in Brooklyn and Staten Island. The administration of the Lucchese family have identified crews and members based in Brooklyn as the being part of the Brooklyn faction. Since the leaders of the Lucchese family were originally from the Harlem and Bronx faction of the family.

The Lucchese family has had members operating in Brooklyn dating back into the 1930s. The earliest known Brooklyn based caporegime was Salvatore "Don Turiddo" Curiale who led his crew operating in Brownsville, Canarsie and East New York. After Curiale retired his crew was taken over by Caporegime Paul Vario. The Vario Crew, sometimes known as the Canarsie Crew, had predominantly been based in Brooklyn neighborhoods of Canarsie and Flatlands. The crew was controlled by Caporegime Paul Vario during the early 1960s into the early 1980s, when Vario, Jimmy Burke, and a number of other associates were imprisoned, primarily due to the testimony of another long-term associate, Henry Hill. The life story of Hill's time with the Vario crew was the subject of Nicholas Pileggi's book Wiseguy and Martin Scorsese's crime film adapted from that book, Goodfellas (1990), starring Ray Liotta as Hill. After Vario's imprisonment, Alphonse "Little Al" D'Arco became the new caporegime of the crew. During the early 1990s, D'Arco worked closely with family boss Vic Amuso and Underboss Anthony Casso, following their orders having numerous murders committed. In 1991, D'Arco became the family's acting boss when Amuso and Casso went into hiding, but D'Arco eventually feared for his life and became a government witness. The crew was then taken over by Domenico "Danny" Cutaia, who was able to bring back some stability.

Another powerful crew was the 19th Hole Crew, sometimes called Bensonhurst Crew, was based in Bensonhurst, Brooklyn. In the past, the crew was controlled by Christopher "Christie Tick" Furnari and then by his protege Vic Amuso. In 1986, Vic Amuso became the new boss of the family and promoted his close ally Anthony "Gaspipe" Casso to Caporegime of the crew. Under Casso's leadership the Bensonhurst crew would be responsible for 100 murders making it the most violent and bloodiest reigns in Lucchese family history. In 1993, Casso was imprisoned, and he became one of the highest-ranking members of the Mafia to turn informant. After Casso's defection much of the crew's leadership was imprisoned and leaving the crew without members.

The Lucchese family administration saw the 19th Hole crew had been crippled by numerous indictments and informants during 1990s, leaving many members imprisoned. In the early 2000's, the Lucchese family administration decided that Vario Crew Caporegime Domenico "Danny" Cutaia would also take control of the Bensonhurst Crew. After the merger of the two crews, the Lucchese Borgata referred to this crew as the Brooklyn faction.

Cutaia would continue to control both crews, known as the "Brooklyn faction" until he stepped down for health concerns in late the 2000s. The family administration promoted John "Big John" Castellucci to Caporegime of the Brooklyn faction crew. Castellucci was arrested in 2017 and demoted with the new family administration once again divided the faction into multiple crews each led by a different caporegime.

== History of the Vario Crew ==
=== Don Turrido Curiale ===
The earliest known leader of the Lucchese family's Brooklyn crew was Salvatore "Don Turrido" Curiale, an immigrant from Agrigento, Sicily. Curiale was an original Brooklyn mobster before the Commission was created and would later join the Lucchese crime family. In the 1960s, Curiale stepped down as Caporegime, and proposed his closest ally Joseph Schiavo to be made the new caporegime of the crew, but Schiavo declined and suggested his protege Paul Vario be promoted instead. Schiavo continued controlling garment businesses with Curiale and Tommy Lucchese, while serving as an elder advisor to Paul Vario.

=== Paul Vario's power ===
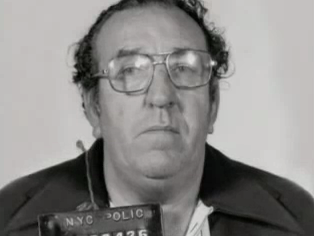
Paul Vario mug shot

In 1962, Paul Vario was released from prison and became a made man in the Lucchese family, and then he quickly was promoted to the caporegime of the Brooklyn crew. Vario operated from an old German bar known as Geffken's on Flatlands Avenue and a Junkyard on Avenue D in Canarsie, Brooklyn. He became a powerful mobster receiving millions of dollars from the members of his crew and local criminals. Vario's junkyard in Canarsie is where he oversaw most of the crew's criminal operations including hijackings, loansharking, bookmaking and fencing stolen property. His crew was heavily involved in hijacking cargo shipments, extorting shippers and airlines in exchange for labor peace from John F. Kennedy Airport in Queens, NY. Vario also controlled several loansharking and bookmaking operations in Brooklyn, Queens and Long Island.

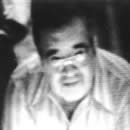
Frank Manzo in an FBI surveillance photograph

One of Vario's associates was James "Jimmy" Burke, an Irish gangster who ran his own crew of hijackers that would pay off truck drivers and then unload the goods at a warehouse Vario controlled. Burke led his semi-independent Robert's Lounge Crew, from his bar Robert's Lounge. The Robert's Lounge crew was composed of numerous people who were involved in armed robbery, hijacking, and murder. Although Burke's crew was independent, many members were associates of the Lucchese family through Burke's and Vario's longtime friendship. Burke's crew included wiseguys Thomas DeSimone and Henry Hill.

Vario also maintained a close alliance with Lucchese caporegime John Dioguardi, who controlled labor unions in New York City. In the 1970s, when Vario and Burke were imprisoned, the majority of Vario's bookmaking operations were taken over by his Russian Jewish associate, Martin Krugman.

In the late 1970s, two of Vario's associates Henry Hill and Jimmy Burke, began dealing in amphetamines, cocaine, heroin, and marijuana. Hill ran his drug organization with his wife Karen, William Arico, Anthony and Rocco Perla, Robin Cooperman, and Judith Wicks. In early 1979, Burke and Hill began selling heroin. After Robert "Bobby" Germaine Jr., the son of Henry Hill's drug partner, became an informant, Hill was monitored. In 1980, Hill was arrested for drug dealing and, facing the likelihood of receiving several life sentences, he accepted the option to become an informant. Hill's testimony led to 50 convictions. In 1980, on Burke's orders, Angelo Sepe shot and killed Bobby Germaine, Jr. in Kew Gardens, Queens.

Burke was given 20 years for fixing sporting events and a life sentence when the authorities convicted him for murdering scam artist Richard Eaton. Vario was given a 12½-year sentence during the KENRAC trial.

=== D'Arco with Amuso and Casso ===
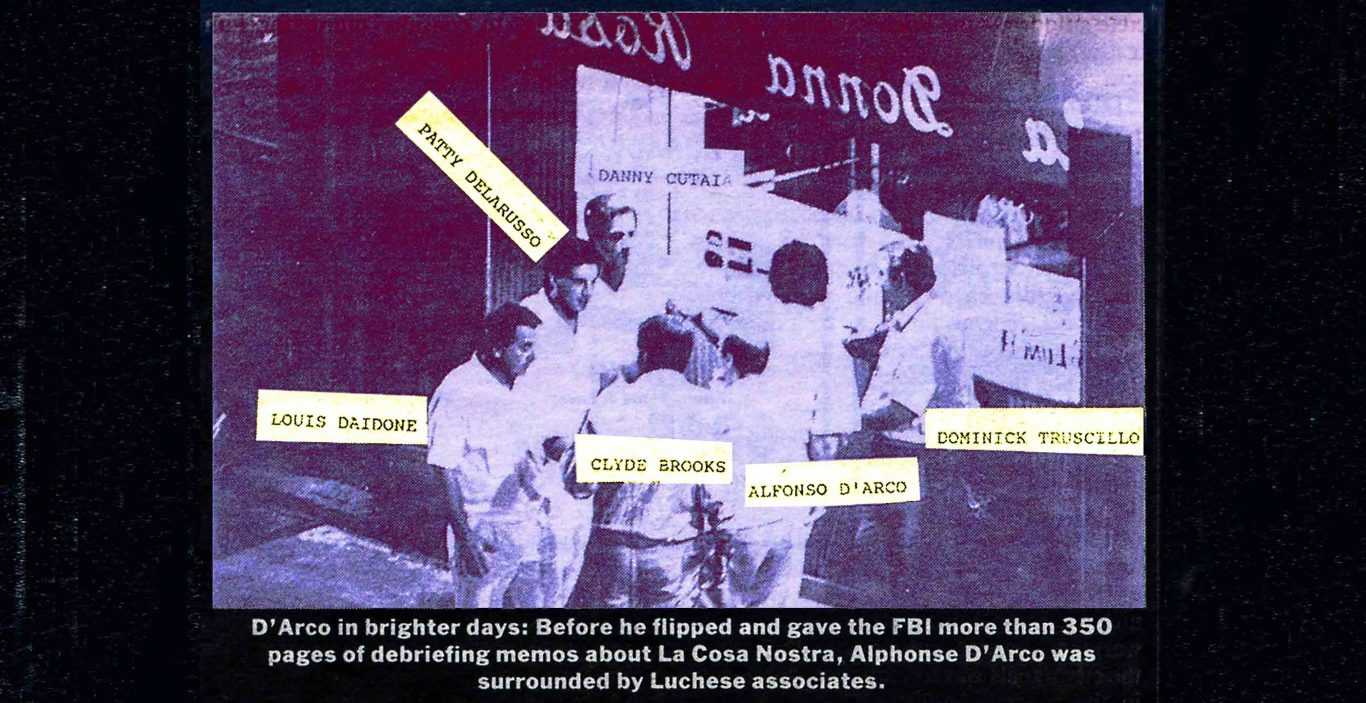
FBI surveillance photo of Danny Cutaia, Patrick "Patty" Dellorusso, Louis Daidone, Dominick Truscello, Alphonse D'Arco and Clyde Brooks

After Vario's imprisonment, Alphonse "Little Al" D'Arco was promoted and became the new caporegime of the crew. D'Arco worked closely with family boss Vic Amuso and Underboss Anthony Casso. He followed their orders having numerous murders committed and D'Arco eventually feared for his life and became a government witness, later testifying against Amuso and Casso.

== Historical leadership ==
=== Caporegimes of the Vario/Cutaia crew (merged) ===
- c. 1930s–1962: Salvatore "Don Turiddo" Curiale — stepped down, retired
- 1962–1988: Paul Vario — sentenced in 1984 to 12 1/2 years in prison; died on May 3, 1988
  - Acting 1967–1970: Salvatore "Babe" Vario — youngest brother to Paul Vario
  - Acting 1974–1976: Peter "Pete the killer" Abinanti
  - Acting 1976–1980: Vito "Tuddy" Vario — brother to Paul Vario
  - Acting 1980–1984: Frank "Frankie" Manzo
  - Acting 1984–1988: Peter "Rugsy" Vario — son of Paul Vario
- 1988–1991: Alphonse "Little Al" D'Arco — served as Street Boss from May 1990 to January 1991; then served as Acting Boss from January 1991 to July 1991, when he was demoted; he became a government witness on September 21, 1991
  - Acting 1990–1991: Louis Daidone — promoted to Caporegime
- 1991–1992: Louis "Louie Bagels" Daidone — imprisoned on May 1, 1992
- 1992–2010: Domenico "Danny" Cutaia — also led the Jersey crew from 1993–2003; imprisoned '96-'00 and again '02–'05. Indicted in 2008, and again in 2009, and stepped down as caporegime do to health issues and imprisonment.
  - Acting 1996–1997: John Baudanza — demoted
  - Acting 1997–2002: John "Johnny Sideburns" Cerrella — arrested in 2002
  - Merged 2000: the McDonald Ave/Bensonhurst crew merged into Cutaia's crew, creating the Brooklyn faction, Domenico Cutaia continued serving as Caporegime

=== Caporegimes of the 19th Hole/Bensonhurst crew (split/merged) ===
- c. 1970s–1980: Christopher "Christie Tick" Furnari — promoted Consigliere; indicted on February 15, 1985, convicted on November 19, 1986, in the Mafia Commission Trial and sentenced on January 13, 1987, to 100 years in prison.
- 1980–1987: Vittorio "Vic" Amuso — promoted to boss
  - Acting 1987: Chris "Jumbo" Furnari Jr. — son of Chris Furnari, served as acting capo for a while.
- 1987: Anthony "Gaspipe" Casso — promoted to Consigliere
- 1987–1994: Robert "Bobby" Amuso — became ill and stepped down, he kept his capo position but with no crew; died September 5, 1994
  - Split 1987: Crew splits forming the new McDonald Ave Crew in Gravesend Brooklyn under the new capo Peter Chiodo
  - Split 1989: Crew splits forming the new Utica Avenue Crew in East Flatbush/Canarsie Brooklyn under the new capo Frank Lastorino
  - Acting 1989–1991: George "Georgie Neck" Zappola — promoted to capo
- 1991–1993: George "Georgie Neck" Zappola — became a fugitive in 1991, and demoted; captured and imprisoned in 1995
  - Acting 1991–1993: George "Georgie Goggles" Conte — imprisoned in 1995
  - Acting 1994–1996: Frank "Frankie Bones" Papagni — promoted to acting Consigliere
- Merged 1996: the crew was merged into McDonald Ave/Tangorra's Bensonhurst crew

=== Caporegimes of the McDonald Ave crew (merged) ===
- 1987–1991: Peter "Fat Pete" Chiodo — on May 8, 1991, shot 12 times, becomes a government witness testifying against Vic Amuso and Anthony Casso
- 1991: McDonald Ave crew members reported to Utica Avenue crew capo Frank Lastorino
- Merged 1991: Both the Utica Avenue crew and McDonald Ave crew merged together under capo Richard Pagliarulo
- 1991–1997: Richard "Richie the Toupe" Pagliarulo — imprisoned in 1992, receiving a life sentence
  - Acting 1992–1997: Nicholas "Nicky Edkins" DiCostanzo
  - Merged 1996: the 19th Hole/Bensonhurst crew merged into the McDonald Ave crew
- 1997–2000: Joseph "Joey Flowers" Tangorra — arrested in November 2000
  - Acting 1998: Eugene "Boopsie" Castelle — promoted to acting underboss
- Merged 2000: the crew was merged into the Vario/Cutaia crew, creating the Brooklyn faction under capo Domenico Cutaia

=== Caporegimes of the Utica Avenue crew (merged) ===
- 1989–1991: Frank "Big Frank" Lastorino — promoted to acting Consigliere; imprisoned in April 1993; shelved
  - Merged 1991: the crew breaks down with members joining the McDonald Ave crew under capo Richard Pagliarulo

=== Caporegimes of the Brooklyn faction (split/disbanded) ===
In early 2000, the Vario-Cutaia crew caporegime Domenico Cutaia was given the members of McDonald Ave/Bensonhurst crew creating the Brooklyn faction.

- c. 2000s–2010: Domenico "Danny" Cutaia — imprisoned, released from prison on October 5, 2013, died August 14, 2018
  - Acting 2000–2002: John "Johnny Sideburns" Cerrella — arrested in 2002
  - Acting 2003–2008: Michael "Mikey Bones" Corcione — arrested in 2008
  - Acting 2010: Carlo Profeta — arrested in 2010
- 2010–2017: John "Big John" Castellucci — arrested, and demoted
  - Split 2017: Crew splits forming the new Brooklyn/Long Island crew under new capo Patrick Dellorusso
  - Disbanded 2019: After Castellucci was imprisoned, the remaining members of the crew joined the new Brooklyn/Staten Island crew under new capo Frank Papagni.

=== Caporegimes of the Brooklyn/Long Island Crew ===
- 2017–2021: Patrick "Patty" Dellorusso — served as acting underboss 2017–2020
- 2021–2024: Crew reported to caporegime/administration ruling panel member George Zappola, who also controlled his Brooklyn-Staten Island Crew
  - Acting 2021–2024: Ray Argentina — promoted to capo
- 2025–present: Ray Argentina

=== Caporegimes of the Brooklyn/Staten Island Crew ===
- 2017–2021: Frank "Frankie Bones" Papagni — promoted to Underboss
- 2021–2025: George "Georgie Neck" Zappola — arrested in 2025
  - Acting 2021–2025: Mario Gallo — promoted to capo
- 2025–present: Mario Gallo

== Current members ==
Members of the Brooklyn/Long Island Crew

- Ray Argentina (Capo) — formerly with the Vario-Cutaia crew
- John Baudanza (Soldier) — formerly with the Vario-Cutaia crew
- Salvatore Cutaia (Soldier) — formerly with the Vario-Cutaia crew
- Michael "Mikey Bones" Corcione (Soldier) — formerly with the Vario-Cutaia crew
- Carlo Profeta (Soldier) — formerly with the Vario-Cutaia crew
- Peter Vario (Soldier) — son of Paul Vario, former capo of crew, former Vario-Cutaia crew member
- John "Johnny Sideburns" Cerella (Soldier) — formerly with the Vario-Cutaia crew
- Louis "Louie Jet" Gampero (Soldier) — was an associate to Ray Argentina and the Vario-Cutaia crew; inducted sometime in the late 2010s, into the Brooklyn/Long Island crew of Patty Dellorusso.
- Danny Campo (Soldier) — former associate of Patrick "Patty Red" Dello Russo, the underboss who sponsored his induction in late 2010s
- John "Butch" Arpino (Soldier) — former associate of Louie Daidone, became an associate of Patty Red Dello Russo who sponsored him for induction in 2010s

Members of the Brooklyn/Staten Island crew

- John "Big John" Castellucci (Soldier) — former capo of Brooklyn faction before demotion
- Joseph DiBenedetto (Soldier) — son-in-law to boss Vic Amuso, before merger was with 19th Hole-Bensonhurst crew
- Scotty Gervasi (Soldier) — before merger was with 19th Hole-Bensonhurst crew
- Vincent "Vinny" Zappola (Soldier) — the uncle to George Zappola, before merger was with 19th Hole-Bensonhurst crew
- George "Georgie Goggles" Conte (Soldier) — before merger was with 19th Hole-Bensonhurst crew
- James "Jimmy Frogs" Galione (Soldier) — before merger was with 19th Hole-Bensonhurst crew
- Frank Giacobbe (Soldier) — before merger was with 19th Hole-Bensonhurst crew

Imprisoned members of the Brooklyn faction

- Louis "Lou Bagels" Daidone — former Capo of the Vario crew, currently serving life in prison
- Nicky Scarfo Jr. — former Capo of New Jersey faction before joining the Brooklyn faction under capo John Castellucci, currently in prison

== Current associates ==
Associates of the Brooklyn faction

- Joseph Cutaia — associate in Vario-Cutaia crew
- Victor Sperber — associate in Vario-Cutaia crew
- Louis Colello — associate in Vario-Cutaia crew
- John Rodopolous — associate in Vario-Cutaia crew
- Peter "Petey Links" Bartolemeo — associate of John Pennisi and the Brooklyn faction
- John DiLorenzo — associate of John Pennisi; owner of "Rosemarie's Pizzeria & Restaurant" out of Farmingdale, Long Island; was the subject of several sit-downs due to other families claiming him as being on record with them
- Joe Fama — associate formerly on record with Little Joey DiBenedetto and owner of DiFama Concrete out of Staten Island, poached by Matty Madonna

== Past members and associates ==
These are past members and associates who have retired, transferred to another crew, been murdered, or died other ways.

Soldiers of Vario crew

- Frank Manzo (Soldier)
- Vito "Tuddy" Vario (Soldier)
- Peter "Rugsy" Vario (Soldier)
- Peter "Jocko" Vario (Soldier)
- Salvatore "Babe" Vario (Soldier)
- Thomas Vario (Soldier)
- Peter "Pete the Killer" Abinati (Soldier)
- Leonard Vario Jr. (Soldier)
- Joseph D'Arco (Soldier)
- Bruno Facciolo (Soldier, murdered in 1990)
- Rosario Sacco (Soldier)
- Luigi Sacco (Soldier)
- Alfonso "Foo" Curiale (Soldier)
- Paolo Danna (Soldier)
- Ray Argentina (Soldier)
- Joseph Chiavo (Soldier)
- Carmine "Fats" Taglialatela (Soldier)
- Anthony "Tony Blue Eyes" Stabile (Soldier, murdered in 1982)
- Emmanuel "Manny from Miami" LoGiudice (Soldier, died in 1978)
- Daniel “Danny” Rizzo (Soldier) — before merger was with 19th Hole-Bensonhurst crew, died 2015
- Anthony Guzzo (Soldier) — half-brother of Vito Guzzo Jr., a made member in the Colombo family, inducted under capo John Castellucci, later transferred to Joseph "Joe Cafe" DeSena Crew
- Joseph M. "Little Joe" Perna (Soldier) — former member of the New Jersey faction, before joining the Brooklyn faction under capo John Castellucci. Transferred back to the New Jersey faction becoming acting capo.

Associates of the Vario crew

- Clyde Brooks (associate, died in 1994)
- Angelo 'Sonny Bamboo' McConnach (associate, died in 1996)
- Joseph Abinati (associate)
- Thomas "Tommy Red" Gilmore (associate, Murdered on February 6, 1989)
- Frank James Burke (associate, murdered on May 18, 1987)
- Jimmy Burke (associate, died on April 13, 1996)
- Louis Cafora (associate disappeared in March 1979)
- Thomas DeSimone (associate, murdered on January 14, 1979)
- Richard Eaton (associate, murdered on July 18, 1979)
- Henry Hill (associate, became a witness in 1980, died on June 12, 2012)
- Martin Krugman (associate, disappeared on January 6, 1979)
- Angelo Sepe (associate, murdered on July 18, 1984)
- Louis Werner (associate, convicted on May 16, 1979)

== Former headquarters and hangouts ==
The crew operates throughout the New York City; The latest headquarters maintained under capo "Big John" Castellucci was the Cigar Vault Emporium in Staten Island. Some of its former headquarters and hangouts are:

- La Donna Rosa Restaurant in Little Italy, Manhattan
- Bargain Auto Junkyard
- Euclid Taxi Cab Company in Brownsville, Brooklyn
- Geffkens Bar – a bar owned by Paul Vario
- Kew Motor Inn
- Robert's Lounge – the former headquarters of Jimmy Burke's crew, located on Lefferts Boulevard and Rockaway Boulevard in South Ozone Park, Queens
- The Bamboo Lounge – former hangout, located on Rockaway Parkway and Avenue N in Canarsie, Brooklyn
- Lefferts Bar –
- The Suite – a former hangout owned by Henry Hill, located on Queens Boulevard near Forest Hills, Queens

== Government informants and witnesses ==
- Richard Bilello – associate, murdered on October 28, 1974
- Alphonse "Little Al" D'Arco – became a witness on September 21, 1991, died in 2019
- Theresa Ferrara – became a government informant, disappeared on February 10, 1979
- Peter Gruenwald – associate, became a witness in 1978, died in 1979
- Henry Hill – associate, became a witness in 1980, died on June 12, 2012
- John Pennisi – became a cooperating witness in 2018, after being falsely accused of being an Informant
- Steven Lapella – associate, indicted along with Dom Cutaia in 2008, and soon became a cooperating witness

== In popular culture ==
- Goodfellas (1990), directed by Martin Scorsese, is based on the Vario Crew and the life story of crew associate Henry Hill (portrayed by Ray Liotta)
