= Tanglewood Boys =

Italian-American gang

- Founded: c. 1990s
- Founding location: Yonkers, New York, U.S.
- Years active: c. 1990s–2000s
- Territory: Westchester County, the Bronx, and the Upper West Side
- Ethnicity: Italian-American
- Activities: Racketeering, bookmaking, drug trafficking, armed robbery, arson, assault, and murder
- Allies: Lucchese crime family
- Rivals: Various gangs in Westchester County and New York City, including the Albanian Boys

The Tanglewood Boys was an Italian-American recruitment gang or "farm team" for the American Mafia, specifically the Lucchese crime family. The gang frequently operated from the Tanglewood Shopping Center in Yonkers, New York.

== History ==
=== Crimes committed ===
In the 1990s, the gang began to rise in the public eye as a "farm team" led by Anthony Santorelli for the Lucchese crime family. Many members of the gang were sons of "made men", who grew up in the suburbs north of New York City. The gang was involved in murders, assaults, armed robbery, arsons, and bookmaking operations in Westchester County, the Bronx and the Upper West Side of Manhattan.

On March 6, 1992, two members, Darin Mazzarella and Joseph Petrucelli got into a racial argument and shot 16-year-old Kasiem Merchant to death in New Rochelle. Joseph Petrucelli received a life sentence for the murder. Joseph's brother John stabbed a random African-American to death in the Bronx to "avenge" his brother's imprisonment, after separately killing an Albanian gangster who insulted him.

On February 4, 1994, the Tanglewood Boys murdered Louis Balancio, a 21-year-old Mercy College student, outside the Strike Zone Bar after he was mistaken for a rival Albanian gangster. The same day, an FBI agent observed Anthony Santorelli dumping something into a garbage can, which turned out to be clothes covered in blood. A DNA check was conducted on the clothes and the blood belonged to Louis Balancio. Anthony DiSimone, the son of Lucchese family capo Salvatore DiSimone, went into hiding after the murder of Balancio.

In 1994, Joseph Lubrano was wrongfully sent to prison for beating a black police officer and was released four years later. During the trial, it was alleged that Lubrano was a member of the Tanglewood Boys.

In May 1995, Alfred "Freddy Boy" Santorelli and Darin Mazzarelli had a sit-down with brothers Joseph and Adam Cosentino over bookmaking operations in the Bronx. The sit-down took place in a Pelham Parkway bar that was owned by Bonanno crime family soldier Vincent Basciano. After drinking, Santorelli and Mazzarelli began hitting the brothers with bottles and shot at them as they escaped.

In June 1995, Darin Mazzarelli and John Petrucelli got into an argument with Gene Gallo in Loreto Park. Gallo left and got his friend Michael "Mike" Zanfardino, a hitman who worked for Genovese crime family capo Barney Bellomo's crew in Pelham Bay. Zanfardino pulled out a gun and shot Mazzarelli and pointed the gun at Santorelli before leaving the scene. Petrucelli and others came back that night and stabbed Paul Cicero, Gallo's cousin, to death.

In December 1996, Darin Mazzarella was charged with the 1994 murder of Louis Balancio, and Anthony Santorelli was charged with throwing the bloody clothes into the dumpster.

=== Downfall ===
After his imprisonment, Darin Mazzarella agreed to become a government witness in 1997. He provided information that is credited with leading to significant disruption of the Tanglewood Boys and the Lucchese family. Mazzarella gave information for investigators and prosecutors on the Lubrano assault; he admitted participating in the assault with Alfred Santorelli, the son of Anthony Santorelli, and asserted that Lubrano was not a Tanglewood member.

In 1999, Anthony DiSimone turned himself in to the police and was sentenced in 2000 to 25 years to life for the murder of Louis Balancio. Anthony DiSimone served seven years in prison before the conviction was overturned, the defense never reviewed the evidence, he later pleaded guilty to manslaughter in 2010, and served no additional time.

In October 2002, Darin Mazzarella testified against John Petrucelli, in the murder trial of Paul Cicero. Petrucelli had murdered Cicero in retaliation for Mazzarella being shot early by Cicero's cousin Gene Gallo, a Genovese crime family associate. In February 2003, John Petrucelli was sentenced to life in prison for the 1995 murder of Paul Cicero.

In 2005, the leader of the gang Michael "Chunk" Londonio opened fire on police officers searching his apartment, wounding two, before he was shot and killed. Five others were arrested.

In 2016, it was revealed by government informant Anthony Zoccolillo that both Joseph Lubrano and Steven Crea Jr. started their criminal careers in the Tanglewood Boys.

== In popular culture ==
In 2005 and 2006 a fictionalized version of the Tanglewood Boys was featured on CSI: NY, in episode 1.13 "Tanglewood" and in episode 2.20 "Run Silent, Run Deep". In the series the gang is led by Sonny Sassone (Michael DeLuise) and one of the more notorious members of the gang is Louie Messer (Larry Romano), Danny Messer's (Carmine Giovinazzo) older brother.
