= 1987 in organized crime =

In 1987, a number of events took place in organized crime.

== Events ==
- January – Commission Case The bosses of the 5 New York families – The Commission – are sentenced. All 8 defendants return to court to hear Judge Richard Owen hand down the sentences. All 6 bosses, Genovese boss (front boss) Anthony "Fat Tony" Salerno-100 years, Lucchese boss Antonio "Tony Ducks" Corallo-100 years, Lucchese underboss Salvatore "Tom Mix" Santoro-100 years, Lucchese consigliere Christopher "Christie Tick" Furnari-100 years, Colombo boss Carmine Junior" Persico-100 years, Colombo acting boss/underboss Gennaro "Jerry Lang" Langella-100 years. The other 2 Colombo soldier Ralph Scopo-100 years, Bonanno soldier Anthony "Bruno" Indelicato-45 years
- January 15 – Nicodemo "Little Nicky" Scarfo, boss of the Philadelphia crime family, is arrested and charged with planning an extortion scheme with a city councilman. Scarfo is ordered by Federal Magistrate Edwin E. Naythons to be held without bail as public danger pending his eventual trial.
- January 16 – Bonanno crime family boss Philip "Rusty" Rastelli is convicted of labor racketeering over a 20-year period between 1964 until 1985 and sentenced to 12 years imprisonment.
- January 20 – Former Teamsters Union President Roy L. Williams' appeal before the U.S. Parole Commission on the grounds of ill health is denied, ordering the 71-year-old former labor union leader to serve his full prison term. Williams, who had been imprisoned for conspiring to bribe a U.S. Senator, will eventually be released from prison on May 31, 1992.
- February – Pasquale "Paddy Bulldog" Varriale, a minor gambler and con artist, is killed after receiving $10,000 from the Bonanno crime family, and later backing out of, an agreement to bribe a juror connected to the Pizza Connection case. His brother Carmine Varriale, a made man within the Lucchese crime family, would be murdered in September.
- March 2 – The defendants of the "Pizza Connection" are officially convicted of drug trafficking after being found guilty by a New York jury. Another 175 mobsters and their Sicilian counterparts are eventually indicted in the aftermath of the federal investigation. In Italy, only Vito Badalamenti, the son of Sicialian mafioso and former Cupola chairman and Capo di tutti capi Gaetano "Don Tano" Badalamenti, would be acquitted.
- March 10 – After four years as a government informant, Cleveland mobster Angelo "Big Ange" Lonardo's prison sentence is reduced to time served by U.S. District Court Judge John Mandos and is released on 5 years probation.
- March 12 – Ilario "Larry Baione" Zannino, consigliere of the Patriarca crime family, is sentenced to a consecutive 30 years imprisonment on illegal gambling and extortion charges. During the trial Zannino publicly threatened, and later apologized to the jurors.
- March 13 – Gambino crime family leader John "The Dapper Don" Gotti is acquitted, along with 5 other defendants, on Racketeer Influenced and Corrupt Organizations Act (RICO) and conspiracy charges by a U.S. New York petit jury.
- March 17 – Santo Trafficante Jr., boss of the Trafficante crime family, died at age 72.
- April 22 – As a result from a civil case between the federal government and Local 6A among other labor unions, the leaderships of the Colombo, Genovese and Lucchese crime families including Gennaro "Jerry Lang" Langella, Carmine "Junior" Persico, Dominic "Donnie Shacks" Montemarano, Ralph "Ralphie" Scopo, Anthony "Fat Tony" Salerno, Anthony "Tony Ducks" Corallo, Salvatore "Tom Mix" Santoro, and Christopher "Christy Tick" Furnari are ordered by U.S. District Court Judge Vincent L. Broderick, SDNY, are barred from interfering or participating in labor union activities or in relation to concrete industry.
- April 29 – William Ciccone, a mentally ill Ozone Park, Queens resident, fired a shot at Gambino crime family boss John Gotti outside the Bergin Hunt and Fish Club. Ciccone was apprehended, taken to a Staten Island candy store and tortured and murdered by associate Joe Watts. Former soldier Dominic "Fat Dom" Borghese testified that Watts pumped six bullets into Ciccone's head.
- May 19 – A U.S. District Court clerk, Mildred Carmella Russo, is indicted by a Federal grand jury and charged with supplying information to members of the Gambino crime family for more than a decade.
- May 21 – Los Angeles crime family boss Peter John Milano and his brother, underboss Carmen "Flipper" Milano are indicted under the Racketeer Influenced and Corrupt Organizations Act, along with 13 other members, by a Federal grand jury and charged with drug trafficking, extortion and other crimes.
- June 13 – Several high-ranking members of the Colombo crime family, including leader Carmine "Junior" Persico, underboss Gennaro "Jerry Lang" Langella, capos John "Jackie" DeRoss, Andrew "Andy Mush" Russo and members Dominic "Little Dom" Cataldo and Alphonse "Allie Boy" Persico are convicted of labor racketeering.
- August 4 – Philadelphia mobster Nicodemo "Little Nicky" Scarfo, along with 6 associates, pleaded not guilty to charges of conspiracy and murder in 1 of 3 gangland slayings, including the July 1985 murder of Frank "Flowers" D'Alfonso.
- October 13 – N.Y.C. District Council of Carpenters officials John O'Connor, Martin Forde, Attilio Bitondo, Eugene Hanley, and Irving Zeidman were indicted by the Manhattan District Attorney's office for extorting building contractors. The men had ties to Gambino crime family capo Ralph Mosca and Genovese crime family capo Vincent DiNapoli, and the indictments were the result of informant Gambino crime family associate Dominick LoFaro. All men would be convicted and sent to prison.
- October 21 – Sicilian mafioso and nephew of Gaetano Badalamenti, Pietro Alfano, whose Oregon, Illinois pizzeria was the center of Midwest drug trafficking operations for the Pizza Connection, was convicted for narcotics conspiracy and sentenced to 15 years imprisonment. Among those convicted include Salvatore Lamberti and Giuseppe Lamberti who each receive twenty years.
- December 16 – The Maxi Trial, a purge of hundreds of Sicilian mafiosi, comes to an end. Of the 474 defendants 360 were convicted and 114 acquitted. Michele "The Pope" Greco was convicted of 4 murders and received life imprisonment.
- December 16 – Defendant Antonino Ciulla is shot dead on his way home from the Maxi Trial.

== Arts and literature ==
- A Better Tomorrow II (film)
- Donnie Brasco: My Undercover Life in the Mafia (non-fiction book) by Joseph D. Pistone.
- The Untouchables (film) starring Kevin Costner, Sean Connery, Charles Martin Smith, Andy García and Robert De Niro.

== Deaths ==
- February – Pasquale Varriale "Paddy Bulldog", New York criminal and associate of the Bonanno crime family
- March 17 – Santo Trafficante, Jr., Tampa crime family boss.
- May 12 – Robert Trimbole, Australian businessman and drug baron
- September – Carmine Varriale, Lucchese crime family member and brother of Pasquale Varriale
- December 16 – Antoninio Ciulla, Sicilian mafioso
