= DiNapoli =

DiNapoli is a surname. Notable people with the surname include:

- Gennaro DiNapoli (born 1975), American football player
- Joseph DiNapoli (born 1935), American mobster
- Louis DiNapoli (born 1938), American mobster
- Thomas DiNapoli (born 1954), American politician
- Vincent DiNapoli (1937–2005), American mobster
