= Dominick LoFaro =

American gambler and later undercover informant

- Born: 1928
- Died: 2003 (aged 74–75)
- Other name: Big Dom
- Allegiance: Carpenters' Union (before 1984)
- Criminal charges: Narcotics trafficking (1984)

Dominick "Big Dom" LoFaro (1928–2003) was a small-time gambler who later became a government undercover informant.

== Biography ==
Lofaro worked in the New York area, and was arrested for drugs. He agreed to testify against John Gotti. He had claimed to be part of gang that which specialized in labor racketeering, loan sharking, and extortion. LoFaro was a "bagman" in the Carpenters' Union rackets. LoFaro also said he transported the Gambino family share from Greek-American mobsters operating in Astoria, Queens. In 1984, LoFaro was arrested in Upstate New York trying to sell a kilogram of heroin to an undercover agent in an FBI and Drug Enforcement Administration operation. Facing over 20 years in prison for narcotics trafficking, LoFaro decided to wear a surveillance wire for the government and record mob conversations.

According to Time magazine, investigators outfitted LoFaro "with a tiny microphone taped to his chest and a miniature cassette recorder, no bigger than two packs of gum, that fitted into the small of his back without producing a bulge. Equipped with a magnetic switch on a cigarette lighter to activate the recorder, Lofaro coolly discussed Gambino family affairs with the unsuspecting Gotti brothers. Afterward he placed the tapes inside folded copies of The New York Times business section and dropped them in a preselected trash bin."

LoFaro wore a wire for the FBI for two years. One of LoFaro's primary targets was Gambino boss John Gotti. LoFaro also gathered evidence against Gambino members Mosca, Mosca's sons, and Carmine Fiore. LoFaro also produced evidence against Genovese crime family associates Attilio Bitondo and Eugene Hanley, who were leaders in the New York City Carpenters' Union. LoFaro provided information to the New York State Organized Crime Task Force that led to electronic surveillance on the offices of Carpenters' Union Locals 608 and 257 in Manhattan.

LoFaro was placed in a witness protection program. He died in 2003.
