= Attilio Bitondo =

American mobster (1928–2024)

- Born: June 20, 1928
- Died: August 27, 2024 (aged 96)
- Other name: Tillio
- Occupation: Labor leader
- Status: Convicted
- Allegiance: Genovese crime family
- Criminal charges: Extortion, Enterprise Corruption, Racketeering, Bid rigging, Bribery
- Penalty: 1½ to 4½ years in prison, banned from union business
- Accomplices: Eugene Hanley, Anthony Fiorino, Ralph Coppola, Anthony Simon, Carmine Fiore

Attilio Bitondo (June 20, 1928 – August 27, 2024), also known as Tillio, was an American labor leader in New York City and an associate in the Genovese crime family in the crew of powerful Manhattan captain Vincent DiNapoli.

As Vice-President of Carpenters Union Local 257, Bitondo had jurisdiction over construction on the East Side of Manhattan. Bitondo and Local President Eugene Hanley systematically extorted New York City drywall contractors for the Genovese family. The two union leaders also engaged in bid rigging and bribery.

In the mid-1980s, Judge Stephen Crane authorized the New York State Organized Crime Task Force to wiretap the Local 257 Office telephones located at 157 East 25th Street in Manhattan.

The resulting intercepted telephone calls would be used as evidence against Bitondo, Hanley and other union and organized crime figures, and also demonstrated the grip the men had over the City's construction industry. In on telephone call, contractor Mario Marsillo indicated to Bitondo and Hanley that he was using non-union workers on an East Side job because he had "given a cup of coffee" to Local 608 official John O'Connor, however, the East Side was Bitondo's jurisdiction, and the Genovese crime family was not happy. Marsillo asked to "have a cup of coffee" — apparently a euphemism for a bribe — with Bitondo, but Bitondo refused, saying "This here we shoulda done two months ago had a cup of coffee." After Bitondo and Hanley discussed with Marsillo the picketing at his site because of his failure to sign the union agreement, Marsillo said "I tried to reach, reach out ", Hanley replied "You reached out to the wrong people Mario." Ultimately, Mario smartened up and paid the Local 257 bosses.

Bitondo died on August 27, 2024, at the age of 96.

== Mob corruption crackdown ==
On October 13, 1987, Bitondo, Hanley and three other Carpenters Union leaders, were indicted for extortion. They were accused of taking more than $100,000 from Manhattan contractors wanting to avert labor problems. One of the cooperating contractors testified that Bitondo approached him at a construction site with another man and threatened to throw him off the roof of the building if he didn't comply with his extortion demands. The affected projects included the World Financial Center at Battery Park City, Pier 17 at the South Street Seaport, the Equitable Life Assurance Building, and exhibits at the Whitney Museum of American Art. The Manhattan District Attorney Robert Morgenthau stated that the indictments documented only about 10 percent of the payoffs that 17 cooperating contractors said they made; corroborative evidence could not be obtained to support all the allegations.

The indictment came from information provided by Gambino crime family associate turned informant, Dominick LoFaro. LoFaro wore a wire during meetings with Bitondo at the Queens social club of Gambino captain Ralph Mosca. LoFaro also wore a wire while sitting in during extortion meetings attended by Bitondo and another Local 257 officer and Gambino soldier, Carmine Fiore. LoFaro testified that the Local 257 officers laundered, or disguised, illegal payments by making numerous deposits of $6,000 each at Manufacturers Hanover Trust Company branch. Also providing evidence was Genovese family turncoat Vincent "Fish" Cafaro, who knew Bitondo as a close underling of Vinny DiNapoli and a labor racket partner of Liborio "Barney" Bellomo, and explained that each month Bitondo would deliver an envelope to the Genovese higher-ups in East Harlem.

In 1990, Bitondo was convicted of Enterprise Corruption charges and sentenced to 1½ to 4½ years in prison. Despite being incarcerated, Bitondo's influence remained, because he appointed organized crime figures like Anthony Fiorino, Ralph Coppola, and Anthony Simon to important labor posts, ensuring that the Genovese crime family would continue to reap profits from extortion and labor racketeering.

Bitondo and Hanley were convicted of racketeering charges. They received a short prison term and were banned from union business.
