= Louis DiNapoli =

American mobster

Louis DiNapoli (born December 12, 1938) is a New York City mobster and soldier in the Genovese crime family. DiNapoli grew up in the East Harlem section of Manhattan and became a made member of the Genovese family in the early 1980s, joining the 116th Street Crew, which was headed by his older brother Vincent DiNapoli. The crew was heavily involved in labor racketeering in the N.Y.C. District Council of Carpenters, and used its influence to extort money from New York construction companies and contractors.

On March 21, 1986, Louis, Vincent, and other Genovese mobsters were indicted for labor racketeering. On May 5, 1988, Louis and Vincent were convicted of creating scheme to allocate contracts and obtain payoffs for constructing the concrete superstructures of 16 Manhattan buildings, including Jacob K. Javits Convention Center and Trump Plaza. Louis was sentenced to 14 years in prison. On June 28, 1991, a federal appeals court reversed the convictions, rebuking the trial judge for exercising undue pressure on the jurors. However, in 1992 the U.S. Supreme Court overturned the appeals court verdict and reinstated the convictions. The final outcome of this legal action is unknown.

In 1982, Vincent DiNapoli went to prison on racketeering charges for five years. Louis DiNapoli and soldier Louis Moscatiello handled the Carpenter Union rackets during Vincent's absence. On May 18, 1995, Louis DiNapoli and his other brother Joseph "Joey Dee" DiNapoli, a captain who currently serves on the Lucchese crime family's ruling panel, were arrested for labor racketeering. The DiNapolis were charged with defrauding a state program that awarded public contracts to companies headed by minorities (women, African Americans, Latinos, etc.). Louis and Joseph set up three companies with figurehead minority owners that won over a dozen contracts for work at city schools and hospitals.
