= Vincent DiNapoli =

American mobster

Vincent DiNapoli (June 21, 1937 – November 16, 2005) was a caporegime in the Genovese crime family, involved in labor racketeering. DiNapoli is best known for creating a cartel in the 1970s that controlled the price of drywall in New York City.

== Early years ==
Growing up in the East Harlem section of Manhattan during the 1950s, DiNapoli was originally associated with the Lucchese crime family. He later switched to the Genovese crime family and became an associate of soldier Vincent "Fish" Cafaro, front boss Anthony "Fat Tony" Salerno's top lieutenant. DiNapoli's older brother Joseph is a member of the Lucchese crime family, formerly serving as consigliere. His younger brother Louis allegedly is a soldier in DiNapoli's crew.

In the late 1970s, Cafaro sponsored DiNapoli for family membership in the family and he was placed in Saverio Santora's 116th Street crew. By the early 1980s, DiNapoli had become New York's most powerful labor racketeer, earning himself and the Genovese family bosses millions of dollars from extortion, shakedown, bid rigging, and controlling companies.

== Union boss ==
DiNapoli dominated the New York City District Council of Carpenters through his ally Teddy Maritas. In 1981, DiNapoli, his brother Louis, and Maritas, were indicted on labor racketeering and extortion charges in a Racketeer Influenced and Corrupt Organizations Act indictment. DiNapoli allegedly became worried that Maritas might cooperate with law enforcement. In 1982, Maritas disappeared before the trial was scheduled to start. After Cafaro became a government witness, he claimed that DiNapoli murdered Maritas. Later in 1982, DiNapoli pleaded guilty to lesser charges and was sent to prison for five years. While in prison, his union rackets were managed by his brother Louis and Louis Moscatiello. DiNapoli later became close to the next District Council President, Paschal McGuinness, and the two men continued to enforce a mob tax on all drywall construction in New York.

In 1978, DiNapoli established the Operative Plasterers and Cement Masons International Association Local 530 and designated Mosciatello as business manager. DiNapoli also controlled Carpenters Local 257 through his associates Attilio Bitondo and Eugene Hanley. DiNapoli used their positions to extort contractors operating on the East Side of Manhattan. DiNapoli would again be convicted and sentenced to prison; his interests in the District Council would be absorbed by a close associate, Liborio Bellomo.

In 1978, DiNapoli formed two drywall companies, Inner City Drywall and Cambridge Drywall. By 1979, DiNapoli and his protege Steven Crea started working with SEBCO (South East Bronx Community Organization), an organization created by Catholic priest Louis Gigante, who was the brother of Genovese family boss Vincent Gigante. SEBCO was an organization of low-income housing in the South East Bronx that was financed by the federal Department of Housing and Urban Development. DiNapoli's drywall companies were able to secure construction projects award by SEBCO. By 1980, DiNapoli had secured more than $16 million worth of SEBCO contracts and more than $60 million in municipal contracts with two drywall companies.

In 1981, DiNapoli pleaded guilty to labor-racketeering, while his codefendant Theodore Maritas head of the city's carpenters union had disappeared. Congressman Mario Biaggi, a Bronx Democrat urged the federal judge to suspend DiNapoli's five-year sentence. In 1982, DiNapoli was linked to another drywall company Three Star Drywall, which had received over $1 million in subcontracts from SEBCO. In 1983, DiNapoli was imprisoned and his protege Crea would visit him on numerous occasions.

DiNapoli did not hesitate to use fear to keep the rackets in check. DiNapoli was suspected of ordering the slaying of Danny Evangelista, a dissident union leader from Local 385; Evangelista was shot to death while sitting at his desk in the Local. DiNapoli also allegedly gave the order to firebomb the home of another Local 385 member, Shaun Toner, who criticized various union officials.

== Business Holdings ==
DiNapoli secretly owned interests in a dozen construction companies, real estate properties, and housing developments. DiNapoli and Tony Salerno were the key figures representing the Genovese family in the concrete industry. Along with close associate Edward "Biff" Halloran, the men grossed millions of dollars, enough for Forbes magazine to place both Salerno and DiNapoli on the list of the Top 10 Richest Mobsters in the nation. DiNapoli secretly owned Cambridge Drywall and Inner-City Drywall, which became one of the biggest developers in Harlem and the South Bronx, and received $32 million in city contracts in 1988 alone.

In the early 1980s, DiNapoli became enraged when he lost out on a contractor who made a deal with Gambino boss Paul Castellano; the contractor, Frederick DeMatteis became one of Long Island's biggest developers. A conversation between members of the Concrete Club indicated that Castellano prevailed and kept DeMatteis as his partner:

Tony Salerno: "Metro is Paul's, right?"

Neil Migliore: "Metro's Paul's." Christopher Furnari: "It's Paul." DiNapoli had no choice but to accept the ruling from his superiors.

DiNapoli, Salerno, and mob associate Nicholas Auletta also owned the old Glen Island Casino in New Rochelle, New York. DiNapoli owned "Il Boschetto", a Bronx restaurant. During his time in prison, actor Burt Young operated the restaurant. In 1992, investigators learned that DiNapoli and Lucchese capo Steven Crea co-owned a valuable housing development in Yonkers, New York.

== Prison ==
In March 1986, DiNapoli and other Genovese family members were indicted for labor racketeering, construction bid-rigging, extortion, illegal gambling, and murder conspiracies. The indictment alleged that DiNapoli and his associates had cost real estate developers millions of dollars due to mob control of the concrete companies and subsequent bid rigging. While awaiting trial, Cafaro struck a deal with federal prosecutors and became a government witness. In 1988, DiNapoli was convicted and sentenced to prison.

On June 28, 1991, an Appeals Court in New York reversed the convictions of DiNapoli and the other mobsters and ordered a new trial.

Di Napoli died on November 16, 2005, at the age of 68.
