= Eugene Hanley =

American gangster and labor leader

- Born: April 2, 1926
- Died: April 20, 2009 (aged 83)
- Allegiance: Gambino crime family
- Criminal charges: Racketeering
- Penalty: Bribery (4 years)

Eugene Hanley (April 2, 1926 – April 20, 2009) was an American labor leader in New York City, and an associate of the Genovese crime family. Hanley took over as President of Local 257 of the New York City District Council of Carpenters for his father-in-law, a Genovese mobster named Will Graziano. Hanley and Local Vice-President Attilio Bitondo extorted building contractors operating in Manhattan in conjunction with Local shop steward Carmine Fiore, a Gambino crime family soldier, and other organized crime figures linked to the Gambino, Genovese and Colombo crime families. The men ordered beatings for those contractors who refused to back in, but typically, violence wasn't needed.

== Biography ==
In 1987, Hanley, Bitondo and other high-ranking officials of the N.Y.C. District Council of Carpenters were indicted on 79 counts of labor racketeering, including extortion, bribery, and bid rigging. District Attorney (DA) Robert M. Morgenthau claimed that contractors that cooperated with the DA's investigation claimed they paid over $100,000 in extortion payments, but DA Morgenthau explained that the figure documented less than 10% of the money paid to the gangsters during the investigation. Gambino associate turned informant Dominick LoFaro wore a covert listening device to gather information on the unions and gangsters, and provided information to the New York State Organized Crime Task Force leading to the "bugging" of the offices of Local 608 at 1650 Broadway and of Local 257 at 157 East 25th Street.

LoFaro also discussed Hanley's ties to other organized crime figures, including Bartholomew "Bobby" Boriello, Albert "Kid Blast" Gallo, Anthony "Tony" Scotto and Anthony "Sonny" Ciccone. Hanley would receive a 4-year prison sentence to lesser charges of bribe giving, and would be banned from future union activities. Hanley earned an early release from prison and received a no-show work release job at Casale Jewelry on Court Street, Brooklyn. Hanley's son William resigned from his position as President of Carpenter's Union Local 157 (which was renamed after the massive racketeering indictment) in November 2007, and the Local was placed under trusteeship, citing connections to organized crime, including prevailing upon a contractor to hire a no-work man named Joseph Vecchiarello.
