= List of past Lucchese crime family mobsters =

== Past member(s) ==
=== Joseph Abate ===
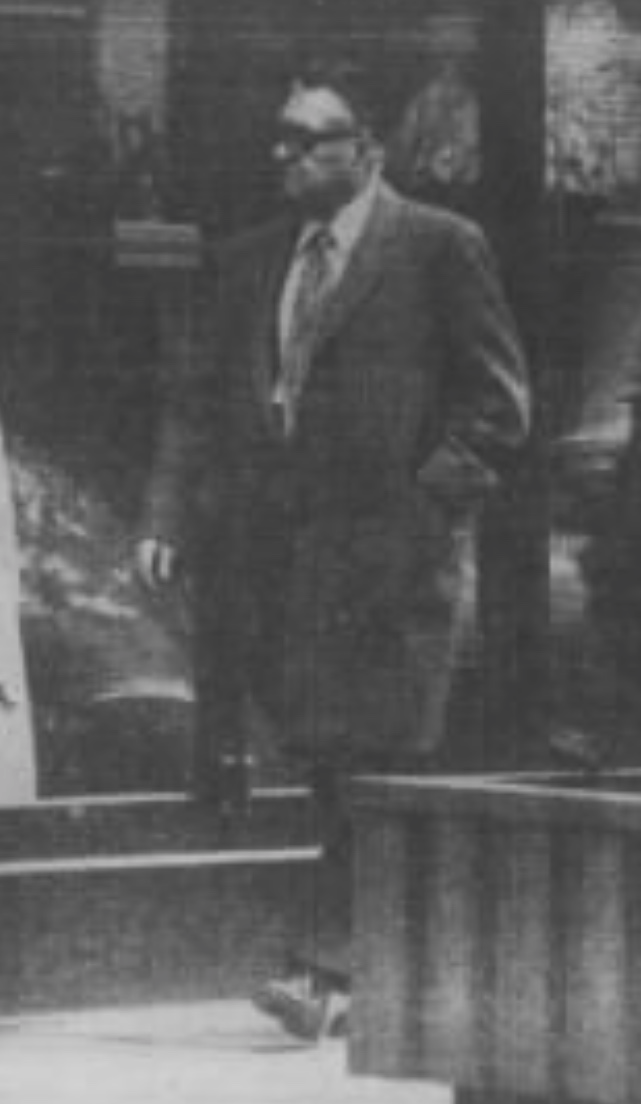
FBI surveillance photo of Abate

Joseph "Joe" Abate (July 8, 1902 – November 28, 1994) was a capo in the family's New Jersey faction. In the 1920s, Abate served as an enforcer for Al Capone in Chicago before settling in New Jersey. In June 1976, Abate attended Anthony Accetturo's induction ceremony into the Lucchese family. In 1979, Abate went into semiretirement and Accetturo succeed him as boss of the New Jersey faction. He moved to Margate, New Jersey, and served as a liaison between families in New Jersey until 1989 when he retired from Mafia affairs. In 1992, his daughter Catherine Abate was appointed New York City's new Correction Commissioner. She was confronted about her father's past and denied that he was ever involved in organized crime. In 1994, Joseph Abate died of natural causes. In 1998, his daughter Catherine admitted she could no longer dismiss allegations that her father belonged to the Lucchese crime family.

=== Settimo Accardi ===
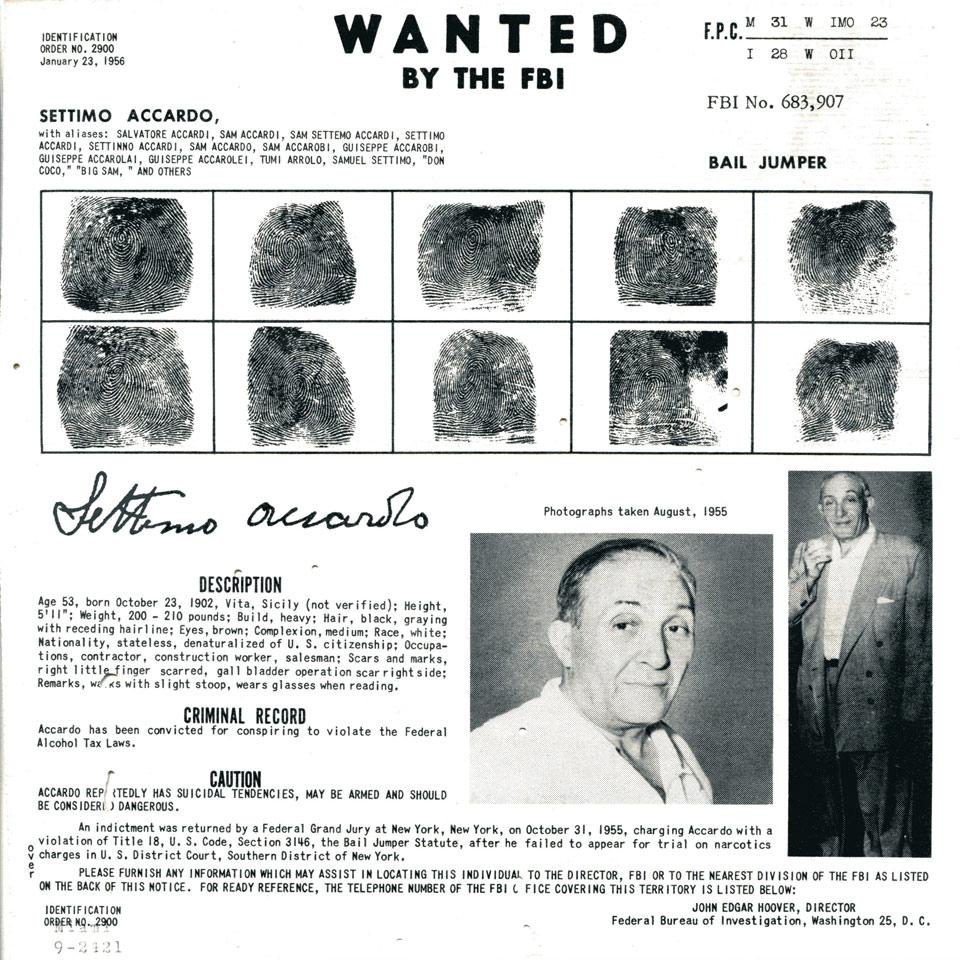
FBI Wanted Poster of Settimo Accardi issued on January 23, 1956

Settimo "Big Sam" Accardi (October 23, 1902, in Vita, Sicily – December 3, 1977) served as capo in the family's New Jersey faction up until his deportation and was one of the largest heroin traffickers during the 1950s. Accardi emigrated to the U.S. shortly before World War I and associated with mobsters Joseph Sica, Willie Moretti, Joe Adonis and Abner Zwillman. During World War II, Accardi sold counterfeit food ration cards. On January 22, 1945, he became a naturalized U.S. citizen. His naturalization was revoked on July 10, 1953, because he had not disclosed two previous arrests during his naturalization hearing.

In 1955, Accardi was arrested on a federal narcotics charge in Newark, New Jersey. After posting a $92,000 bond, Accardi skipped bail and fled to Turin, Italy, where he continued smuggling heroin into the U.S. and Canada. Accardi later moved to Toronto, Canada, to oversee this operation. In 1960, U.S. authorities finally located Accardi in Turin, Italy and on November 28, 1963, after a long legal fight, Accardi was extradited back to New York. On July 21, 1964, Accardi was convicted on narcotics conspiracy and skipping bail. On August 24, he was sentenced to fifteen years of imprisonment and a $16,000 fine. He died on December 3, 1977.

=== Joseph Brocchini ===
Joseph E. "Joe Bikini" Brocchini (1933 – May 20, 1976) was a soldier under Joseph "Joe Brown" Lucchese in the Corona crew. Born and raised in Corona, Queens, he was arrested as a 17-year-old along with four other youths for carrying out a series of burglaries that robbed eight businesses in north Queens of $26,000 during a week-long spree in 1950. Police believed that the burglary ring was responsible for approximately twenty robberies in Queens and Nassau County before being apprehended.

Brocchini, who was known as an enforcer, later became involved primarily in loansharking and gambling. By the early 1960s, he was managing a lucrative weekly dice game in Manhattan's Little Italy, and also had interests in auto theft and narcotics. Circa 1967, Brocchini ventured into the pornography business via a partnership with a Jewish associate. He became one of the most successful pornographers in New York City and allegedly owned or controlled at least four pornography distribution companies as well as five adult book shops/peep shows in Times Square. The State Investigation Commission charged in 1970 that his pornography businesses had grossed $1.5 million a year. During this time, Brocchini relocated to the affluent town of Harrison in Westchester County. On April 20, 1972, Brocchini was among twelve people linked to the Lucchese, Colombo and DeCavalcante families indicted on charges of wholesale promotion of obscene material. The arrests were made following a four-month undercover police investigation of New York's major pornography distributors.

In 1976, Brocchini was involved in a dispute with Roy DeMeo, a Gambino family associate at the time, with Brocchini giving DeMeo a black eye. DeMeo and his caporegime Nino Gaggi decided to kill Brocchini in revenge and, knowing that they would never be given permission by the Lucchese family, decided to disguise Brocchini's murder as a robbery-gone-wrong. Weeks later, on May 20, 1976, Brocchini was shot five times in the head in the office of his used car dealership in Woodside, Queens, where he conducted his day-to-day operations, by Roy DeMeo and Henry Borelli. DeMeo and several of his associates had first handcuffed and blindfolded two other employees at the car lot and ransacked the office, giving the killing the appearance of an armed theft-gone-awry. Brocchini was laid to rest at Mount Saint Mary Cemetery in Flushing, Queens.

His brother-in-law Alfred "Sonny" Scotti and others took over his operations. Brocchini's murder remained a mystery to law enforcement and to the Lucchese family for several years. At the time, police detectives believed that he was killed because of suspicions that he was skimming profits for himself without permission from his boss. Gambino associate Dominick Montiglio would later reveal the events surrounding Brocchini's murder after becoming a government witness in 1983.

=== Robert Caravaggio ===
Robert "Bucky the Boss" Caravaggio (1939 – July 28, 2017) was a soldier who led the New Jersey faction during the 1990s until the early 2000s. From 1986 to 1988, Caravaggio was one of the twenty defendants in the 21-month-long trial of Lucchese crime family's New Jersey faction. In August 1997, Caravaggio, along with other members of the Lucchese family's New Jersey faction, was indicted and charged with racketeering, loan-sharking and gambling. In 2004, the New Jersey Commission of Investigation stated that Caravaggio was the head of the Lucchese crime family's North Jersey faction. Caravaggio was overseeing operations in Northern Jersey, especially in Morris County. Caravaggio died on July 28, 2017, from pancreatic cancer.

=== Joseph Caridi ===
Joseph "Joe C." Caridi (November 20, 1948 – June 29, 2024) was a former acting underboss, and consigliere in the family. He resided in East Northport. He was nicknamed by the media the "Tony Soprano of Long Island" for running his crew from "Sinderella" a strip club in Brentwood similar to the "Bada Bing!" in the TV crime drama The Sopranos. In the early 2000s, he worked closely with former acting boss Louis Daidone and was picked up in wiretaps discussing loan sharking, extortion and drug dealing with Daidone and other Brooklyn faction mobsters.

On November 14, 2002, the Suffolk county police arrested Caridi who was listed as the underboss along with Aniello "Neil" Colello, Ronald Galiano, Milton Bialostok, John Cerrella, Vincent Mancione, Carmelo Profeta, Vincent Salanardi and other wiseguys, who were charged with enterprise corruption. The charges included loan-sharking, gambling, construction payoffs, restaurant extortion and other profit-skimming operation that stretched from Suffolk County to the Bronx. In December 2002, Caridi, along with capo John Cerrella and others, was indicted on extortion charges. Caridi's crew took control of the Hudson & McCoy Fish House restaurant in Freeport, Long Island, after the owner asked him for help. The owner's partner, Lewis Kasman, a Gambino crime family associate, had been stealing money from the restaurant. Caridi's crew successfully removed Lewis and started stealing up to $10,000 per night from the restaurant. He also forced the owner to buy his Italian bread from a Colombo crime family soldier. After the indictment soldier Vincent Salanardi began cooperating with the government while he continued to collect gambling debts. On March 23, 2003, Caridi pleaded guilty to extortion, to federal tax evasion and to running a sports betting operation from his home in East Northport. As part of this federal plea agreement, the State of New York dropped its November 2002 charges. On November 27, 2009, Caridi was released from prison. Caridi died on June 29, 2024.

=== Alfonso Cataldo ===
Alfonso T. "Tic" Cataldo (April 18, 1942 – August 21, 2013) was a soldier in the New Jersey faction. Cataldo grew up in Newark, New Jersey with his cousins Michael and Martin Taccetta. From 1986 to 1988, Cataldo was one of the twenty defendants in the 21-month-long trial of the Lucchese crime family's New Jersey faction. During the trial Cataldo was listed as a member supervising numbers and loansharking operations in New Jersey. In 2002, Cataldo was indicted on illegal gambling charges and for the October 7, 1981, murder of William Kennedy. In 2004, the New Jersey Commission of Investigation stated that Cataldo was running illegal gambling operations in New Jersey. In December 2007, Cataldo was indicted, along with capos Joseph DiNapoli, Matthew Madonna and Ralph V. Perna and others, on gambling, money laundering and racketeering charges. On August 21, 2013, Cataldo died of natural causes. Alfonso is a blood relative to Genovese capo Augustino "Crazy Augie" Cataldo and Genovese soldier Pete "Scarface" Cataldo.

=== Samuel Cavalieri ===
Samuel "Big Sam" Cavalieri (April 11, 1911 – November 4, 1987) was a former capo of the Harlem crew. In 1980, Cavalieri and Thomas Mancuso were under investigation for corruption of Local 29 of Blasters, Miners and Drill runners Union. The investigators suspected that Cavalieri illegal paid off Local 29 President Louis Sanzo and Local 29 secretary-treasurer Amadeo Petito. The investigation revealed that in 1978, Petito met in Cavalieri's social club in East Harlem. In 1981, Cavalieri was found guilty of criminal contempt and sentenced to 3 1/2 years in prison. On November 4, 1987, Cavalieri died of natural causes.

=== Ettore Coco ===
Ettore "Eddie" Coco (July 12, 1908 Palermo, Sicily – December 1991) was a former acting boss in the Lucchese family. In the 1940s, Coco worked with James Plumeri, Frank Palermo, Harry Segal and Felix Bocchicchio for soldier Frankie Carbo, in a group known as "The Combination", an arm of Murder, Inc. which acted as boxing promoters; the group was accused of fixing matches. During this time, Coco met Rocky Graziano, then an amateur boxer fighting on the Lower East Side. He helped Graziano start a professional boxing career and throughout the following years was viewed as a de facto boxing manager. In the late 1940s, Coco was suspected of placing wagers and taking bets on fights while Graziano was accused of taking bribes. These accusations continued until Graziano retired in 1952. In 1953, Coco was arrested in Florida for murdering a Miami car-wash operator in a dispute over a bill. On November 12, 1953, Coco was sentenced to life in prison. During the 1963 McClellan hearings, government witness Joseph Valachi identified Coco as a capo in Gaetano "Tommy" Lucchese's crime family. In 1965, Coco was released from prison after serving ten years on his life sentence. He stayed in Florida and was under government surveillance. In July 1967, family boss Thomas Lucchese died and Coco became a candidate to become the new boss. He served as acting boss in 1967. In late 1967, Anthony "Tony Ducks" Corallo went to Florida and met with Coco. Coco later stepped down as acting boss and Carmine Tramunti became the new boss. Coco continued to operate as a capo under Tramunti, with criminal activities in New York and Florida that kept him under strict government watch.

In 1972, Coco, his brother-in-law James Michael Falco and Louis "Louis Nash" Nakaladski were indicted in Miami on extortion and loansharking charges. During the trial, witness Joel Whitice testified that he borrowed money in the late 1960s from Falco. He made payments to Falco, Coco and Nash, and described Coco as the leader of a loan-sharking ring. Coco was convicted and sentenced to fifteen years in prison on loan-sharking and extortion. By the late 1980s, Coco was considered a semi-retired mobster living in Florida. In 1986, he served as consigliere for the Lucchese family while boss Anthony Corallo, Salvatore Santoro and Christopher Furnari were on trial in the Commission Case. Coco later stepped down and continued to operate in New York and Florida.

In 1986, Coco created a bingo operation to launder money from criminal rackets. The mobsters used Bingo World, a company operating bingo halls in several states, to launder the money. Coco and Chicago Outfit members Dominic Cortina and Donald Angelini became silent partners in the company. The new owner, Stephen Paskind, served as the front owner of the company; while claiming he controlled 84% he actually only had 42%. Izaak Silber soon joined in the bingo operation. In 1991, Coco and his bingo partners were arrested. In December 1991, Coco died while awaiting trial on money laundering.

=== Ralph Cuomo ===
Ralph "Raffie" Cuomo (1933 – April 2008), also known as "Raffaele", was a soldier who owned Ray's Pizza on Prince Street between Elizabeth and Mott Streets in Little Italy. In 1959, Cuomo opened the first "Ray's Pizza"; he later opened another on the Upper East Side. In 1969, he was convicted of drug trafficking after being found with 50 pounds of heroin. In 1995, Cuomo was arrested and charged with operating a drug network out of Ray's Pizza on Prince Street in New York. In 1998, Cuomo was sentenced to four years in prison for making heroin sales in the pizzeria. He was released from prison on May 24, 2002. Cuomo died in 2008 from complications of diabetes and a heart ailment. In October 2011, Cuomo's pizzeria "Ray's Pizza" on Prince Street closed over a rent dispute. Cuomo's pizzeria "Ray's Pizza" was later sold for almost $6 million.

=== Domenico Cutaia ===
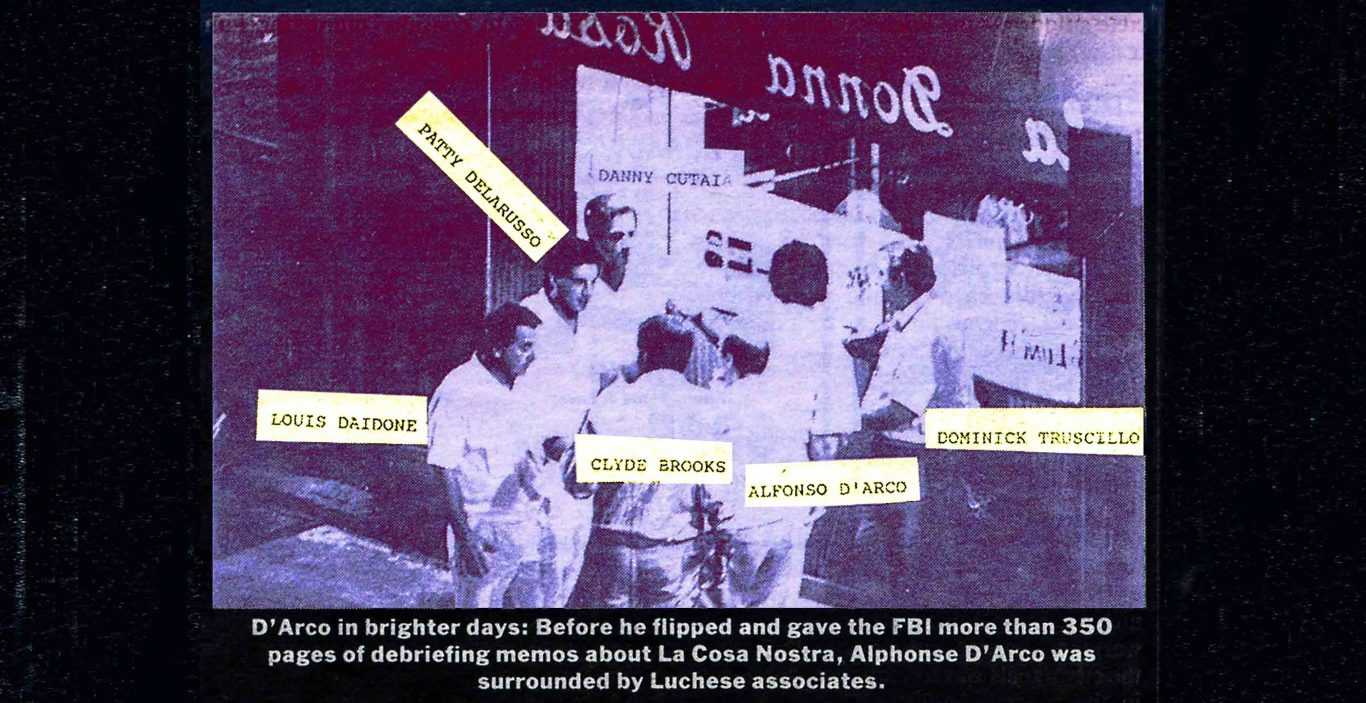
FBI surveillance photo of Danny Cutaia, Patty Dellorusso, Louis Daidone, Dominick Truscello, Alphonse D'Arco and Clyde Brooks

Domenico "Danny" Cutaia (November 22, 1936 – August 14, 2018), born in East New York Brooklyn, was the capo of the Vario Crew operating from Brooklyn. His son Salvatore Cutaia is a member of the crew. His daughter Danielle married John Baudanza, who later became a member of the Lucchese family. Cutaia worked as a loan shark and as a chauffeur for capo Paul Vario. While working for capo Paul Vario, Cutaia also controlled some illegal gambling operations and had control of the carpenters union local in Brooklyn. He later took over as capo of Vario's crew in Brooklyn. During the early 1990s he was a member of a ruling panel along with Steven Crea and Joseph DeFede running the crime family. In 1995, Cutaia was indicted for extortion, loan sharking and racketeering; in 1996, he pled guilty to extortionate extensions of credit and was sentenced to thirty months in prison. In 2002, Cutaia was indicted on loan sharking charges; he pled guilty and was sentenced to two years and three years of supervised probation upon his release. In August 2005, he was released from prison.

His parole terms banned him from communicating with family members until August 2008. However, in January 2007, it was reported that Cutaia was the primary liaison between jailed boss Vittorio "Vic" Amuso and the three man panel of capos who were running the family. On February 28, 2008, Cutaia, his son Salvatore, his son-in-law John Baudanza, and former acting capo Michael Corcione were indicted on federal racketeering charges that included loansharking, extortionate collection of credit, extortion, marijuana distribution conspiracy, illegal gambling, bank fraud and mail fraud for activities dating back to the 1980s. On October 25, 2009, Cutaia was sentenced to 39 months in federal prison for bank fraud. At the sentencing, Cutaia's attorney asked the court for home confinement, saying that Cutaia suffered from depression and advanced multiple sclerosis; the request was denied. In October 2012, Cutaia was sentenced to one year in prison for loan sharking. Cutaia was released from prison on October 4, 2013. He died on August 14, 2018.

=== Paul Correale ===
Paul "Paulie Ham" Correale (April 25, 1911 – died 1962) was a capo in the Lucchese family. Correale controlled gambling and narcotics in East Harlem. In December 1930, Correale and Carmine Tramunti had charges of robbery dropped and they were released from jail. Correale ran a Lucchese family gambling club between Second Avenue and East 112th Street in East Harlem. In 1952, Joseph Valachi and others murdered Eugenio Giannini near Correale's club.

=== Joseph Datello ===
Joseph "Big Joe" Datello (May 16, 1951 – February 23, 2024), also known as "Joey Glasses", is a soldier in the "Prince Street Crew". In December 1999, Datello and Steven Crea talked about bribery and extortion with Sean Richard, the son-in-law of John Riggi who was wearing a hidden recording device. On September 6, 2000, the district attorney used the information obtained from Richard's to indict Datello, Steven Crea, Joseph Tangorra and Dominic Truscello, soldiers Philip DeSimone, Arthur Zambardi, Anthony Pezzullo, and Joseph Truncale on labor racketeering, extortion, and bid-rigging charges. The indictment identified Datello as soldier in the "Prince Street crew" of captain Dominic Truscello and along with associate Sean Richard were involved in labor racketeering and bid rigging. On March 7, 2003, Datello pleaded guilty to extorting "Commercial Brick", a construction company, wire fraud in relation to a construction project at the Park Central Hotel, and loansharking. He was released from prison on August 5, 2005.

In November 2009, Datello was indicted along with acting capo Anthony Croce and charged with running a sports gambling operations from his bar "Night Gallery" in New Dorp, Staten Island. On May 31, 2017, Datello, along with Street Boss Matthew Madonna, Underboss Steven Crea Sr., Consigliere Joseph DiNapoli, Capo Steven Crea Jr., Capo Dominic Truscello, Capo John Castelucci, Acting Capo Tindaro Corso and other members of the family were indicted and charged with racketeering, murder, narcotics (cocaine, heroin, marijuana, prescribed medication), and firearms offenses. On September 24, 2018, Datello pleaded guilty to conspiracy to commit racketeering, including the attempted murder of the witness, narcotics trafficking, and collecting debts through the threat of violence. On January 4, 2019, Datello was received a 14-year prison sentence. The attempted murder of a witness dates back to October 2016, when Datello traveled to New Hampshire to murder a witness with the approval of Steven Crea. On January 17, 2023, Datello was released from prison years earlier than his projected release date of May 5, 2029. On February 23, 2024, Datello died.

=== Anthony Delasco ===
Anthony "Ham" Delasco (sometimes spelled Dolasco) was a former boxer and capo in New Jersey. In the 1950s, he took over The Jersey Crew after Settimo Accardi was deported. Delasco ran his crew from East Orange, New Jersey, where he controlled jukebox machines, cigarette vending machines, illegal gambling and loan-sharking operations in Newark, New Jersey. In the late 1950s, Delasco took Anthony Accetturo as his protege. When Delasco died in the late 1960s, Accetturo took over his rackets.

=== Anthony DiLapi ===
Anthony DiLapi (February 9, 1936 – February 4, 1990), also known as "Blue Eyes over the Bridges" or "Fat Anthony", was a soldier. His uncle, Salvatore Santoro, was a former underboss in the Lucchese family. DiLapi controlled the Lucchese family's Teamsters union local in New York City's Garment District and a bookmaking business, and owned part of a vending machine company in Brooklyn. He also worked with Thomas Gambino, the son of Carlo Gambino and son-in-law of Thomas Lucchese, in extorting businesses in the Garment District. He was released from prison on October 18, 1985.

After being released from prison, DiLapi was summoned to a meeting with Anthony Casso, and fled. Casso ordered Burton Kaplan to use two NYPD detectives on his payroll, Louis Eppolito and Stephen Caracappa, to track down DiLapi. The two detectives found him in Reseda, California. Vic Amuso and Anthony Casso then ordered Joseph "Little Joe" D'Arco to kill DiLapi. On February 4, 1990, D'Arco shot DiLapi to death in his Hollywood, California, apartment building's underground garage. DiLapi was shot five times in the face and four times in the body. On April 6, 2006, Eppolito and Caracappa were convicted of murder for their role in eight mob killings, including that of Anthony DiLapi.

=== Joseph DiNapoli ===
Joseph "Joey D." DiNapoli (born July 12, 1935 – November 25, 2024) is the former consigliere in the Lucchese family. He has two brothers, Vincent and Louis, who are both members of the Genovese crime family. DiNapoli was a member of the East Harlem Purple Gang.

In 1969, DiNapoli was arrested in New York on gambling charges. During the early 1970s, DiNapoli was a member of Carmine Tramunti's Harlem crew, overseeing Tramunti's narcotic and loansharking rackets. The FBI and DEA surveillance teams would observe DiNapoli frequently spending time at Tramunti's hangouts the Beach Rose Social Club and LoPiccolo's Espresso House in the Bronx. In 1973, DiNapoli was charged with Pat Dilacio with possession of two kilograms of heroin with intent to distribute in December, 1971; Dinapoli was also charged with Frank "Butch" Pugliese on narcotics charges. DiNapoli was arrested with Vincent Papa they had a suitcase containing $967,450 in cash. In 1974, DiNapoli was convicted along with William Alonzo, Joseph Ceriale, Donato Christiano, Vincent D'Amico, John Gamba, Louis Inglese, Angelo Mamone, Frank Pugliese, Warren C. Robinson, Frank Russo, Henry Salley, John Springer, Carmine Tramunti and Hattie Ware on numerous counts federal narcotics laws. During the case it was revealed that DiNapoli was a major loanshark and was convicted and sentenced to three years imprisonment. In 1975, DiNapoli was convicted of extortion and tax evasion and was sentenced to twenty-one years in prison he was released from prison in 1982. DiNapoli worked along with his brothers for the Genovese family boss Anthony Salerno construction extortions rackets. In 1981, DiNapoli was identified as a caporegime and indicted on extortion and Labor racketeering charges after he was requiring payoffs in order to permit contractors to use non-Union workers on construction projects in New Jersey and New York City.

In 1993, DiNapoli was indicted on federal loansharking charges; he was convicted in 1995 and sentenced to thirty months in prison. In 1995, DiNapoli was indicted twice the first was on federal mail fraud conspiracy charges and the second indicted was on New York state racketeering charges. The second indictment was released on May 17, 1995, Dinapoli along with his brother Louis DiNapoli were indicted for illegally obtaining $5 million in asbestos-removal and construction contracts from New York City and New York state agencies that were intended for minority-owned companies. It appeared that the three companies were owned by an African-American man, a Hispanic man and a woman, but their efforts had been plagued by abuses, including allegations that many companies benefiting from the programs were controlled by white businessmen. He was later convicted in that case and sentenced to three years in prison. In 1996, DiNapoli pleaded guilty in the federal mail fraud conspiracy case. On September 17, 1999, DiNapoli was released from prison. In 2000, after the Lucchese Construction Group indictment, DiNapoli was identified as a capo in the family, when Philip DeSimone and Arthur Zambardi who were soldiers in his crew were arrested along with Steven Crea and others.

In 2003, imprisoned boss Vic Amuso put a ruling panel which consisted of capos Aniello Migliore, Matthew Madonna and DiNapoli in control of the family. On December 18, 2007, New Jersey law enforcement indicted and arrested DiNapoli along with Matthew Madonna, New Jersey faction capos Ralph V. Perna, Nicodemo Scarfo Jr. and other members and associates of the Lucchese family. The indictment revealed that during investigation "Operation Heat" law enforcement agencies uncovered a $2.2 billion illegal gambling, money laundering and racketeering ring from New Jersey to Costa Rica. On October 1, 2009, DiNapoli was indicted in New York along with Matthew Madonna and 27 others in a racketeering scheme that made approximately $400 million from gambling, loansharking, gun trafficking and extortion. On February 12, 2016, DiNapoli pleaded guilty in New Jersey to racketeering in Operation Heat and was sentenced on April 20, 2016, to three years in New Jersey State prison. Also on April 20, 2016, DiNapoli was sentenced to one to three years in prison for his 2009 New York illegal gambling indictment. It was decided that both the New York and New Jersey sentences will be served concurrently in a New Jersey State Prison.

On May 31, 2017, family consigliere DiNapoli along with Street Boss Matthew Madonna, Underboss Steven Crea Sr., Capo Steven Crea Jr., Capo Dominic Truscello, Capo John Castelucci, Acting Capo Tindaro Corso and other members of the family were indicted and charged with racketeering, murder, narcotics (cocaine, heroin, marijuana, prescribed medication), and firearms offenses. The indictment builds on charges previously filed against a reputed Lucchese soldier and associate in February 2017 with the murder of Michael Meldish in the Bronx on November 15, 2013; Matthew Madonna, Crea, and Crea Jr. were charged and suspected of serving as co-conspirators in the Meldish gangland execution too. In January 2019, DiNapoli and John Castelucci pleaded guilty and await sentencing. In May 2019, during the testimony of government witness John Pennisi it was revealed that in 2017, imprisoned for life boss Vic Amuso sent a letter to Underboss Steven Crea which stated that DeSantis would take over as acting boss replacing Bronx based Matthew Madonna. It was also revealed by law-enforcement agents that Andrew DeSimone became the family's new Consigliere in 2017 replacing DiNapoli. He was later sentenced to 52 months in prison and received a $250,000 fine for racketeering conspiracy. On January 11, 2023, DiNapoli was released from prison. On November 25, 2024, DiNapoli died at Jacoby Hospital at the age of 89.

=== Salvatore DiSimone ===
Salvatore "Sally Bo" DiSimone (sometimes spelled DeSimone) (died October 2017), was a former capo. His son Anthony was a member of the Tanglewood Boys. In 1994, his son Anthony went into hiding after the murder of Louis Balancio. In 1999, his son Anthony turned himself in to the police and was sentenced in 2000 to 25 years to life. On December 22, 2003, a soldier in his crew, Albert J. Circelli Jr. was shot and killed inside Rao's, an Italian restaurant located in Harlem by mafia associate Louis "Louie Lump Lump" Barone. In 2005, the FBI revealed that DiSimone and Lucchese soldier Daniel Latella had meetings in doctors' offices with Gambino family capo Greg DePalma. His son Anthony DiSimone served seven years in prison before the conviction was overturned; he later pled guilty to manslaughter in 2010, and served no additional time. DiSimone's other son Andrew DiSimone became a made member in the Lucchese family. Salvatore DiSimone died in October 2017. In 2018, a soldier in his crew Dominick Capelli was indicted for operating a large illegal gambling operation in Westchester.

=== Christopher Furnari ===
Christopher "Christie Tick" Furnari Sr. (April 30, 1924 – May 28, 2018) was a former consigliere until his 1986 racketeering conviction. He was sentenced to 100 years in prison before being released in 2014, after serving almost 28 years.

Furnari was born in 1924 in New York to first-generation Sicilian-Italian emigrants from Furnari, a commune in the Province of Messina in Sicily. By age 15, Furnari was managing his own loanshark operations in Brooklyn and Northern New Jersey. By 1943, the 19-year-old Furnari had already served two prison terms for armed robbery. Furnari was also sentenced to 15 to 30 years after he and several other youths were arrested with three girls in a car and charged with rape.

In 1956, Furnari was released from prison on parole. Furnari became an associate of Thomas Lucchese's crime family through Furnari's connection with mobster Anthony Corallo. During the late 1950s, Furnari became involved in illegal gambling and loansharking. Furnari soon became an influential member of the Brooklyn faction of the family and was earning $25,000 a day. In 1962, at age 38, Furnari became a made man in the Lucchese family. In 1964, Furnari became a caporegime.

The Lucchese powerbase was traditionally in Manhattan and the Bronx, the family's birthplace; the family's first three bosses, Gaetano "Tom" Reina, Tommaso "Tommy" Gagliano and Thomas Lucchese, were all from this area. In contrast, Furnari belonged to the less influential Brooklyn faction. Furnari operated his crew in Bensonhurst at the 19th Hole, an undistinguished bar and mob social club. His crew was involved in illegal gambling, loansharking, extortion, burglary, narcotics dealing, occasional murder contracts, and union and construction rackets. At this time, Furnari's criminal record included convictions for assault and sex offenses.

Furnari controlled New York District Council 9, which represented 6,000 workers who painted and decorated hotels, bridges and subway stations in New York. Furnari managed the Council through the union secretary and treasurer, James Bishop and Bishop's associate, Frank Arnold. Bishop and Arnold would pick up cash payments from the contractors, who charged a 10 to 15 percent tax on all major commercial painting jobs, and passed the payments to Furnari.

The 19th Hole, Furnari's social club, was the hub of criminal activity in Bensonhurst. Mobsters from every New York crime family conducted business in the club and socialized over food and drink. In the mid-1960s, aspiring mobsters Vittorio "Vic" Amuso and Anthony "Gaspipe" Casso joined Furnari's crew. Furnari saw that both men could make money and were willing to use violence if needed. Furnari put Amuso and Casso in charge of a large bookmaking operation and debt collecting operation.

In 1967, family boss Thomas Lucchese died of a brain tumor, leaving the family to be run by an interim boss, Carmine "Mr. Gribbs" Tramunti. Lucchese's real successor, Anthony "Tony Ducks" Corallo, was convicted of bribery in 1967 and sentenced in 1968 to prison for two years. Tramunti served as acting boss, even after Corallo was released from prison in 1970. In 1973, with Tramunti's imprisonment, Corallo finally became the official Lucchese boss.

In the early 1970s, the Five Families of New York organized crime decided to "open the books', allowing a new generation of mob associates to become made men. Furnari immediately sponsored Amuso and Casso for family membership and then made them overseers of the "Bypass Gang", a highly successful burglary ring. During the 1970s and 1980s, the Bypass Gang reportedly stole hundreds of millions of dollars in cash, jewelry and other merchandise.

In January 1972, Furnari backed and sanctioned the squad of armed robbers who took the Pierre Hotel in Manhattan under siege and stole around $3 million in jewels and cash. The Pierre Hotel robbery stands as the largest unrecovered hotel robbery in history. The case was never solved: none of the perpetrators ever confessed to the heist and only a diamond necklace valued at $780,000 was recovered. The eight brazen armed robbers were Robert Comfort, Sammy Nalo, Donald 'Tony the Greek' Frankos, Al Green, Ali Ben, Robert "Bobby" Germaine and Al Visconti.

In 1980, Furnari was promoted to consigliere in the Lucchese family. He wanted Casso to take over as capo of the 19th Hole crew, but Casso declined and endorsed Amuso instead. Casso opted to become Furnari's aide; a consigliere is allowed to have one soldier work directly for him.

Furnari enjoyed enormous influence both within his own family, the other New York families, and crime families from various U.S. cities. Furnari continued to oversee his criminal interests from the 19th Hole, but spent much of his time providing advice and mediation for family members as well as settling disputes with the other families. Furnari reigned as one of New York's top Mafia bosses throughout the early 1980s until his 1985 racketeering indictment.

On February 25, 1985, Furnari was indicted in the Mafia Commission case, the most comprehensive Racketeer Influenced and Corrupt Organizations Act (RICO) prosecution brought against the mob at the time. Furnari was indicted as a result of a Federal Bureau of Investigation (FBI) probe that used undercover surveillance and bugging techniques against the mob leaders. The bug that snared Furnari had been placed in Salvatore Avellino's Jaguar car. FBI surveillance recorded Corallo conducting business with Furnari and other family leaders. Pleading not guilty to the charges, Furnari was released on $1.75 million bail pending trial.

In early 1986, while Furnari was awaiting the Commission trial, the Lucchese family uncovered a new, potentially lucrative racket. A Russian-American crime family based in Brighton Beach in Brooklyn, run by Ukrainian immigrant Marat Balagula, had started to bootleg gasoline. By collecting gasoline taxes from customers and then not paying them to the government, Balagula was making very large profits. When Colombo crime family capo Michael Franzese started pressing Balagula for extortion payments, Balagula went to Furnari for help. Casso later reported on a meeting at the 19th Hole, in which Furnari told Balagula,

Here there's enough for everybody to be happy... to leave the table satisfied. What we must avoid is trouble between us and the other families. I propose to make a deal with the others so there's no bad blood.... Meanwhile, we will send word out that from now on you and your people are with the Lucchese family. No one will bother you. If anyone does bother you, come to us and Anthony will take care of it.

As a result of the 19th Hole meeting, the Five Families imposed a two cent per gallon "Family tax" on Balagula's bootlegging operation, which became their greatest moneymaker after drug trafficking. According to one former associate,

The LCN reminded Marat of the apparatchiks in the Soviet Union. He thought as long as he gave them something they would be valuable allies. Then all of a sudden he was at risk of being killed if he couldn't pay to the penny.

According to author Philip Carlo,

It didn't take long for word on the street to reach the Russian underworld: Marat Balagula was paying off the Italians; Balagula was a punk; Balagula had no balls. Balagula's days were numbered. This, of course, was the beginning of serious trouble. Balagula did in fact have balls, he was a ruthless killer when necessary, but he also was a smart diplomatic administrator and he knew that the combined, concerted force of the Italian crime families would quickly wipe the newly arrived Russian competition off the proverbial map.

On June 12, 1986, one of Balagula's rivals, Russian-American gangster Vladimir Reznikov, entered Balagula's nightclub in Brighton Beach. Reznikov pushed a 9mm Beretta handgun against Balagula's skull and demanded $600,000 and a percentage of Balagula's rackets. After Balagula acceded to his demands, Reznikov told him, "Fuck with me and you're dead, you and your whole fucking family; I swear I'll fuck and kill your wife as you watch, you understand?"

After Reznikov left the nightclub, Balagula suffered a massive heart attack. He insisted, however, on being treated at his home in Brighton Beach, where he felt safer. At home, Balagula asked Casso to come help him. Casso gave these instructions to Balagula, "Send word to Vladimir that you have his money, that he should come to the club tomorrow. We'll take care of the rest." Casso also requested a photograph of Reznikov and a description of his car.

The next day, Reznikov arrived at Balagula's nightclub to pick up his money. Lucchese soldier Joseph Testa confronted Reznikov and fatally shot him. According to Casso, "After that, Marat didn't have any problems with other Russians."

In September 1986, Furnari went on trial in the famous New York Mafia Commission case, along with Corallo and underboss Salvatore "Tom Mix" Santoro. The charges included extortion and labor racketeering within the construction industry and murder for hire of former Bonanno crime family boss Carmine "Lilo" Galante. Galante had been gunned down on July 12, 1979, allegedly on the orders of the Commission. Some have argued that Furnari wasn't on the Commission then and had no connection with the Galante hit. However, Furnari could not use this as a defense argument.

By the fall of 1986, Corallo realized that he, Santoro and Furnari would not only be convicted, but were facing sentences that would all but assure they would die in prison. Furnari persuaded Corallo that either Amuso or Casso should become the new boss. At a meeting in Furnari's home, Furnari, Amuso and Casso all agreed that Amuso should succeed Corallo as boss.

On November 19, 1986, Furnari was convicted on all counts, including the Galante murder. On January 13, 1987, Furnari was sentenced to 100 years in prison without parole and fined $240,000.

With the imprisonment of Corallo and Furnari, Amuso became boss, and Casso became consigliere and later underboss. Peter "Fat Pete" Chiodo took over Furnari's Bensonhurst crew.

In 1990, Amuso and Casso became fugitives to avoid prosecution in the famous "Windows Case". In 1992, Amuso was captured and sentenced to life in prison. In 1993, Casso was also captured, but in 1994, he struck a deal with the government to testify against Furnari and other family leaders.

In 1995, Furnari started challenging the "no parole" stipulation of his sentence in court. The government had previously revoked Casso's witness deal with prosecutors, and in 1996, Casso was sentenced to life in prison. Furnari's lawyers insisted Casso's court testimony against Furnari was tainted.

In July 2000, the Third Circuit Federal Court of Appeals ruled that the parole board officials had been denying Furnari's parole eligibility on the tainted assertions of mob turncoat Casso. However, in 2001, the Bureau of Prisons National Appeal Board ruled that Furnari was a multiple murderer and was not eligible for parole, based on what some people considered to be Casso's discredited testimony. On February 15, 2006, Furnari filed a habeas corpus petition in District Court claiming that the United States parole commission had improperly denied him parole. On June 20, 2007, the court denied his petition.

Furnari was imprisoned in the Allenwood Medium Federal Correctional Institution (FCI) in Allenwood, Pennsylvania. His projected release date was November 24, 2044, effectively a life sentence. However, since he was convicted before Congress eliminated parole for federal prisoners, he and his co-defendants became eligible for parole in 1996. Furnari was the only defendant to be granted early release by the U.S. Parole Commission, most likely relating to the weak evidence behind his murder conviction. Furnari was released from a prison hospital in Minnesota on September 19, 2014, after serving 28 years. On May 28, 2018, Furnari died at his home in Staten Island, New York.

=== Stefano LaSalle ===
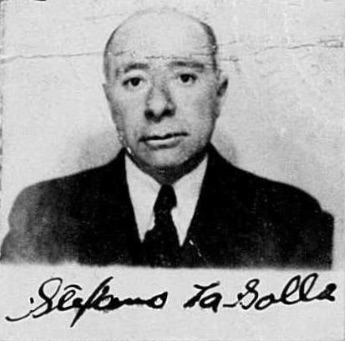
Stefano LaSalle

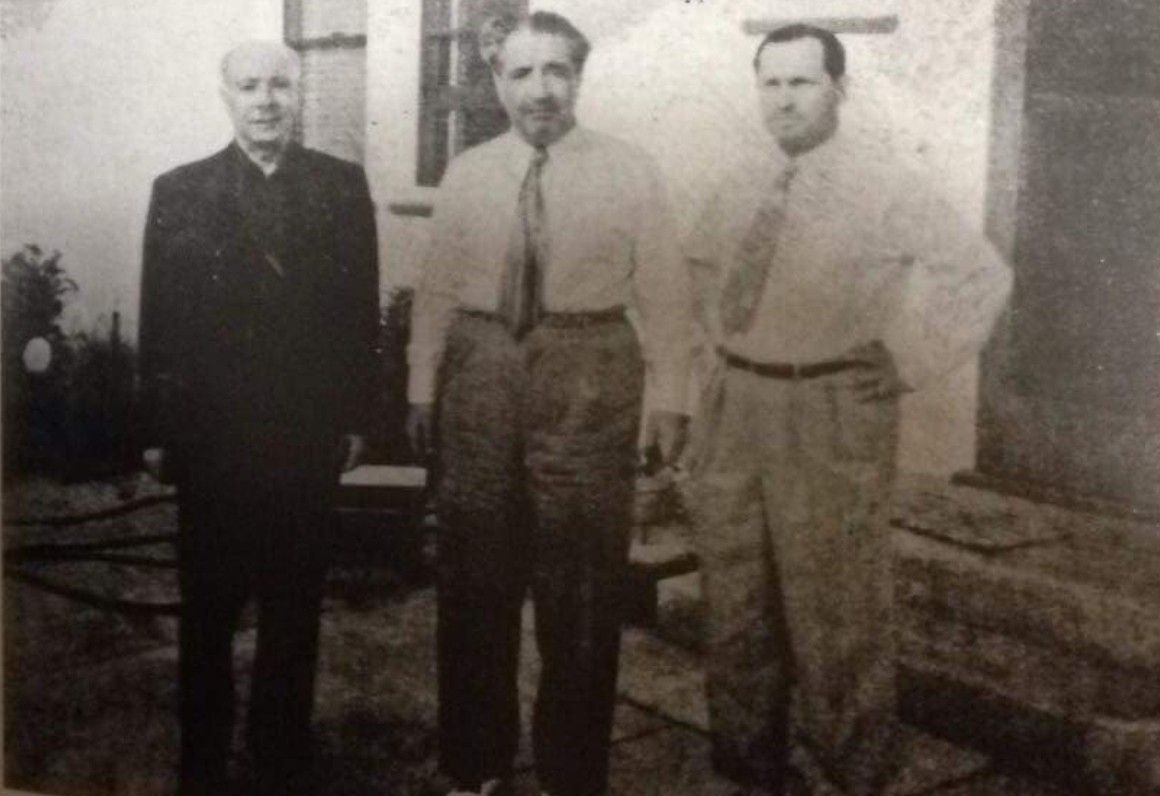
Left to right: Stefano LaSalle, LA crime family boss Jack Dragna and Lucchese c.1948

Stefano "Steve" LaSalle (November 5, 1888 – November 1975), real name LaSala, was an early member of the Morello family; he later joined Reina's family. In 1915, East Harlem's Italian lottery "king" Giosue Gallucci was murdered, allowing LaSalle and Tommaso Lomonte to take over the lottery games. LaSalle served as underboss to Thomas Lucchese and later Carmine Tramunti, until the 1970s when he retired. In 1975, LaSalle died in Queens, New York City.

=== Frank Lastorino ===
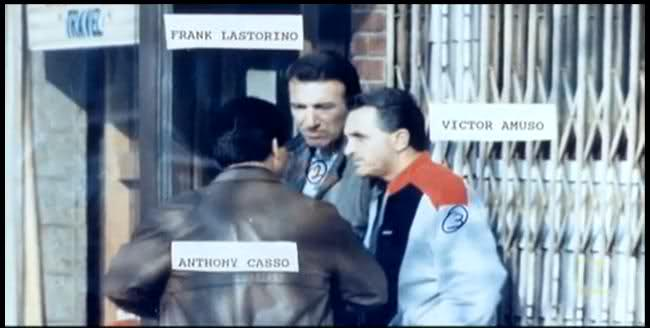
FBI surveillance photograph of the Lucchese crime family members Vic Amuso, Anthony Casso and Frank Lastorino

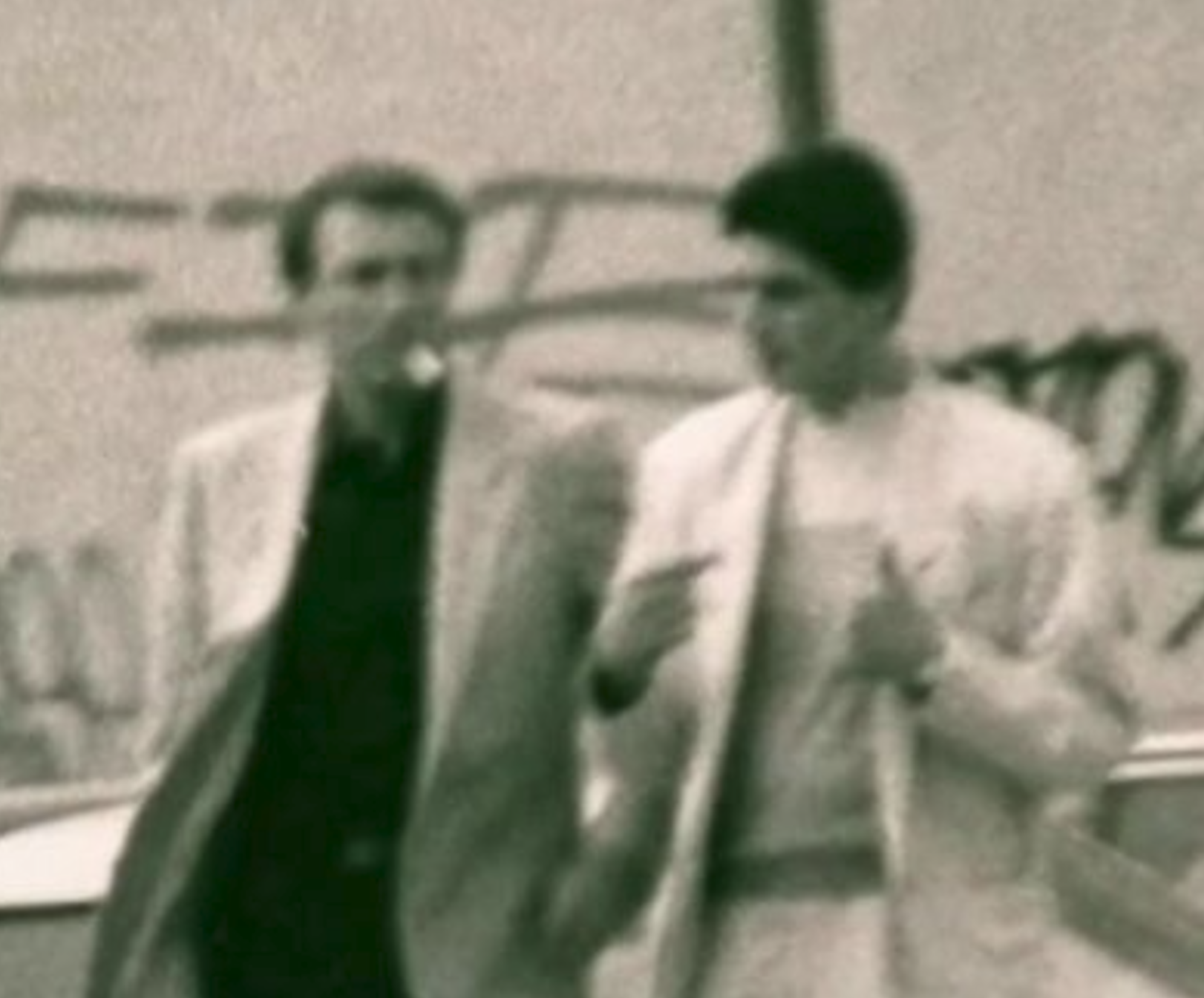
FBI surveillance photo of Frank Lastorino (left) and Anthony Senter

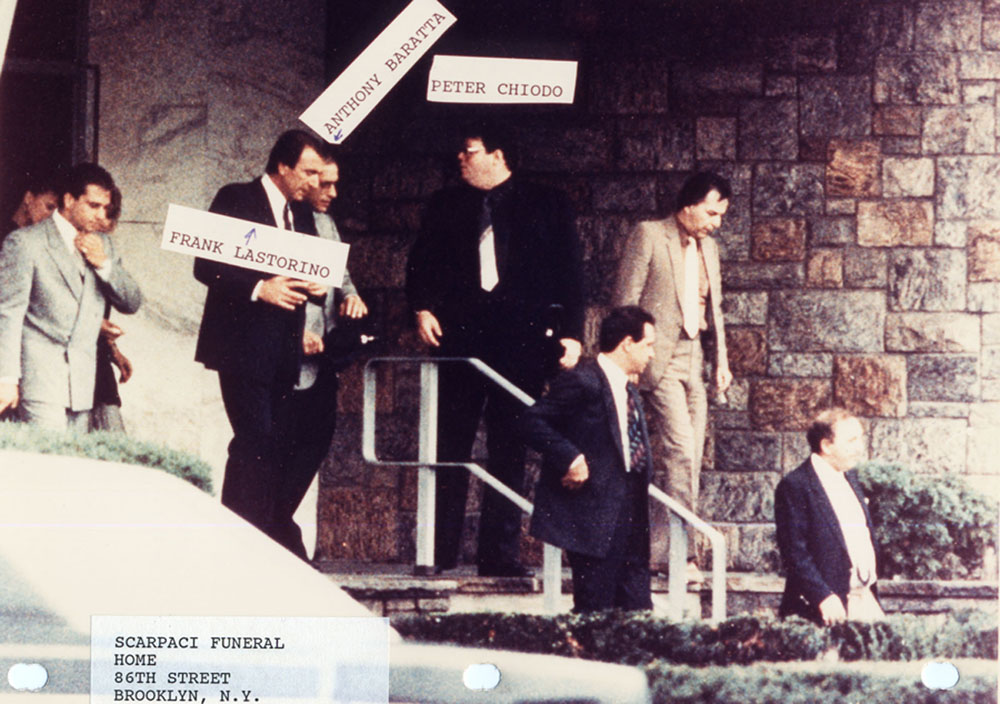
FBI surveillance photograph of Lastorino, Baratta and Chiodo

Frank "Big Frank" Lastorino (April 9, 1939 – November 5, 2022) was a soldier, caporegime and consigliere of the Lucchese family. Lastorino was formally inducted into the crime family in 1987. In the late 1980s, the family's consigliere Christopher Furnari put Lastorino in charge of the Lucchese family's portion of a bootleg gasoline scheme with Russian mobster Marat Balagula. In August 1990, Lastorino was ordered by Anthony Casso to murder mobster Bruno Facciola. The order to murder Facciola was given after Casso had received information from two NYPD police detectives Louis Eppolito and Stephen Caracappa on his payroll that Bruno Facciola was an informant. On August 24, 1990, Frank Lastorino, Louie Daidone and Richard Pagliarulo murdered Bruno Facciola. Lastorino arranged to bring Facciola to a Brooklyn garage, where Lastorino stabbed Facciola and Pagliarulo shot him six times in the face and chest. Daidone stuffed a dead canary into Facciola's mouth, put his body in the trunk of his 1985 Mercury sedan and abandoned the car on East Fifty-Fifth Street in Canarsie. In April 1991, Lastorino was ordered by Anthony Casso to murder Gambino family capo Bartholomew Boriello, who was a former bodyguard of John Gotti. On April 13, 1991, Lastorino shot Boriello to death outside his Bensonhurst, Brooklyn home. The Boriello murder was allegedly performed with the assistance of Louis Eppolito and Stephen Caracappa. In September 1991, during a Staten Island meeting, Vic Amuso and Anthony Casso replaced Alphonse D'Arco as acting boss and created a four-man ruling panel that consisted of Lastorino, Alphonse D'Arco, Anthony Baratta and Salvatore Avellino. On September 18, 1991, Lastorino, along with capo Anthony Baratta and soldier Mike DeSantis, conspired to kill Alphonse D'Arco in the Kimberly Hotel in Manhattan but failed. D'Arco defected on September 21, 1991, and became a government witness.

In October 1991, Lastorino, along with Anthony Baratta, Salvatore Avellino, Richard Pagliarulo, Anthony Tortorello, George Conte, Thomas Anzellotto and Frank Papagni inducted (made) Thomas D'Ambrosia, Joseph Tortorello Jr., Frank Gioia Jr., Gregory Cappello and Jody Calabrese into the crime family during a ceremony that was held in a Howard Beach, Queens home. Some time after, Lastorino was appointed consigliere of the family. It was later revealed by government informant Frank Gioia Jr. that Lastorino was ordered by Anthony Casso to murder Patrick Testa on December 2, 1992. Casso intended to blame the murder on the Gambino family in a plot to kill John A. Gotti. In April 1993, Lastorino was indicted and jailed along with Michael DeSantis and Richard Pagliarulo on murder conspiracy, extortion and other racketeering charges. During the May 16, 1994, trial, the prosecution planned to use government witnesses and former Lucchese mobsters Alphonse D'Arco, Peter Chiodo and associate Corrado Marino to testify against Lastorino. In June 1995, Lastorino took a plea deal and was sentenced to 18 years in prison. Lastorino was released from prison on December 23, 2008, after serving 14 years in prison on conspiracy to commit murder, racketeering and several murders, including the murder of painters union official James Bishop. On June 22, 2011, his son Carl Lastorino attempted to kill Peter Argentina, shooting him in the hand and shoulder at a Brooklyn tire shop. When Carl tried to escape, he was shot to death by police in an apparent suicide-by-cop. Lastorino died on November 5, 2022, at age 83.

=== Carmine LoCascio ===
Carmine "Willie the Wop" LoCascio (September 23, 1911 – March 13, 1983) was a New York mobster who was involved in drug trafficking along with his brother Peter LoCascio. In 1929, he was arrested on bootlegging, narcotics and robbery. LoCascio would frequent Oldtimers Bar on 184th Street in Corona Queens. He worked with his brother Peter LoCascio, John Ormento, Sam Accardi, brothers Joseph and John Amici, Charles DeStefano, Charles Bracco, Salvatore Santoro, Joseph Marone and Charles Albero in various criminal rackets. On August 15, 1962, Carmine LoCascio, along with Lucchese mobster Angelo Loicano and Genovese family members Rosario and Joseph Mogavero were charged with transporting around 400 kilograms of heroin between January 1950 to August 1962 in the United States.

=== Peter LoCascio ===
Peter Joseph "Mr. Bread" LoCascio (June 10, 1916 – September 2, 1997) was a New York mobster involved in drug trafficker along with his older brother Carmine LoCascio. In 1935, he was arrested on illegal alcohol trafficking and narcotic trafficking. In the 1940s, LoCascio was identified as a major heroin drug trafficker. LoCascio would frequent been seen on the Lower East Side and Little Italy in Manhattan. He worked with his brother Carmine LoCascio, John Ormento, brothers Joseph and Peter DiPalermo, Rocco Mazzie, James Picarelli and Sammy Kass in many criminal rackets.

=== Anthony Loria Sr. ===
Anthony "Tony" Loria Sr., also known as "Tony Aboudamita", was a mobster who played a major role in the French Connection heroin scandal. Loria, along with his longtime partner Vincent Papa and his crew, are known as "The Men who Stole The French Connection".

Loria was known to federal agents and the Bureau of Narcotics and Dangerous Drugs as a major drug trafficker within the Lucchese crime family. He was convicted in 1961 of trafficking heroin but his conviction was overturned on appeal in 1968 because of violations of the Fourth Amendment.

He was implicated along with Papa, Anthony Passero, Virgil Alessi and Frank D'Amato in the New York Police Department scandal, in which over $70 million worth of drugs seized during the French Connection operation was stolen from the police property room. The crew stole 398 pounds of heroin and 120 pounds of cocaine from 1969 to 1972. In October 1973, Loria was indicted, along with the boss of the Lucchese Family Carmine Tramunti and 42 other mobsters, on drug dealing charges.

He died in 1989 from natural causes.

=== Joseph Lucchese ===
Joseph "Joe Brown" Lucchese (born April 13, 1910) was a capo and younger brother to Tommy Lucchese, the boss of the Lucchese crime family. He controlled gambling operations along with Aniello Migliore. In 1963, during the Valachi hearings, Lucchese was identified as a capo in the Lucchese family. He died during the early 1970s.

=== Anthony Luongo ===
Anthony "Buddy" Luongo was a former capo in the Harlem-Bronx faction. Luongo was a longtime protégé of Lucchese Underboss Salvatore "Tom Mix" Santoro and would meet him weekly at Santoro Beverage Company on Morris Park Ave in the Bronx. In 1986, Luongo tried to take over the Lucchese family after boss Anthony Corallo was imprisoned during the Commission case. According to informant Al D'Arco, the murder of Luongo was organized by Vic Amuso and Anthony Casso who suspected that Underboss Santoro was plotting with his two protégé Luongo and Anthony DiLapi to seize control of the family.

In December 1986, Luongo was lured to 19th Hole bar in Bensonhurst, Brooklyn to meet with Vic Amuso who persuaded Luongo meet him in nearby house. In the Brooklyn home Luongo met with Vic Amuso, Anthony Casso, Bobby Amuso and Dom Carbucci, until Bobby Amuso excused himself and returned killing Luongo by shooting him three times in the head. Luongo was buried somewhere in Canarsie, Brooklyn.

=== Mariano Macaluso ===
Mariano "Mac" Macaluso (born June 7, 1912) was a former member. He served as consigliere during the 1960s. In the 1960s, Macaluso became partners with Lucchese mobster Andimo "Tony Noto" Pappadio in Ideal Trucking and in Garment Carriers Corporation. In 1986, after the Mafia Commission Trial, Macaluso became the new underboss. In 1989, boss Vic Amuso forced him into retirement. In 1992, he died from natural causes.

=== Vincent Mancione ===
Vincent "Vinny Casablanca" Mancione (1964) was a soldier and former acting capo. In 2002, Mancione was indicted along with consigliere Joseph Caridi, capo John Cerrella and soldier Carmelo Profeta for extorting the Hudson & McCoy Fish House restaurant in Freeport, Long Island. Mancione was released from prison on August 2, 2006. Mancione died in 2013.

=== Thomas Mancuso ===
Thomas "Tommy Tea Balls" Mancuso (August 29, 1907 – 1981) was a former member of the Harlem crew. Mancuso and Carmine Tramunti were part owners of the Pussycat Bar and club in New York City. On August 14, 1968, Mancuso was indicted on narcotics charges; convicted on March 26, 1969, and sentenced to one year in prison. In 1980, Mancuso and Samuel Cavalieri were under investigation for corruption of Local 29 of Blasters, Miners and Drill runners Union. Mancuso died in 1981.

=== Frank Manzo ===
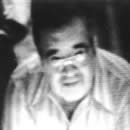
Frank Manzo in an FBI surveillance photo

Frank Manzo (February 2, 1925 – October 23, 2012), also known as "Francesco Manzo", "Frank Manse" and "Frankie the Wop", was a soldier in the Vario Crew who oversaw the family's interests at John F. Kennedy International Airport ("JFK") in Queens, New York. He served as a union delegate in the United Brotherhood of Carpenters and Joiners of America, controlled Local 295 and owned two trucking companies: LVF Air Cargo, Inc., and LVF Airport Service Inc. at JFK Airport. Manzo also owned Villa Capra, a restaurant in Cedarhurst, New York, where he conducted illegal activities.

In 1972, Manzo was kidnapped by James McBratney, Eddie Maloney, Tommy Genovese and Richie Chaisson. They held him for $150,000 in ransom, then released him when it was paid. In 1983, Manzo was heard in an FBI wiretap, saying, "We rule this airport". In 1985, Manzo, Local 295 President Frank Calise, Local 851 Vice-president Harry Davidoff, and others were indicted on charges of extorting shipping and trucking companies at JFK Airport. In 1986, Manzo pled guilty to racketeering and was sentenced to twelve years in prison and fined $325,000. On April 8, 1987, Manzo was banned from New Jersey casinos due to his history of involvement with organized crime.

Manzo was released from prison in 1994. In 1995, Manzo was charged with racketeering for extorting $2 million in payoffs from cement company owner John Quadrozzi over a 13-year span, between 1978 and 1991. However, the charges were dropped when the judge ruled that the crimes were covered under his 1986 plea agreement. On October 23, 2012, Manzo died in his sleep.

=== Aniello Migliore ===
Aniello "Neil" Migliore (October 1933 – September 11, 2019), born in Queens, New York, was a made man. He served as a capo, as the acting consigliere, and as the underboss on a ruling panel in the family. Migliore was a close associate of family bosses Tommy Lucchese and Anthony Corallo. He was recruited into the Lucchese family by capo Joseph Laratro, who controlled illegal gambling operations in Corona, Queens. By the late 1950s Migliore, a soldier, already was overseeing Laratro's illegal gambling operations from bookmaking, policy operations and large telephone setups. In 1957, it was reported that after paying tribute to his boss, Migliore was making $50,000 a day from running illegal gambling operations in New York City. On November 14, 1957, Migliore was suspected of driving boss Tommy Lucchese and underboss Steve LaSalle to the famous Apalachin Meeting, a national Cosa Nostra summit in Apalachin, New York, that was broken up by law enforcement. The next day on November 15, 1957, Migliore was in a car accident while driving through Binghamton, New York leading to more suspicion that he was supposed to attend the Apalachin Meeting.

On October 22, 1974, Migliore was indicted, along with members Frank Altimari, Nicholas Bonina, Anthony Romanello, Frank Ruggiero, Richard Rubino, Thomas DeMaio, brothers Michael Struzzieri and William Struzzieri, and NYPD police officer James Maxwell, on bribery charges in order to protect a gambling operation in Queens. Migliore as a capo represented the family's interest in Northberry Concrete, a Brooklyn-based contractor and member of the New York City's Concrete club. He also held a salesman position with "Port Dock and Stone", one of the main suppliers of trap rock to the two companies that controlled the production of concrete in New York City.

On March 21, 1986, Migliore was indicted, along with Genovese family acting boss Anthony Salerno, Genovese family captains Vincent Cafaro, Vincent DiNapoli and Giuseppe Sabato, Genovese family members Louis DiNapoli, Carmine Della Cava and Thomas Cafaro, and Cleveland crime family members John Tronolone and Milton Rockman, Gambino family member Alphonse Mosca, and four businessmen, Edward J. Halloran, Nicholas Auletta, Alvin O. Chattin and Richard Costa, on extortion and bid rigging charges. The charges alleged Migliore and other mobsters had rigged the bidding process for the supplying of concrete to high rise building projects in Manhattan such as the Trump Plaza and sites for Mount Sinai School of Medicine and Memorial Sloan-Kettering Cancer Center. In November 1986, The New York Times reported Migliore, a captain and owner of a Queens marble business who also controlled gambling operations with Joe Lucchese (the brother of former boss Thomas Lucchese) replaced Anthony Corallo as the new boss of the Lucchese family, after Corallo was convicted during the Commission trial. Former Lucchese mobster Alphonse D'Arco revealed that Vic Amuso was chosen as the new family boss and Migliore served as consigliere before being replaced by Anthony Casso when Migliore went to prison. On May 4, 1988, Migliore was convicted sentenced to 24 years in prison and fined $266,000.

In 1991, Migliore's conviction was overturned and he was released from prison. Migliore held an on-the-book job as a sales representative with a traprock supplier in the concrete business.

On April 3, 1992, Migliore was celebrating the birthday of a friend's granddaughter at Tesoro's Restaurant in Westbury, Long Island. During the party, a shooter in a passing car fired shotgun blasts through the restaurant window. Migliore was shot in the neck and upper body. Despite his wounds, Migliore survived.

On May 14, 1997, Migliore was released from prison.

In 2003, it was reported by author Jerry Capeci that the Lucchese crime family was being run by a three-man ruling committee consisting of Migliore, Matthew Madonna and Joseph DiNapoli in the absence of an acting boss. Migliore, who served as underboss in the past to Anthony Corallo, was considered the biggest influence on the ruling committee. Migliore died on September 11, 2019.

=== Marco Minuto ===
Marco "Big Marco" Minuto (born 1937 – August 2026), also known as "The Old Man", was a soldier operating in the Bronx faction. He worked for Lucchese capo Joe Giampa and controlled the Hunts Point Produce Market in the Bronx. Minuto's family-owned ice business supplied the needed ice to most of the tenants in the Hunts Point Produce Market. In 2001, Minuto was indicted along with Russian mobster Alex Lukov and five others for operating a four-year scheme to sell bootleg gasoline to Long Island gas stations, costing New York State millions of dollars in tax revenue by buying gas in New Jersey and smuggling it into New York. On August 15, 2006, Minuto was released from prison. On August 4, 2016, Minuto at the age of 80, was indicted along with 45 others on charges of criminal activities throughout the East Coast. Minto died in August 2026.

=== Richard Pagliarulo ===
Richard "Richie the Toupe" Pagliarulo (November 30, 1948 – 1999) was a hit man and former capo, who took over as capo of Peter Chiodo's old Bensonhurst crew. In 1991, Pagliarulo served as a member of a panel that conducted a Lucchese crime family induction ceremony in Howard Beach, Queens. He sponsored both Gregory "Whitey" Cappello and Jody Calabrese for membership during the ceremony. Pagliarulo was imprisoned on the information and testimony of Frank Gioia Jr. who stated that Pagliarulo helped Louis Daidone plan the murder of Bruno Facciola. He was later sentenced to life in prison for murder and racketeering.

Former Lucchese capo turned government informant Peter Chiodo, admitted that he ordered soldiers Pagliarulo and Michael "Baldy Mike" Spinelli to murder Lucchese associate Sarecho "Sammy the Arab" Nalo. On October 25, 1988, Sarecho Nalo was murdered, while on the phone with Greek crew boss Spiro Velentzas disputing gambling territory when Michael Spinelli pulled the trigger shooting him. In 1999, Pagliarulo died in prison of a heart attack.

=== Vincent Papa ===
Vincent C. Papa (December 5, 1917 – July 26, 1977) was a former made member in the family who became notorious for masterminding the theft of the French Connection heroin from the New York Police Department (NYPD) property office. Papa grew up in Astoria, Queens, and owned a tire company in the neighborhood. He had been arrested 28 times; two of the arrests were on drug charges. Papa ran his criminal operations from Ditmars Car Service, in Astoria, Queens, and from the Astoria Colts Social Club. He worked with mobsters Anthony Loria and Virgil Alessi.

Between 1969 and 1972, New York Police Department detectives James Farley, Joseph Nunziata, Frank King and others were paid by Papa to steal approximately $70 million in confiscated narcotics (heroin) from the New York City Police Property Clerk's office in Lower Manhattan. Papa was arrested on February 3, 1972, in a car parked on Bronxdale Avenue with Joseph DiNapoli in the back seat. There was a suitcase with $967,500 in hundred-dollar bills. In 1975, Papa was convicted and sent to the Atlanta Federal Prison in Atlanta, Georgia. In 1977, Papa was stabbed to death in prison. He is buried in St. John's Cemetery in Queens. Papa's infamous theft became famous after the movie French Connection II.

=== Andimo Pappadio ===
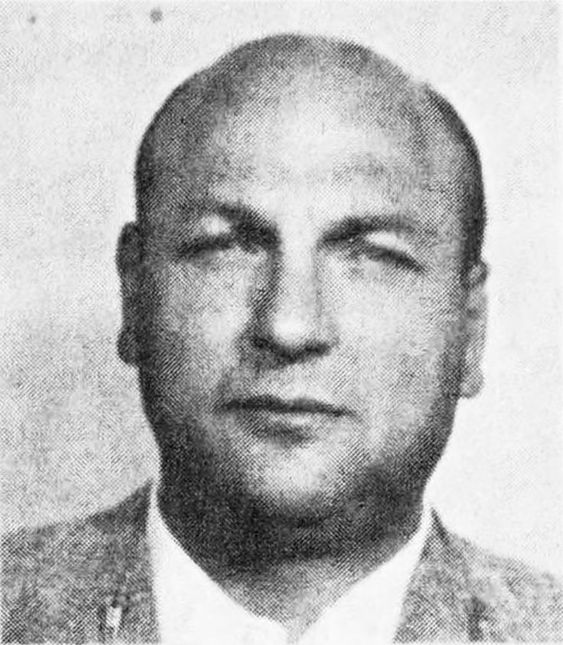
Mugshot of Andimo Pappadio

Andimo "Tony Noto" Pappadio (1912–1976) was a former member of who controlled the Lucchese family's garment district racket. In the 1960s, Pappadio became partners with Lucchese mobster Mariano Macaluso in Ideal Trucking and in Garment Carriers Corporation. In 1965, Pappadio was sentenced to two years in prison for refusing to answer questions before a Federal grand jury in Manhattan about meeting with Tommy Lucchese. In the 1970s, his two brothers Fred and Michael Pappadio joined him in controlling Ideal Trucking in the Garment district. In 1975, Pappadio was suspected of controlling construction contracts of the Suffolk County Meadows horse racetrack. On September 24, 1976, Pappadio was shot and killed outside his home in Lido Beach, Long Island.

=== Michael Pappadio ===
Michael "Mike" Pappadio was a Bronx soldier who controlled the Garment district racket, after his brother Andimo Pappadio was murdered. Pappadio worked closely with family boss Anthony Corallo. In the 1970s, Pappadio joined his brother Andimo in controlling Ideal Trucking in the Garment district. In 1987, the family's new boss Vic Amuso and Anthony Casso suspected Pappadio of skimming 15 million a year from the shakedown and loan sharking rackets in the garment district. Amuso and Casso ordered Pappadio to be removed from the garment district racket and replaced him with Sidney Lieberman. Anthony Casso planned Pappadio's murder ordering brothers Carmine Avellino to bring Pappadio to Crown Bagels, a bakery on Rockaway Boulevard in the South Ozone Park, Queens. On May 13, 1989, Pappadio and Avellino arrived at the bakery, when Pappadio entered he was ambushed by Al D'Arco who smashed him over the head with copper cable and then George Zappola shot him in the head killing him. The murderers emptied Pappadio's pockets taking cash and an address book to be given to Casso before putting his body into a body bag. Government informant Al D'Arco suspected that Casso had arranged with Vic Orena Jr., son of the Colombo family acting boss, to use one of the Colombo family's-controlled funeral home for Pappadio's body.

=== Michael Perna ===
Michael J. Perna (1942 – October 28, 2020) was the acting capo of the New Jersey faction. Perna's father Joseph Perna was a mob bookmaker and shylock during the 1960s operating from Newark, New Jersey. His son Joseph R. "Big Joe" Perna followed him into the life and became a member of the Lucchese family's New Jersey faction. His younger brother Ralph V. Perna is also a member in the New Jersey faction. In the 1980s, Perna was a member of Michael Taccetta's inner circle and controlled operations from the Hole in the Wall, a luncheonette in Newark's Down Neck section. In August 1988, Perna was acquitted in the 21-month trial along with the other twenty members of the New Jersey faction. On April 18, 1991, Perna was charged in two separate indictments. The first indictment charged Perna, along with Michael Taccetta, Martin Taccetta, Anthony Accetturo and Tommy Ricciardi, with racketeering. The second indictment charged Perna, along with Michael Taccetta, Anthony Accetturo and Tommy Ricciardi, with corruption. On August 13, 1993, Perna was convicted in the first trial. In the second trial, both Thomas Ricciardi and Anthony Accetturo agreed to become Government witnesses; they testified against Perna and Taccetta. On September 20, 1993, Perna and Michael Taccetta pled guilty to federal racketeering. In the plea deal both Perna and Michael Taccetta admitted they bribed or tried to bribe jurors in the 1988 trial against 20 members of the Lucchese family and the 1991 trial of John Riggi, the boss of the DeCavalcante crime family. Perna and Michael Taccetta were sentenced to twenty-five years each. He was released from prison on July 31, 2015. Michael J. Perna died on October 28, 2020.

=== Joseph Pinzolo ===
Bonaventura "Joseph" Pinzolo (1887 – September 5, 1930), also known as "Fat Joe", was the boss of the family during 1930. In July 1908, Pinzolo was arrested for trying to bomb 314 East 11th Street in an effort to force owner Francisco Spinelli to pay Black Hand extortion demands. After his arrest Pinzolo gave up his boss Giuseppe Costabile, a Camorrista who controlled the area south of Houston Street to Canal Street and from East Broadway to the East River. Pinzolo served 2 years and 8 months to 5 years after refusing to testify against Costabile.

In February 1930, Gaetano Reina was murdered and boss Joseph Masseria backed Pinzolo to take control of the Reina family. Pinzolo may have been responsible for Reina's murder, although the most widely suspected culprit for that crime was Vito Genovese. As boss Pinzolo was unfamiliar with the members of the family and the East Harlem area. His promotion angered Tommaso Gagliano, Tommy Lucchese and Dominick Petrilli, who formed a splinter group within the family and planned his murder. On September 5, 1930, Pinzolo's body was found in the Brokaw building on 1487 Broadway in Suite 1007 occupied by California Dry Fruit Importers. The office was leased by Tommy Lucchese four months earlier. According to Joseph Valachi the killer was Girolamo "Bobby Doyle" Santucci. Valachi also mentioned that after Pinzolo's assassination a meeting was held on Staten Island to uncover who was responsible for the murder.

=== Stefano Rannelli ===
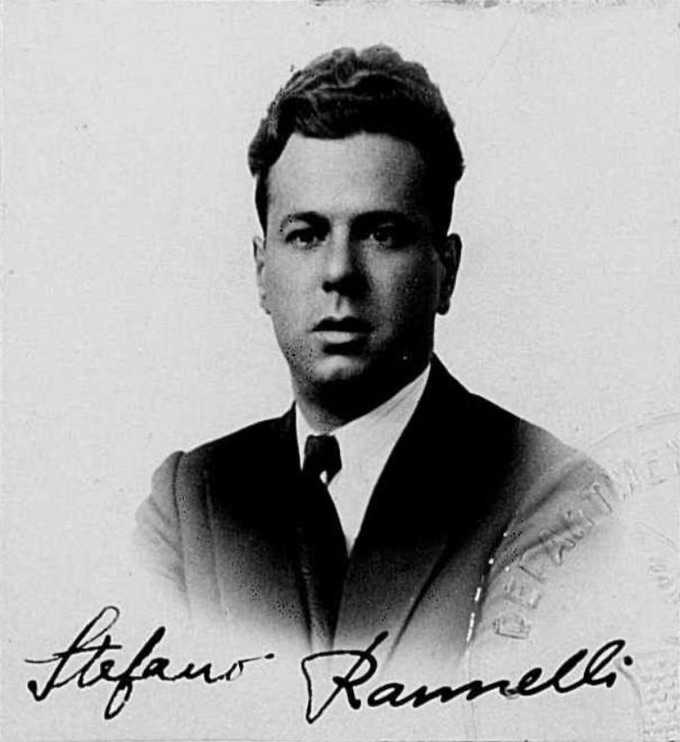
Stefano Rannelli

Stefano Salvatore "Steve" Rannelli (sometimes spelled Rondelli) (born in Palermo, Sicily – November 19, 1936) was an early member of Tom Reina's family in the Bronx. In 1922, Rannelli was arrested for a shooting several bystanders on August 8, after another gunman attempted to shoot Joe Masseria. In 1930, Reina was murdered, and boss of bosses Joe Masseria appointed his ally Joe Pinzolo as the new boss of the Reina family. Within the Reina family, Tommaso Gagliano formed a splinter group with Tommy Lucchese, Steve Rannelli, John DiCaro and others who opposed Pinzolo's leadership. On September 5, 1930, Joe Pinzolo was murdered by Girolomo "Bobby Doyle" Santuccio. All the members of the Reina family held a meeting on Staten Island to determine who murdered Pinzolo, but nothing came of that meeting because everyone remained silent. This allowed Tommaso Gagliano to become boss of the family.

After the Pinzolo murder, Rannelli began working with Salvatore Maranzano's Brooklyn Castellammarese clan. He learned the truth about the August 15, 1930, murder of Giuseppe Morello, the gunmen were Sebastiano Domingo and another unidentified man. During the Castellammarese War, Rannelli continued working with Maranzano until he failed to murder Paul Gambino, the brother of Carlo Gambino, a Masseria family member and was demoted by Maranzano. On November 19, 1936, Rannelli was murdered outside of 235 East 107th Street, a building that was owned by Vincent Rao. Government witness Joseph Valachi, revealed that Rannelli was murdered because he had plotted against Vito Genovese and Lucky Luciano.

=== Vincenzo Rao ===
Vincenzo "Vincent" John Rao (June 21, 1898, Palermo, Sicily – September 25, 1988), also known as Vincent or Vinny, was a former Consigliere in the family. His father was Antonio Rao and his mother Liboria Gagliano. He had a brother Calogero "Charles" and a sister Maria Speciale. On his mother's side, Rao was a distant relative to Tommaso Gagliano. He was a cousin to gangster Joseph Rao. He married Carmelina Alberti and the couple had two daughters, Nina Vento and Liboria Pancaldo. On December 5, 1921, Vincenzo Rao became a naturalized United States citizen in New York City.

He began his criminal career working for the Gaglianos in East Harlem. Rao became a powerful mobster in the lathing end of the lath and plaster industry. He became partners in Five Boro Hoisting Company, United Lathing Company, Westchester Lathing Corporation and Ace Lathing Company operating from the Bronx and Westchester. In the 1950s, boss Gaetano Lucchese promoted Rao to Consigliere in the family.

In 1957, Rao was arrested with 60 other mobsters at the abortive Apalachin meeting in rural Apalachin, New York. When asked by investigators why he was at the meeting, Rao said he went there for the luncheon buffet and did not speak to anyone else because he was not "introduced". During the 1963 Valachi hearings, Rao was listed as the Lucchese family's consigliere. In 1965, Rao was convicted on perjury charges and was sentenced to five years in prison. At the same time the longtime boss Thomas Lucchese had become ill and Rao was thought of as a suitable successor. His chance to become the new boss never came to fruition due to his trials. During the early 1970s, Rao retired. On September 25, 1988, Rao died of natural causes and is buried at Ferncliff Cemetery in Hartsdale, New York.

=== Michael Russo ===
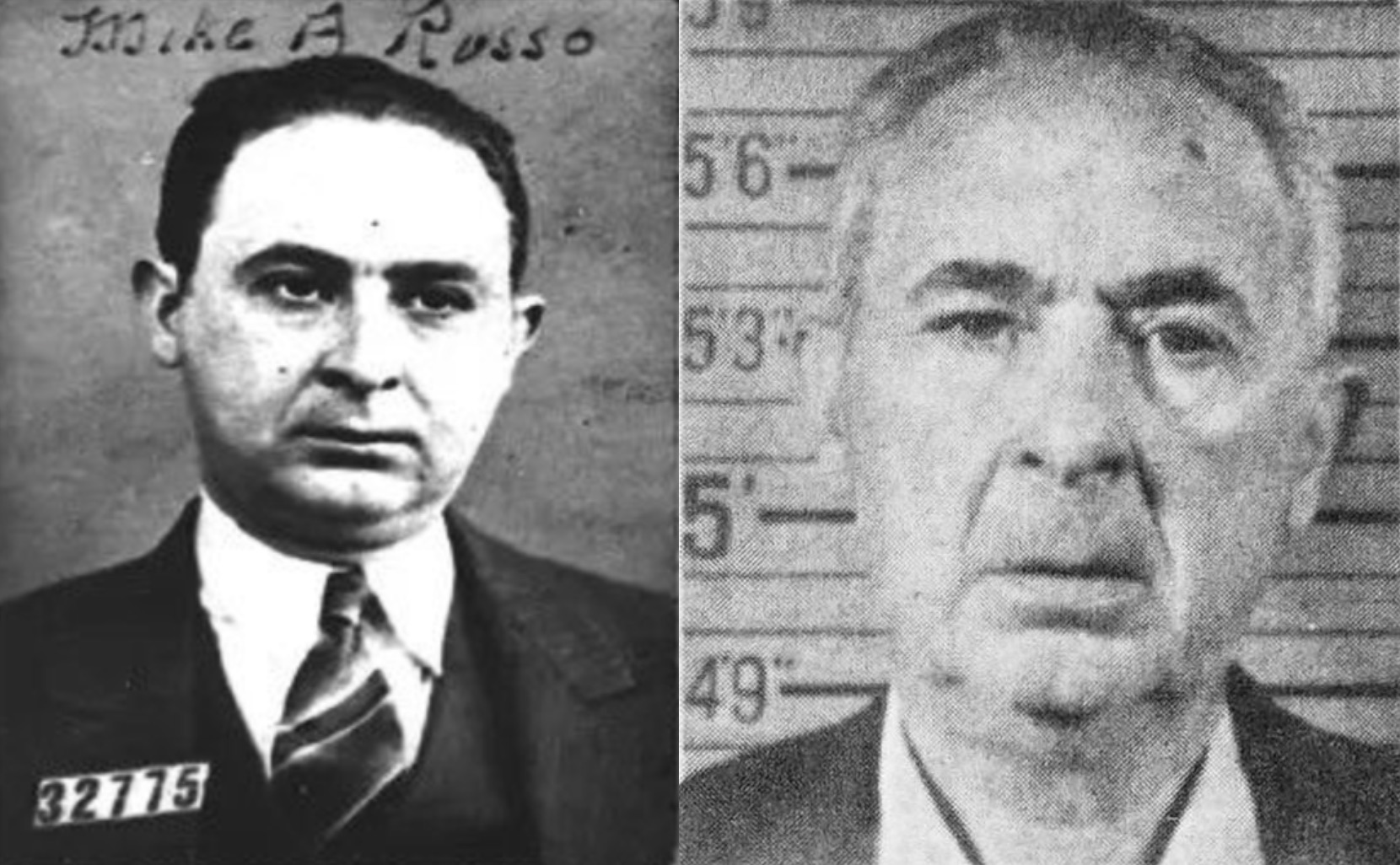
Mugshots of Michael Russo in 1928 and in later life

Michael "Mike Valentino" Russo (November 23, 1893 – March 1975) was a long-time soldier of the Lucchese crime family New Jersey faction. During his younger days, Michael Russo reportedly work as an "enforcer". In the early 1920s, Russo was inducted into the Newark family of Gaspare D'Amico, and during his time under this family, he attended the 1928 Cleveland Mafia meeting at the Hotel Statler as an official member. In 1933, he was one of the individuals arrested in New York City in connection with the murder of John Bazzano, who was the boss of the Pittsburgh crime family at the time. Russo was then living at 1202 Fifth Avenue, Pittsburgh. When the D'Amico family collapsed in 1937 with its rackets being divided up by the Commission, Michael Russo joined the Lucchese crime family, presumably to serve under Settimo Accardi.

In the early 1960s, when the FBN was compiling Mafia members, Russo, already in semi-retirement, was listed as living at 105 Ridgely Avenue, Iselin, New Jersey. His criminal record since 1911 consisted of: assault, burglary, swindling, homicide, embezzlement. Some of Michael Russo's other associates were: Vito Genovese, Joe Profaci, Joe Magliocco, Charles Tourine Sr., and former friends in the old Newark family: Andrew Lombardino and Emanuel Cammarata, by then both Colombo members. Other aliases of Russo listed by the FBN were: Mike Fedesco, Mike Partiro, Max Sender.

=== Frank Salerno ===
Frank "Skinny Frank" Salerno, also known as "Frankie", (died February 2023) was a former captain of a crew operating in Westchester and the Bronx. Salerno was a member of the "Bronx-Crea Crew", and took over the crew after Steven "Stevie Junior" Crea was imprisoned in May 2017. He is a nephew of former Lucchese captain Michael Salerno. In 1993, Frank Salerno was indicted along with others on federal charges of illegally dumping construction and demolition debris into landfills. In 2006, Salerno was charged with defrauding customers from his car dealership Ultimate Motors, Inc., by failing to forward proceeds of car sales to the owners of cars that it sold on consignment, selling vehicles that it did not own, and failing to deliver vehicles to purchasers after receiving payment for car sales. In April 2012, Frank Salerno went to the Tuckahoe police station to help his son Adam Salerno who was arrested for driving with a suspended license, before leaving the police arrested Frank with a warrant from Atlantic County, N.J. for passing bad checks. In May 2020, Salerno was identified in an FBI surveillance photo meeting with Lucchese members acting boss Mike DeSantis, consigliere Andrew DeSimone, soldier Anthony Villani, soldier Anthony Baratta and caporegime George Zappola in Jefferson Park. Salerno died in February 2023.

=== Salvatore Santoro ===
Salvatore T. "Tom Mix" Santoro Sr. (November 18, 1915 – January 2000) served as underboss in the Lucchese crime family during the 1980s before being convicted in the Mafia Commission Trial and sentenced to 100 years in federal prison.

He was born in Leonia, New Jersey, to Antonio and Teresa Bargio. He married Mary Zangaglia but did not father any children. He is the uncle to Lucchese family soldier and union boss Anthony DiLapi. He acquired the nickname "Tom Mix" because in his younger years he closely resembled the Dutch-German-American western film actor by that name.

Santoro started working for the Gagliano crime family, forerunner of the Lucchese family, in the early 1930s. He served as an associate of future boss Tommy "Three-Finger Brown" Lucchese's 107th Street gang in operating extortion, loansharking, narcotics and prostitution rings during the 1930s. He was made sometime in the 1940s operating drug trafficking and loansharking rings.

On July 6, 1942, Santoro received six months to two years in prison after pleading guilty to conspiring to import narcotics from Mexico.

In March 1951, Santoro was indicted on charges of conspiracy to import opium from Mexico and convert it into heroin. Santoro went into hiding and allegedly spent time in Europe before returning to Oyster Bay, New York. On September 24, 1951, he surrendered to federal authorities in New York City. On January 7, 1952, after pleading guilty to narcotics charges, a judge labeled Santoro as a "bad fellow" and sentenced him to four years in prison.

In 1951 or 1953, longtime boss Tommy Gagliano died. Underboss Tommy Lucchese took over what was now called the Lucchese crime family. Lucchese then promoted Santoro to capo of the family's powerful Bronx faction.

As capo Santoro was based in East Harlem and the Bronx, controlling large heroin drug trafficking operations during the 1950s. In 1958 he was arrested and tried for narcotics charges. He was alleged to be a partner and associate of Bumpy Johnson, although this never was confirmed. Santoro was convicted of all charges in 1959 and was given a twenty-year prison sentence.

When Santoro was released from prison in 1978 he took over as underboss, continuing to oversee the powerful Bronx faction of the family. He left the drug trade alone and instead took over the labor and construction racketeering operations for the family in New York City. Santoro gained a reputation as a labor racketeer and worked with consigliere Christopher Furnari and other top capos in the family. He bought a home on City Island Avenue in City Island, Bronx.

In the early 1980s, Anthony Corallo found a new way to discuss business without ever meeting his top underlings Santoro and Furnari. Corallo used his Jaguar with a phone inside and talked to mostly Santoro on the phone while he was driving around in New York with his chauffeur Aniello Migliore. This succeeded mostly because the noise of the old Jaguar was so loud that it was not possible to hear what Corallo and others were saying. However, after the Jaguar came with a new engine and new filter, Federal Bureau of Investigation agents planted a bug in it, and listened in to Corallo's conversations with Santoro, mostly about the profit from the labor and construction racketeering operations in the Bronx, where they extorted unions and had influence in the construction industry.

As U.S. law enforcement undertook a concerted effort to crush organized crime activities in New York City during the mid-1980s, they put eleven top members of the Five Families, including the entire leadership of the Lucchese crime family, Corallo, Santoro and consigliere Christopher "Christie Tick" Furnari, on trial, called the Mafia Commission Trial or the Commission Case. The defendants were arrested on February 25, 1985, on various charges, including labor racketeering, extortion, loansharking, illegal gambling and murder.

The trial began in September 1986. The charges also involved the execution of Bonanno crime family de facto boss Carmine Galante in 1979, allegedly on the orders of the Commission because they saw Galante as a potential rival who planned to take over all organized crime operations in the New York area.

On November 19, 1986, Santoro and the other defendants were convicted on all counts. On January 13, 1987, Santoro was sentenced to 100 years in prison and fined $250,000.

In January 2000, Santoro died at age 87 of natural causes at a medical center for federal prisoners. Corallo died months later in August 2000.

=== Patrick Testa ===
Patrick Louis "Patty" Testa (March 11, 1957 – December 2, 1992) was a soldier. Testa was the younger brother to Joseph Testa.

In 1984, he was indicted on fraud and theft charges, along with members of the Gambino family's DeMeo crew. Testa was sentenced to two years in prison and after his release joined the Lucchese crime family.

On December 2, 1992, Testa was murdered, shot in the back of the head nine times. It was later revealed that Anthony Casso had ordered Frank Lastorino to murder Testa.

=== Anthony Tortorello ===
Anthony "Torty" Tortorello was a former capo of the "Prince Street crew". In 1986, Tortorello was overheard by Genovese mobsters asking why Vincent Gigante was upset by drug deals when Gigante himself profited from drug deals. When Gigante heard these statements he demanded Tortorello's death, but Anthony Casso was able to save his life by planning a phony beating of Tortorello to appease Gigante's demand.

In October 1991, Tortorello, along with Frank Lastorino, Anthony Baratta, Salvatore Avellino, Richard Pagliarulo, George Conte, Thomas Anzellotto and Frank Papagni, inducted (made) Joseph Tortorello, Thomas D'Ambrosia, Frank Gioia Jr., Gregory Cappello and Jody Calabrese into the crime family during a ceremony that was held in a Howard Beach, Queens home. Tortorello sponsored his son Joseph "Torty Jr." during the ceremony. His son Joseph "Torty Jr." later went on to control a drug operation in lower Manhattan.

In 1996, Tortorello was arrested and charged with the murder and robbery of a Manhattan designer; he later took a plea deal and was sentenced to ten years in prison. In late 2000, Tortorello died in a Kentucky prison.

=== Dominic Truscello ===
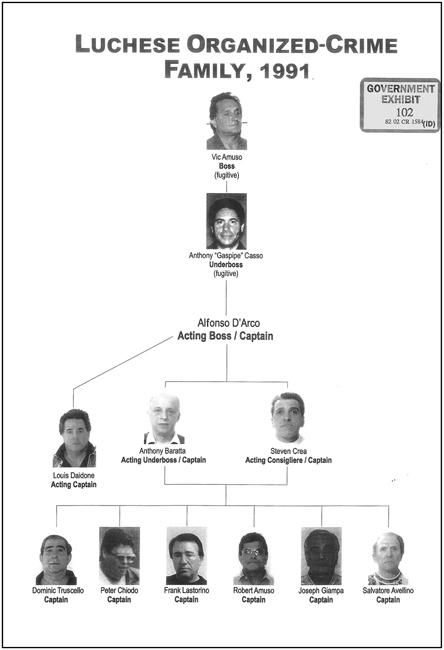
Truscello listed as capo in 1991

Dominic "Crazy Dom" Truscello (April 29, 1934 – July 2018) was the capo of the "Prince Street Crew". In the 1990s, Truscello, along with Steven Crea and Joseph Tangorra, formed the "Lucchese Construction Group", supervising all the Lucchese family's construction-related rackets. On September 6, 2000, Truscello was indicted, along with acting boss Steven Crea, capo Joseph Tangorra, soldiers Joseph Datello, Philip DeSimone, Arthur Zambardi, Anthony Pezzullo and Joseph Truncale, on labor racketeering, extortion and bid-rigging charges. In September 2002, Truscello and Steven Crea were indicted on information supplied by Joseph DeFede, who became a government witness in February. The indictment charged Truscello with extorting "Commercial Brick", a construction company. In October 2003, Truscello pled guilty to federal extortion charges. On January 9, 2006, Truscello was released from prison. On May 31, 2017, Truscello, along with Street Boss Matthew Madonna, Underboss Steven Crea Sr., Consigliere Joseph DiNapoli and other members of the family, were indicted and charged with racketeering, murder, narcotics (cocaine, heroin, marijuana, prescribed medication) and firearms offenses. Truscello died during the trial in July 2018.

=== Angelo Urgitano ===
Angelo "Cheesecake" Urgitano was a former capo of the "Harlem crew". His father Tommy Urgitano received the nickname "Cheesecake". While walking in Pleasant Avenue, he called up to a girl looking out a window and asked her for money to buy a cheesecake. Urgitano was raised between Pleasant Avenue and 114th Street, keeping his father's nickname "Cheesecake" and eventually became a made member in the Lucchese family. Urgitano became a powerful mobster operating from Pleasant Avenue and eventually became the caporegime of the Harlem crew. In the late 1990s, Michael Blutrich, the owner of Scores (a strip club franchise) became a government informant and identified Urgitano as a caporegime in the Lucchese family. His son Joseph "Joey Cupcakes" Urgitano was arrested for murder of a Colombo family associate.

== Past associate(s) ==
=== Michael DiCarlo ===
Michael "Mikey Muscles" DiCarlo (died May 16, 1978) was an associate from Bensonhurst, Brooklyn. A small-time associate of an unidentified Lucchese family caporegime in Brooklyn, DiCarlo was also named as a gay pimp in "The Rothstein Files", documents on the sex industry in Manhattan compiled by former New York City Police Department (NYPD) vice squad detective Jim Rothstein in the 1970s. A champion bodybuilder, he owned a gym in Mill Basin where he trained local young men and boys.

DiCarlo was ordered killed by his capo after molesting a boy whose family had connections to the Luccheses, and the murder contract was given to Gambino family soldier Roy DeMeo. On May 16, 1978, DiCarlo was shot, stabbed and beaten to death with a hammer, and also sodomized with a broomstick, before being dismembered by DeMeo, Henry Borelli, Edward Grillo, Joseph Guglielmo, Chris Rosenberg, Anthony Senter and Joseph Testa at an afterhours club in Flatlands which was briefly operated by the DeMeo crew. His remains were disposed of in the Fountain Avenue landfill.

An associate of DiCarlo from Canarsie, Scott Cafaro, was also murdered by the DeMeo crew in February or March 1979 when the crew was hired by a rape victim's father to kill Cafaro, who had been acquitted of the rape in court.

=== Abraham Telvi ===
Abraham "Abe" Telvi (September 12, 1934 – July 28, 1956) was an associate of Johnny Dio. In 1956, Telvi was ordered by Dio to throw acid on New York journalist Victor Riesel for making radio and television broadcasts about labor union corruption. In the morning of April 5, 1956, Telvi attacked Victor Riesel as he was leaving Lindy's, a Broadway restaurant, throwing sulfuric acid onto his face, leaving him permanently blind. In the attack, Telvi had burned himself badly on the right side of his face and neck with some of the acid that splashed on him. He was paid $1,175 in cash and began demanding more money from Dio. On July 28, 1956, Telvi was found dead on Mulberry Street with a bullet in his head.

=== Vincent Zito ===
Vincent Zito (December 18, 1940 – October 26, 2018) was a former associate of the Lucchese family. Zito had a criminal record and had been arrested in the past for loan sharking. His elder brother Anthony Zito, who had been arrested in 1971 for extortion, was also linked to the Lucchese family. On October 26, 2018, Zito was found murdered in his Sheepshead Bay, Brooklyn home, after being shot twice in the head. On March 7, 2019, Anthony Pandrella, a Gambino family associate, was indicted for murdering Zito. The indictment claimed Anthony Pandrella a longtime friend of Zito murdered him and stole his loan sharking business.

== Government informants and witnesses ==
=== Peter Chiodo ===
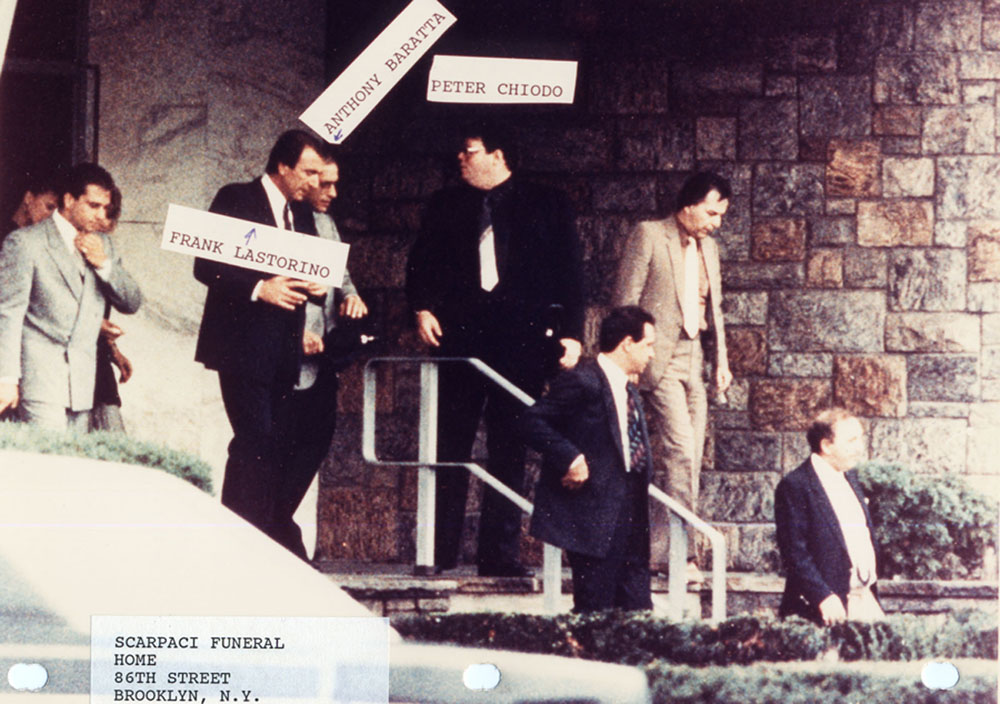
FBI surveillance photograph of Chiodo, Lastorino and Baratta

Peter "Fat Pete" Chiodo (1951–2016), was a caporegime in the Lucchese family before becoming a government witness.

In 1987, Chiodo became a made man in the Lucchese family in a ceremony held in an apartment over a funeral home in Queens. In 1989, Chiodo became a caporegime in charge of funneling payoffs from Local 580 of the Ironworkers' Union to the Lucchese leadership. He was known as "Fat Pete" because of his enormous girth—400 lb (180 kg) to 500 lb (230 kg), depending on the source.

In 1989, the Lucchese family began worrying about indictments from the Windows case. The Luccheses and three other New York families had participated in a window replacement scheme that stole millions of dollars from the New York City Housing Authority (NYCHA). Worried that construction union leader John Morrissey might testify for the prosecution, family leaders ordered Chiodo to lure Morrissey to New Jersey, where he was murdered.

In 1991, Chiodo was charged with violations of the Racketeer Influenced and Corrupt Organizations Act (RICO) in the Windows case. Chiodo realized that the government's case was so solid that he would likely die in prison if convicted. He decided to plead guilty in return for a lighter sentence.

However, Chiodo did not ask Lucchese official boss Vittorio "Vic" Amuso and official underboss Anthony "Gaspipe" Casso for permission to take a plea. Amuso and Casso were both in hiding due to the Windows case. Suspecting Chiodo was about to turn informer, Amuso and Casso ordered him killed. Casso gave the contract to acting boss Alphonse 'Little Al' D'Arco. The order shocked D'Arco, who knew that Chiodo had been a close confidant of Casso for years.

On May 8, 1991, two shooters ambushed Chiodo at a gas station in Staten Island, where he was working on a car. Chiodo received 12 bullet wounds in the arms, legs and torso, but survived the attack. Doctors credited Chiodo's massive girth for saving his life; none of the slugs penetrated a vital organ or artery. However, he suffered several abdominal wounds and a disabled right arm.

Chiodo had anticipated that he was in Amuso and Casso's bad books; he knew that Amuso and Casso had a habit of "marking guys rats and killing them". Just before the hit, he told D'Arco that he'd gotten word that "you and I are going to be killed and hurt".

Following the unsuccessful assassination attempt, Lucchese mobsters delivered a blunt threat to Chiodo's lawyer that they would kill Chiodo's wife if he testified, a violation of a longstanding Mafia rule against harming women. While Chiodo had turned down several offers to flip, the threat against his wife was the last straw. He opted to break his blood oath and become a government witness, by his own account, to protect his family. The government quickly brought Chiodo's immediate family into the federal Witness Protection Program.

With the failure of his gunmen to murder Chiodo, D'Arco soon became afraid of the wrath of his bosses. After a 1991 meeting during which he feared being murdered, D'Arco went into hiding and soon became a government witness himself.

In September 1991, using a wheelchair due to his wounds, Chiodo testified in the Windows trial. Chiodo stated that he had undergone a "transformation" from a violent criminal to a man with a conscience. When asked what prompted this transformation, Chiodo replied "I was shot 12 times".

Chiodo's remaining family in Brooklyn soon suffered retaliation from the Luccheses. On March 10, 1992, Lucchese associate Michael Spinelli shot Patricia Capozallo, Chiodo's sister, while she was driving in Bensonhurst. Capozallo suffered wounds to the arm, back and neck but survived. On February 2, 1993, the body of Frank Signorino, Chiodo's uncle, was found in the trunk of a car in East New York. The body displayed several gunshot wounds to the head.

Chiodo provided valuable evidence that helped convict both Amuso and Casso as well as many other gangsters. While testifying in different cities, the government had to fly Chiodo in a special plane due to his morbid obesity. In July 1997, Chiodo testified against Genovese crime family boss Vincent Gigante in another Windows-related racketeering trial.

On September 11, 2007, Chiodo was sentenced to 17 years in prison on racketeering charges. However, due to his testimony, Chiodo was to serve no time in prison and was placed in the Witness Protection Program. Peter Chiodo died in January 2016, aged 65, of natural causes.

=== Joseph D'Arco ===
Joseph "Little Joe" D'Arco is a former soldier who is currently in witness protection, as had his father, former acting boss Alphonse D'Arco, until his death. In early 1990, Vic Amuso and Anthony Casso ordered D'Arco to kill Anthony DiLapi, a soldier who was in hiding. On February 4, 1990, he shot DiLapi to death in his Hollywood, California, apartment building's underground garage. In September 1991, D'Arco's father became a marked man (being targeted for death) and, fearing for his own life, surrendered to the F.B.I. and agreed to become a witness.

=== Joseph DeFede ===
Joseph "Little Joe" DeFede (1934 – July 15, 2012) was a former New York City mobster and acting boss of the Lucchese crime family who eventually turned informant. Born in 1934, DeFede grew up in the Queens borough of New York City. In his early days, he operated a hot dog vendor truck in Coney Island, Brooklyn, running numbers rackets on the side. A close friend and handball partner of Lucchese leader Vittorio "Vic" Amuso, once Amuso became boss DeFede was inducted into the family either in 1989 or 1990.

DeFede's rise and fall in the New York mob can all be attributed to Amuso. In 1994, Amuso was convicted of federal racketeering and murder charges and sent to prison for life. In 1995, Amuso named DeFede his acting boss after the imprisonment of the then ruling panel but to also appoint a weaker and more controllable man at the top.

On April 28, 1998, DeFede was indicted on nine counts of racketeering stemming from his supervision of the family rackets in New York's Garment District from 1991 to 1996. The prosecution claimed that the Lucchese family had been grossing $40,000 per month from Garment District businesses since the mid-1980s. In December 1998, DeFede pled guilty to the charges and received five years in prison.

During the late '90s, Amuso's relationship with DeFede began to sour. After DeFede's 1998 imprisonment, Amuso appointed Steven Crea acting boss, the head of the family's powerful Bronx faction. After Crea became acting boss the profits rose considerably making Amuso suspicious that DeFede was skimming profits and that was enough to convince Amuso that DeFede must have, so Amuso reportedly decided to have him murdered.

On February 5, 2002, DeFede was released from a Lexington, Kentucky, prison medical center. Having heard of Amuso's plans to kill him, DeFede immediately became a government informant. DeFede provided details concerning the Garment District rackets and the protection rackets in Howard Beach, Queens. He also provided information leading to the convictions of Crea, Louis Daidone, Dominic Truscello, Joseph Tangorra, Anthony Baratta, and a number of family captains, soldiers and associates. While testifying against Gambino crime family boss Peter Gotti, DeFede testified that he only earned $1,014,000, or approximately $250,000 per year, during his tenure as acting boss. DeFede also estimated that a low ranking family soldier would make on average $50,000 per year.

DeFede entered and left the Witness Protection Program, moving to live in Florida under an assumed name. He and his wife reportedly lived on $30,000 a year and a modest annuity provided by the U.S. Marshals Service, their assets having been depleted by legal bills and the cost of creating new identities. On July 15, 2012, DeFede died from a heart attack.

=== Donald Frankos ===
Donald "Tony the Greek" George Frankos, (born November 10, 1938 Hackensack, New Jersey – died March 30, 2011 Dannemora, New York), was a Greek-Italian contract killer and mob associate of the Lucchese family, who later became a government witness. His father George Argiri Frango left his home town of Kardamyla on Chios, Greece in 1905 as a crewman on a ship. George Frango married Irene, an immigrant from Syracuse, Italy and had three children: Georgia (1932), James (1935) and Donald (1938). In 1974, Frankos murdered Lucchese associate Richard Bilello.

In 1992, Frankos falsely claimed to author William Hoffman he took part in the murder of Jimmy Hoffa, with a hit team consisting of him and Irish-American mobsters John Sullivan and James Coonan. According to Frankos's story, Hoffa was lured by his close friend Chuckie O'Brien to a house owned by Detroit mobster Anthony Giacolone. Once there, Hoffa was shot and killed by Coonan and Frankos using suppressed .22 pistols. Hoffa was then dismembered by Coonan, Sullivan and Frankos. It has been asserted that he sealed the body in an oil drum and buried it underneath Giants Stadium; however, no evidence has ever been found to substantiate this claim. Author Jerry Capeci found these claims false because Frankos was in prison during Hoffa's disappearance.

=== Eugenio Giannini ===
Eugenio Giannini a former soldier who became an informant to the Bureau of Narcotics. In 1942, Giannini was charged with heroin conspiracy and served fifteen months in prison. He moved to Europe in 1950, and began smuggling U.S. medical supplies into Italy. While in Italy he formed a connection to Charles Luciano and began informing on Luciano to the Bureau of Narcotics. Giannini was arrested on counterfeiting charges in Italy but the charges were dropped and he moved back to New York.

The Mafia in New York discovered that Giannini was an informer and ordered his murder. Genovese family capo Anthony "Tony Bender" Strollo gave the contract to Joseph Valachi. On September 20, 1952, Giannini's body was found on 107th Street shot to death. Valachi later revealed he recruited brothers Joseph and Pasquale Pagano and Fiore Siano to carry out the hit. They murdered Giannini near a gambling club run by Lucchese family soldier Paul Correale between Second Avenue and East 112th Street.

=== Frank Gioia Jr. ===
Frank "Spaghetti Man" Gioia Jr. (born August 10, 1967) is a former soldier who is currently in witness protection along with his father, former soldier Frank Gioia Sr. In 1991, Gioia Jr. was inducted into the Lucchese crime family in a ceremony held in Howard Beach, Queens. He was sponsored by George Conte, who was filling in for his real sponsor George Zappola. In June 1992, Gioia Jr. was arrested in Brooklyn on a gun charge. In 1993, Gioia Jr., along with George Zappola and Frank Papagni, plotted to have Steven Crea killed. In 1993, Gioia was arrested for trafficking heroin from Manhattan to Boston.

In 1994, Gioia found out that Frank Papagni planned to murder his father Frank Gioia Sr., prompting the son to become a government witness. After becoming a government witness, Gioia Jr. had testified against 60 defendants. Federal Prosecutor's credit Gioia Jr. with providing information and testimony against at least 70 mobsters in the Lucchese and Genovese crime families.

According to investigator Robert Anglen, a Phoenix, Arizona real estate developer, the individual known as Frank Capri is really former mob informant Frank Gioia Jr. Since 2015, Capri and his company have been accused in multiple lawsuits for failing to pay rent and contractors and misappropriating funds meant to pay for construction.

On February 5, 2020, Frank Capri and his mother Debbie Corvo were indicted on charges of wire fraud and conspiracy to commit money laundering in connection with the operation of various branded restaurant locations in Arizona and across the United States. The indictment charged Capri with the financial failure of Toby Keith and Rascal Flatts branded restaurants.

=== Burton Kaplan ===
Burton Kaplan was an associate and government informant. During the 1980s Kaplan was the go-between for Lucchese crime family underboss Anthony Casso and NYPD Detectives Louis Eppolito and Stephen Caracappa. In 2006, Kaplan was released from federal custody and his remaining 18-year sentence for marijuana trafficking was dropped in return for cooperating in the case against Eppolito and Caracappa. In July 2009, Kaplan died from prostate cancer.

=== John Pennisi ===
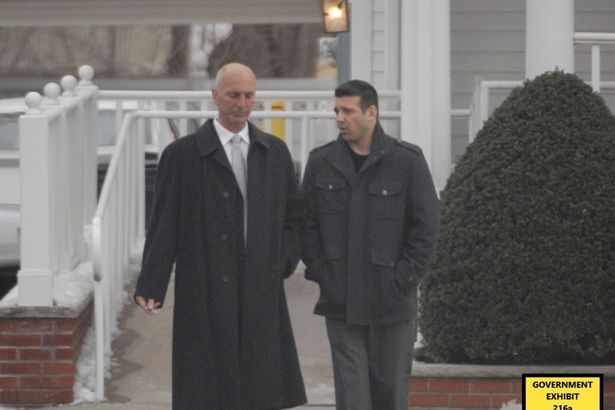
FBI Surveillance photo of John Pennisi (right) and Anthony Guzzo (left)

John Pennisi is a former soldier who is currently in witness protection. On April 2, 2013, Pennisi was made into the Lucchese family in a secret initiation ceremony in a basement of a Staten Island home by acting boss Matthew Madonna and capo John Castellucci. Pennisi was a member of the Lucchese family's Brooklyn faction that operated from Tottenville, Staten Island. In October 2018, Pennisi started cooperating with the FBI. In May 2019, Pennisi testified as a government witness in the trial against Eugene Castelle and revealed the current leadership of the Lucchese family. Pennisi testified that in 2017, the Brooklyn faction of the family wrote a letter to imprisoned boss Victor Amuso complaining about how the power had shifted to the Bronx.

According to Pennisi's testimony, Amuso sent a letter to Underboss Steven Crea which stated that Brooklyn based mobster Michael "Big Mike" DeSantis would take over as acting boss replacing the Bronx-based Matthew Madonna. The testimony from Pennisi stated that if the Bronx faction refused to step aside, imprisoned boss Amuso had approved of a hit list that included a captain and several members of the Bronx faction. During Pennisi's testimony, he revealed that the Lucchese family operates with a total of seven crews – two in The Bronx, two on Long Island, one in Manhattan, one in New Jersey and one in Brooklyn/Staten Island. He had launched a podcast with Tom La Vecchia (New Theory Podcast) as they formed the MBA and Button Man. After the show disbanded, he launched Sitdown News YouTube channel.

=== Dominick Petrilli ===
Dominick "The Gap" Petrilli was a former member. He got the nickname "The Gap" after losing two front teeth in a childhood fight. Petrilli met Joseph Valachi in Sing Sing prison in Ossining, New York. In 1928, after Valachi was released from prison Petrilli introduced him to Girolama "Bobby Doyle" Santucci and Tom Gagliano. In 1942, Petrilli was convicted on narcotic charges and was deported to Italy. In November 1953, he reentered the U.S. and it was rumored he was working with the government. On December 9, 1953, he was murdered in a bar on East 183rd Street in the Bronx by three gunmen.

=== Thomas Ricciardi ===
Thomas "Tommy Boy" Ricciardi is a former soldier who is currently in witness protection. Both Thomas and his brother Daniel were associated with the Lucchese family's New Jersey faction before becoming government informants. Ricciardi was a member of Michael Taccetta's inner circle and controlled the group's illegal gambling operations. In August 1988, Ricciardi, along with his brother Daniel and twenty other members of the New Jersey faction, were acquitted in a 21-month trial. On April 18, 1991, Ricciardi was indicted, along with Michael Taccetta, Anthony Accetturo and Michael Perna, on corruption charges. On August 13, 1993, they were all convicted of racketeering and both Thomas Ricciardi and Anthony Accetturo agreed to become government witnesses and testified against Taccetta and Perna. On September 6, 2001, Ricciardi was released from prison after serving 10 years, and is now currently in the witness protection program.

=== Vincent Salanardi ===
Vincent "Vinny Baldy" Salanardi is a former soldier of the Vario crew who became a government informant. In 2002, Salanardi was indicted along with consigliere Joseph Caridi, acting capo John "Johnny Sideburns" Cerrella and others. Salanardi reported to Cerrella and assisted in extorting the Hudson & McCoy Fish House restaurant in Freeport, Long Island. He began cooperating with the government, and continued to collect money from a loanshark debt and was dropped from the witness protection program. In March 2006, Salanardi was sentenced to 11 years and three months in prison. Salanardi was released from prison on October 29, 2012.

=== Frank Suppa ===
Frank "Goo Goo" Suppa is a former soldier who is currently in witness protection. Suppa was a soldier in the Lucchese family's New Jersey faction operating in Florida as Anthony Accetturo's right-hand man. In 1983, Suppa attended a sitdown along with Anthony Accetturo, Michael Taccetta, Thomas Ricciardi and Philadelphia crime family mobsters Jackie "the Nose" DiNorscio and Joseph Alonzo over DiNorscio joining the Lucchese family. In 1993, Suppa was indicted along with others on charges that they conspired to distribute up to 1,650 pounds (750 kg) of cocaine in the United States. In December 1996, Suppa, along with his son Anthony Suppa, Joseph Marino, David Deatherage and Steven Cassone, testified against Fabio Dicristifaro and Irving Schwartz in the case of the murder of Joseph Martino. In 1997, Dicristifaro and Schwartz received life sentences, based on the testimony of Suppa and other witnesses.

== Bibliography ==
- Abrams, Floyd. Speaking Freely: Trials of the First Amendment. Penguin, 2006. ISBN 9780143036753
- Capeci, Jerry. The Complete Idiot's Guide to the Mafia. Penguin, 2005. ISBN 1592573053
- Capeci, Jerry. Jerry Capeci's Gang Land. Penguin, 2003. ISBN 9781592571338
- Capeci, Jerry and Robbins, Tom. Mob Boss: The Life of Little Al D'Arco, the Man Who Brought Down the Mafia. Macmillan, 2013. ISBN 1250006864.
- Carlo, Philip (2008). Gaspipe: Confessions of a Mafia Boss. New York: HarperCollins. ISBN 978-0061429842.
- Critchley, David. The origin of organized crime in America: the New York City mafia, 1891–1931. Routledge Publishing, 2009. ISBN 0415990300.
- DeStefano, Anthony. King of the Godfathers: "Big Joey" Massino and the Fall of the Bonanno Crime Family. Pinnacle Books, 2007. ISBN 978-0-7860-1893-2
- DeVico, Peter J. The Mafia Made Easy: The Anatomy and Culture of La Cosa Nostra. Tate Publishing, 2007. ISBN 1602472548.
- Fitch, Robert. Solidarity For Sale: How Corruption Destroyed the Labor Movement and Undermined America's Promise. New York: PublicAffairs, 2006. ISBN 1-891620-72-X
- Friedman, Robert I. (2000). Red Mafiya: How the Russian Mob has Invaded America.
- Gallo, Kenny and Randazzo, Matthew. Breakshot: A Life in the 21st Century American Mafia Simon and Schuster, 2009. ISBN 9781439195833
- Garcia, Joaquin and Michael Levin. Making Jack Falcone: An Undercover FBI Agent Takes Down a Mafia Family. New York: Simon & Schuster, 2009. ISBN 1439149917.
- Goldstock, Ronald. New York (State). Organized Crime Task Force, New York State Organized Crime Task Force. Corruption and Racketeering in the New York City Construction Industry: Final Report to Governor Mario M. Cuomo. NYU Press, 1991. ISBN 0814730345
- Haugen, David M. Is the Mafia Still a Force in America?. Greenhaven Press, Mar 10, 2006 – Juvenile Nonfiction. ISBN 0737724021
- Hoffman, William and Headley, Lake. Contract Killer: The Explosive Story of the Mafia's Most Notorious Hitman Donald "Tony the Greek" Frankos. Pinnacle Books, 1994. ISBN 1558177884
- Jacobs, James. Friel, Coleen and Raddick, Robert. Gotham Unbound: How New York City Was Liberated From the Grip of Organized Crime. NYU Press, 2001. ISBN 0814742475
- Jenkins, John A. The litigators: inside the powerful world of America's high-stakes trial lawyers Doubleday, 1989. ISBN 9780385244084
- Justice, Commerce, the Judiciary, and Related Agencies Appropriations United States. Congress. House. Committee on appropriations. Subcommittee on Departments of State. Departments of State, Justice, and Commerce, the Judiciary, and Related Agencies Appropriations For Fiscal Year. 1979.
- Kelly, Robert J. The Upperworld and the Underworld: Case Studies of Racketeering and Business. Springer Science & Business Media, Dec 6, 2012. ISBN 1461548837
- Kerr, Gordon and Welch, Claire and Welch, Ian. Rats and Squealers: Dishing the dirt to save their skins. Hachette Group, 2008. ISBN 0708804942
- Kroger, John. Convictions: A Prosecutor's Battles Against Mafia Killers, Drug Kingpins, and Enron Thieves. Macmillan, 2009. ISBN 0374531773
- Lawson, Guy and Oldham, William. The Brotherhoods: The True Story of Two Cops Who Murdered for the Mafia. Simon and Schuster, 2006. ISBN 9780743289443
- Liddick, Don. The mob's daily number: organized crime and the numbers gambling industry. Publisher University Press of America, 1999. ISBN 0761812660
- Maas, Peter. The Valachi Papers. HarperCollins, 2003. ISBN 9780060507428
- Milhorn, H. Thomas. Crime: Computer Viruses to Twin Towers. Boca Raton, Florida: Universal Publishers, 2005. ISBN 1-58112-489-9
- Newton, Michael. The Mafia at Apalachin, 1957. McFarland, 2012. ISBN 0786489863
- Pileggi, Nicholas. Wiseguy: Life In A Mafia Family. Simon & Schuster, 1990. ISBN 0671723227
- Raab, Selwyn. Five Families: The Rise, Decline, and Resurgence of America's Most Powerful Mafia Empires. New York: St. Martin Press, 2005. ISBN 0-312-30094-8
- Reavill, Gil. Mafia Summit: J. Edgar Hoover, the Kennedy Brothers, and the Meeting That Unmasked the Mob. Macmillan, 2013. ISBN 1250021103
- Report of the New York State Joint Legislative Committee on Crime, Its Causes, Control & Effect on Society. Issue 26 of Legislative document – State of New York Legislative document. The Committee, 1971. Report of the New York State Joint Legislative Committee on Crime, Its ... - New York (State). Legislature. Joint Legislative Committee on Crime, Its Causes, Control and Effect on Society - Google Books
- Rudolph, Robert C. The Boys from New Jersey: How the Mob Beat the Feds. New York: William Morrow and Company Inc., 1992. ISBN 0-8135-2154-8
- Sifakis, Carl. The Mafia Encyclopedia. Infobase Publishing, 2005. ISBN 0816069891
- United States Senate, One Hundredth Congress. Organized crime: 25 years after Valachi : hearings before the Permanent Subcommittee on Investigations of the Committee on Governmental Affairs, United States Senate, One Hundredth Congress, second session, April 11, 15, 21, 22, 29, 1988 U.S. G.P.O., 1988.
- United States Treasury Department, Bureau of Narcotics, foreword by Sam Giancana. Mafia: The Government's Secret File on Organized Crime. HarperCollins, 2009. ISBN 0061363855.
- Volkman, Ernest. Gangbusters: The Destruction of America's Last Mafia Dynasty. Faber & Faber, 1998. ISBN 0380732351

=== Newspaper articles ===
- The New York Times: Ex-Crime Boss Testifies In Gotti Trial by William Glaberson
- The New York Times: Former Crime Boss Testifies by Benjamin Weiser
- The New York Times: Guilty Plea In Mafia Case by Benjamin Weiser
- The New York Times: Reputed Crime Boss Enters a Guilty Plea
- The New York Times: After Mob, Joe DeFede, Ex-Crime Boss, Is Scraping By
- Gearty, Robert (October 30, 2002). "Little Joe Sings About Shakedowns". New York Daily News.
- "Mob informants "Peter "Fat Pete" Chiodo"". New York Daily News. Archived from the original on June 10, 2009.
- Associated Press Sketches of 9 Arrested, an Associated Press article
- Magnuson, Ed (June 24, 2001). "Hitting the Mafia". Time. Archived from the original on December 6, 2002.
