= Anthony Casso =

American mobster (1942–2020)

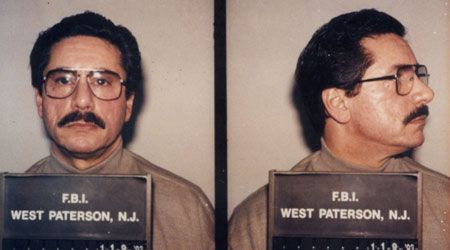
- 1993 FBI mugshot of Casso
- Born: Anthony Salvatore Casso; May 21, 1942; New York City, New York, U.S.
- Died: December 15, 2020 (aged 78); Tucson, Arizona, U.S.
- Other name: Gaspipe
- Occupation: Mobster
- Spouse: Lillian Delduca (m. 1968; died 2005)
- Children: 2
- Status: Deceased
- Allegiance: Lucchese crime family
- Convictions: Racketeering, extortion, murder (1998)
- Penalty: 455 years' imprisonment (1998)

Anthony Salvatore Casso (May 21, 1942 – December 15, 2020), nicknamed "Gaspipe", was an American mobster and underboss in the Lucchese crime family of New York City. Regarded as a "homicidal maniac", Casso confessed to involvement in between fifteen and thirty-six murders. In interviews, and in court testimony, Casso confessed involvement in the killings of Frank DeCicco, Roy DeMeo and Vladimir Reznikov. He also admitted to several attempts to murder Gambino family boss John Gotti.

Following his arrest in January 1993, Casso became one of the highest-ranking members of the Italian-American Mafia to turn informant. After taking a plea bargain in March 1994, he was placed in the witness protection program. In October 1997, Casso was dropped from the program after several infractions, including bribing prison guards to smuggle contraband, giving out false statements during court trials, association with known felons and assaulting inmates. Later that year, a federal judge sentenced him to 455 years in prison for racketeering, extortion and murder.

Casso died in prison custody from complications related to COVID-19 on December 15, 2020.

== Early life ==
Anthony Casso was born on May 21, 1942, in South Brooklyn, New York City, the youngest of the three children to Michael and Margaret Casso (née Cuccuello). His grandparents had immigrated to the United States from the Italian region of Campania in the 1890s. Casso's godfather was Salvatore Callinbrano, a "made man" (full member) and caporegime (captain) in the Genovese crime family, which maintained a powerful influence on the Brooklyn docks during the mid-20th century. Casso dropped out of school at age 16 and got a job with his father as a longshoreman. In his youth, he became a crack shot, firing pistols at targets on a rooftop which he and his friends used as a shooting range. He also made money shooting predatory hawks for pigeon keepers.

== Lucchese crime family ==
=== Early criminal career ===
A violent youth, Casso was a member of the infamous South Brooklyn Boys street gang. In 1958 he was arrested after a "rumble" against a rival Irish American gang. Casso later told biographer Philip Carlo that his father visited him at the police station and tried in vain to scare him straight. Casso soon caught the eye of Christopher "Christie Tick" Furnari, a mobster in the Lucchese crime family and the captain of the "19th Hole Crew" in Brooklyn. With Furnari's support, Casso started running a small loan sharking operation. Furnari also used Casso as muscle for his gambling and drug dealing rackets. Casso's second arrest, for attempted murder, occurred in 1961, but he was acquitted when the alleged victim refused to identify him.

=== 19th Hole Crew ===
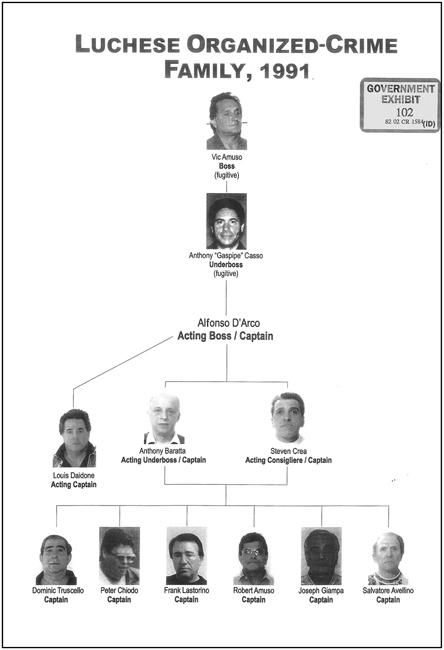
The Lucchese crime family, 1991

In 1974, at age 32, Casso was inducted a "made man" in the Lucchese family and joined Vincent Foceri's crew, which operated from 116th Street in Manhattan and from Fourteenth Avenue in Brooklyn. Shortly after his induction, Casso became close to another rising star in the family, Victor Amuso, and began a partnership that lasted for two decades. Casso and Amuso committed scores of crimes, including drug trafficking, burglary and murder. The two men were noted within the family for their success and subsequently moved to the more prominent 19th Hole Crew operated by Furnari.

Within the 19th Hole Crew, Casso and Amuso led a burglary ring known as "The Bypass Gang," which included expert locksmiths, safe crackers and experts in security alarm systems. Authorities estimated that the gang stole more than $100 million from safety deposit boxes and vaults across New York City and Long Island during the 1970s and 1980s. When Furnari was promoted to act as the Lucchese family's consigliere, he considered promoting Casso to succeed him as captain of the 19th Hole Crew. Casso declined, suggesting that Amuso be promoted instead; he subsequently became Amuso's trusted right hand.

In December 1985, Casso was approached by Gambino captain Frank DeCicco regarding a planned coup within the Gambino crime family. Fellow Gambino caporegime John Gotti, whose crew had worked with Casso to conduct drug deals, as well as other Gambino captains, were planning to kill boss Paul Castellano, believing that he was too weak to lead their crime family. Gotti and DeCicco sought support for the plot among four of New York's other crime families. According to Sammy Gravano, another of Gotti's co-conspirators, DeCicco returned from the meeting saying that Casso had offered the conspirators his unconditional support.

According to Casso, DeCicco alleged during their meeting that Castellano's carelessness in allowing his own house to be bugged was reason enough to kill him. Casso later told Carlo that he tried to talk DeCicco out of killing a boss without first asking for permission from the Commission, the Mafia's governing body. Otherwise, he said, killing Castellano would be a cardinal violation of Mafia rules and all participants would be murdered by the other families. Castellano's murder went ahead anyway on December 16, 1985. Casso later denounced Gotti's actions to Carlo as "the beginning of the end of our thing."

As Casso had warned, Lucchese boss Anthony Corallo and Genovese boss Vincent Gigante decided to kill Gotti, DeCicco and every other conspirator in Castellano's murder. Amuso and Casso were chosen to handle the assassinations and were instructed to use a car bomb to try and shift suspicion to Sicilian mobsters, or "zips", related to Castellano. While New York mafiosi had long been officially banned from using bombs due to the risk of collateral damage, Sicilian mafiosi and members of the Cleveland crime family were notorious for using such devices. Amuso and Casso made one attempt on the lives of Gotti and DeCicco, planting a bomb in DeCicco's car when the two were scheduled to visit a social club on April 13, 1986. Gotti cancelled at the last minute, and the bomb instead only killed DeCicco and injured a passenger the pair had mistaken for Gotti.

=== Taking over the family with Amuso ===
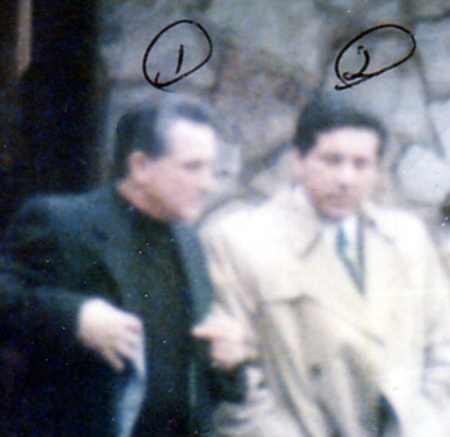
An FBI surveillance photograph of Casso (right) with Lucchese family boss Vittorio Amuso

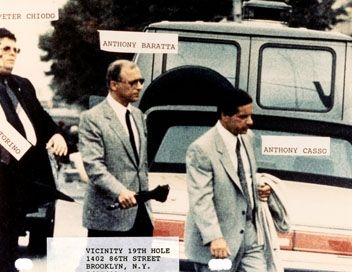
An FBI surveillance photograph of Baratta, Casso and Chiodo

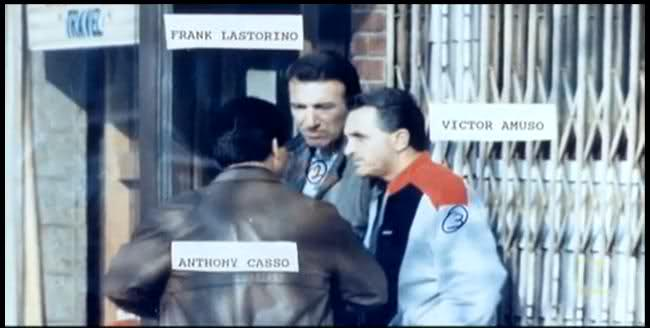
An FBI surveillance photograph of Casso, Victor Amuso and Frank Lastorino

By November 1986, Corallo was sensing that the Mafia Commission Trial would result in a guilty verdict that would ensure the entire Lucchese leadership would die in prison. Wanting to maintain the family's half-century tradition of a seamless transfer of power, he called both Casso and Amuso to Furnari's Staten Island home. Casso turned down the promotion to boss and instead suggested that Amuso be given the position. Amuso formally took over the family in 1987 and Casso succeeded Furnari as consigliere. Casso later took over the role of underboss in 1989 after Mariano Macaluso retired.

In their new positions, Amuso and Casso shared huge profits from the Lucchese family's illegal activities. These profits included $15,000 to $20,000 a month from extorting Long Island delivery and carting companies, $75,000 a month in kickbacks from eight air freight carriers operating in the New York area in exchange for no labor action from workers over their low benefits, $20,000 a week in profits from unlicensed video game machines set up in businesses with connections to the family and $245,000 annually from a major family-owned concrete supplier. Amuso and Casso also split more than $200,000 per year from protection rackets in the Garment District, as well as a cut of all the crimes committed by the family's soldiers.

In one instance, Casso and Amuso split $800,000 from the Colombo crime family for Casso's aid in helping them rob steel from a construction site on the West Side Highway in Manhattan. In another instance, the two bosses received $600,000 from the Gambino family for allowing them to take over a Lucchese-protected contractor for a housing complex project on Coney Island. Casso also controlled Greek-American crime boss George Kalikatas, who gave Casso $683,000 in protection money in 1990 alone to operate an extortion, loan sharking and gambling organization in Astoria, Queens.

=== Eastern European connections ===
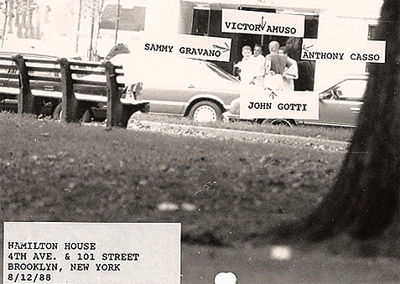
An FBI surveillance photograph of Amuso, Casso, Gotti and Gravano

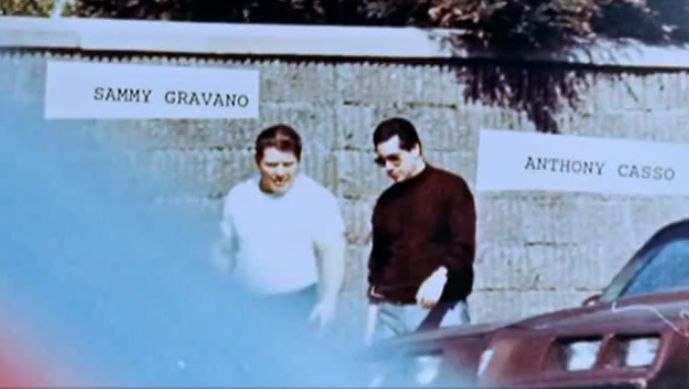
An FBI surveillance photograph of Casso and Sammy Gravano

Casso had a close alliance with Russian Mafia boss Marat Balagula, who operated a multi-billion dollar gasoline bootlegging scam in Brighton Beach. After Colombo caporegime Michael Franzese began shaking down his crew, Balagula approached Furnari and asked for a sit-down at the 19th Hole Crew's headquarters in Brooklyn. According to Casso, Furnari declared:

Here there's enough for everybody to be happy...to leave the table satisfied. What we must avoid is trouble between us and the other families. I propose to make a deal with the others so there's no bad blood ... Meanwhile, we will send word out that from now on you and your people are with the Lucchese family. No one will bother you. If anyone does bother you, come to us and Anthony will take care of it.

Street tax from Balagula's organization was not only strategically shared but also became the Five Families' biggest moneymaker after drug trafficking. According to Carlo:

It didn't take long for word on the street to reach the Russian underworld: Marat Balagula was paying off the Italians; Balagula was a punk; Balagula had no balls. Balagula's days were numbered. This, of course, was the beginning of serious trouble. Balagula did in fact have balls, he was a ruthless killer when necessary, but he also was a smart diplomatic administrator and he knew that the combined, concerted force of the Italian crime families would quickly wipe the newly arrived Russian competition off the proverbial map.

Shortly afterward, Balagula's rival, a fellow Russian immigrant named Vladimir Reznikov, drove up to the former's office building in the Midwood section of Brooklyn. Sitting in his car, Reznikov opened fire on the building with an AK-47. One of Balagula's close associates was killed and several secretaries were wounded. Then, on June 12, 1986, Reznikov entered the Rasputin nightclub in Brighton Beach and placed a 9mm Beretta against Balagula's head, demanding $600,000 in exchange for not pulling the trigger. He also demanded a percentage of everything Balagula was involved in. After Balagula promised to get the money, Reznikov threatened him and his family.

Shortly after Reznikov left, Balagula suffered a massive heart attack. He insisted on being treated at his home in Brighton Beach, where he felt it would be harder for Reznikov to kill him. When Casso arrived, he listened to Balagula's story and became enraged, later telling Carlo that in his mind, Reznikov had just spat in the face of the entire Mafia. Casso told Balagula, "Send word to Vladimir that you have his money, that he should come to the club tomorrow. We'll take care of the rest." Balagula responded, "You're sure? This is an animal. It was him that used a machine gun in the office." Casso responded, "Don't concern yourself. I promise we'll take care of him...Okay?" Casso then requested a photograph of Reznikov and a description of his car.

Following the meeting, Casso and Amuso received Furnari's permission to have Reznikov killed. The following day, Reznikov returned to the nightclub, expecting to pick up his money. Upon realizing that Balagula wasn't there, Reznikov launched into a barrage of profanity and stormed back to the parking lot. There, DeMeo crew veteran Joseph Testa walked up behind Reznikov and shot him dead. Testa then jumped into a car driven by Anthony Senter and left the scene. According to Casso, "After that, Marat didn't have any problems with other Russians."

=== Cementing power ===
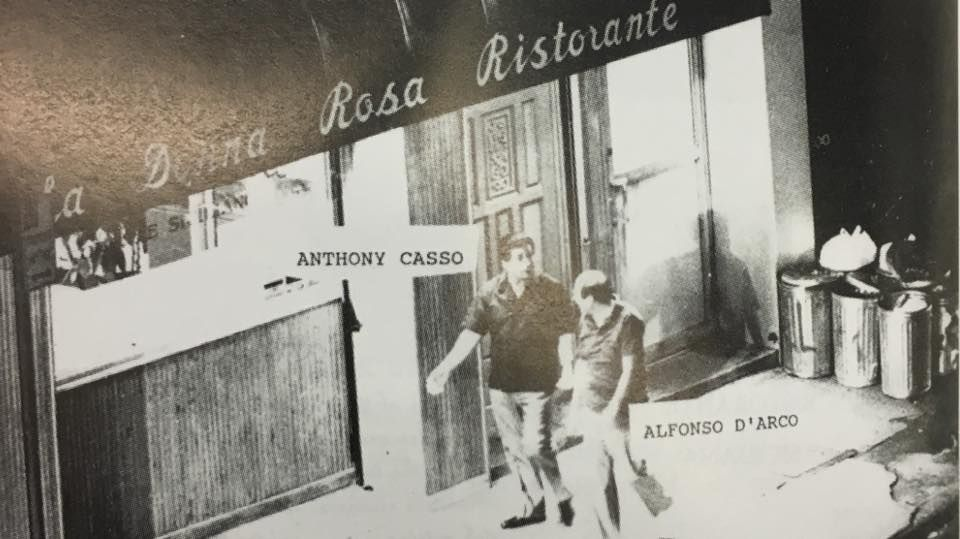
A FBI surveillance photograph of Casso and Al D'Arco

In 1988, after Lucchese captain Paul Vario died in federal prison, Amuso promoted Alphonse D'Arco as leader of Vario's former crew. Two years later, Amuso selected D'Arco to organize a "construction panel", composed of Lucchese family members, that would oversee the Lucchese-controlled labor unions and construction companies and co-ordinate joint business ventures with the other families. Many years later, D'Arco explained his role under Amuso and Casso's leadership of the Lucchese family: "When a job needed to be done, whenever they needed to do something unpleasant to someone, I was the prick chosen by them."

In the infamous "whack Jersey order," Amuso and Casso ordered D'Arco and the Vario crew to murder the Lucchese family's entire Jersey crew after captain Anthony Accetturo refused a direct order to increase the family's share of their profits. Accetturo was particularly enraged that Casso and Amuso also had ordered the assassination of his wife. Casso alleged during interviews with Carlo that Accetturo had involved his wife in the running of the Jersey crew and that therefore Accetturo alone was responsible for the contract put on her. Accetturo considered the contract a violation of the Mafia's longstanding rule against killing mobsters' relatives who are not involved in mob activity and chose accordingly to become a federal informant.

=== Fugitive ===
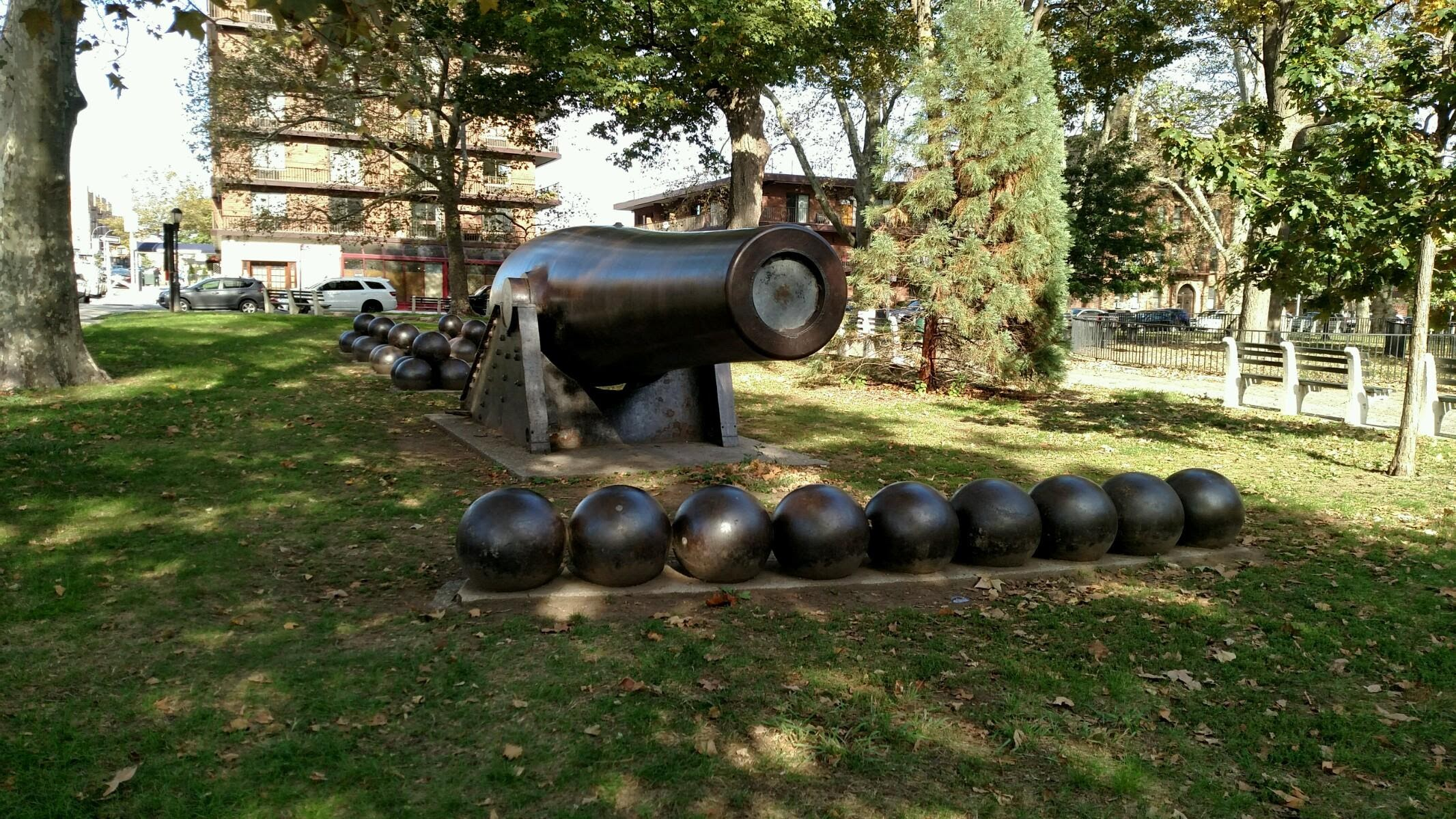
The Civil War-era Rodman Gun at John Paul Jones Park, near Verrazano Bridge in Bay Ridge, Brooklyn.

In January 1991, Casso received an early warning from a secret law enforcement source about an upcoming federal indictment. Shortly before he and Amuso both went into hiding, he summoned D'Arco to a meeting at the Rodman gun at John Paul Jones Park. Casso gave D'Arco a list of phone booth numbers and secret addresses, informing D'Arco that he was in charge of the Lucchese family as acting boss until further notice. D'Arco subsequently met with Casso and Amuso twice in Scranton, Pennsylvania, and several times at safe houses in Brooklyn.

In early 1991, Amuso and Casso ordered the murder of made man and captain Peter Chiodo, a fellow Windows Case defendant who had pleaded guilty without asking their permission. Casso assigned the murder to D'Arco, who was shocked at the order considering Casso's previous closeness with Chiodo. On May 8, 1991, two Lucchese shooters ambushed Chiodo at a gas station in Staten Island. Chiodo received twelve bullet wounds in the arms, legs and torso, but survived the attack. Doctors credited Chiodo's obesity with saving his life, as none of the slugs penetrated a vital organ or artery. However, he sustained several abdominal wounds and permanent damage to his right arm.

Following the assassination attempt, Casso delivered a blunt threat through Chiodo's lawyer that, if he testified, his wife would be murdered. Such a threat was a violation of a longstanding Mafia rule against killing mobsters' relatives who are not involved in mob activity. While Chiodo had angrily refused every previous offer to flip, Casso's threat convinced him to become a government witness in order to protect his family.

Meanwhile, D'Arco knew that Amuso and Casso blamed him for the failure of the Chiodo hit and grew certain that they were planning to kill him. In July 1991, in a Staten Island meeting, Amuso and Casso replaced D'Arco as acting boss with a four-man panel of captains. While D'Arco was named to this panel, he remained certain that Amuso and Casso no longer trusted him.

On July 29, 1991, due to a tipoff from an unidentified Lucchese insider, Amuso was arrested and Casso became the de facto boss of the Lucchese family. It has been speculated that Casso himself was the source of the leak, as only a few people were privy to Amuso's location. This theory is contradicted by Carlo, who states that Casso was not only determined to find out who betrayed Amuso and kill them, but that he immediately sent $250,000 that was due to Amuso's wife in a shoe box. Casso, according to Carlo, had no desire to be boss of the family and attempted to arrange for Amuso's escape from federal custody after his arrest. To the disappointment of Casso and the Lucchese captains, Amuso refused to leave prison out of fear for his life. As a result, the captains asked Casso to take over as acting boss. Casso reluctantly accepted.

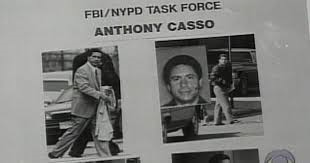
A FBI/NYPD Wanted poster of Anthony Casso

On September 21, 1991, certain that Amuso and Casso had marked him and his family for death, D'Arco telephoned the Connecticut home of FBI Agent Robert Marston. D'Arco explained that his life was in danger and that Casso had started killing the entire families of suspected informers, which had never previously been allowed. After some hesitation, he told Marston that he and his family were in hiding at his mother's house in Long Island. Later that night, D'Arco and his family entered the witness protection program.

In a further violation of Mafia code, Chiodo's extended family in Brooklyn soon suffered retaliation from Amuso and Casso. On March 10, 1992, Lucchese enforcer Michael Spinelli shot Chiodo's sister, Patricia Capozallo, while she was driving in Bensonhurst. Capozallo sustained bullet wounds in the arm, back and neck, but survived. In 1993, Casso also ordered George Zappola, Frank "Bones" Papagni and Lucchese consigliere Frank Lastorino to murder the Lucchese family's Bronx captain, Steven Crea.

Meanwhile, investigators from the Brooklyn District Attorney's office were using new technology to trace the location of cell phones. Lastorino, they found, was regularly calling a cell phone near Budd Lake, New Jersey. The DA's Office informed FBI Agent Richard Rudolph, who arranged for a federal warrant allowing Lastorino's phone to be tapped. As FBI agents listened in, they recognized Casso's voice. On January 19, 1993, Casso was arrested while coming out of the shower at the house he shared with his mistress, Rosemarie Billotti, in Mount Olive, New Jersey.

As FBI agents searched the house, they found a rifle, $340,000 in cash, a stack of FBI reports that had been provided to Amuso's defense attorneys and meticulous paperwork about the inner workings of the Lucchese family. The paperwork included monthly tabulations of how much money Casso and Amuso had received from each of their criminal operations. Casso had also written down a detailed list of the Christmas tribute money he and Amuso had received from each Lucchese crew. There was also a neatly typed list of proposed "made men", which was disguised as a list of wedding guests.

=== Incarcerated boss ===
Casso was held at New York's Metropolitan Correctional Center pending trial. Facing charges that would have all but assured he would die in prison, he continued ordering hits outside, but also began making escape plans. One plan almost succeeded when a bribed guard cleared him through security. Casso nearly walked out of jail, but was spotted by another guard and thwarted at the last minute. Afterwards, Casso began making plans for Lucchese members to find out what prison buses would be transporting him and arrange an ambush, as well as assassinating the presiding judge, Eugene Nickerson, to buy himself more time.

On February 2, 1993, the body of Frank Signorino, Chiodo's uncle, was found frozen in the trunk of a car in East New York. Signorino had been slain by multiple gunshot wounds to the head, which was wrapped in a black plastic bag. Then, on February 12, the Lucchese family burned down the garage of Annette Signorino, Chiodo's 95-year-old grandmother, in Gravesend, Brooklyn. Chiodo later told the FBI that he "couldn't believe someone would try to harm an old woman".

Casso's power came undone when he was stripped of his title as underboss by Amuso, who declared that all Lucchese mafiosi should consider him a pariah—in effect, banishing Casso from the family. Amuso had long been suspicious of Casso's failure to use his law enforcement contacts to find out who had betrayed him, and finally concluded Casso did it himself to seize control of the family.

The two lead prosecutors on the case, Charles Rose and Gregory O'Connell, later told Jerry Capeci that they had hoped to use Sammy Gravano as a witness against Casso. Gravano refused, as he reportedly feared that Casso would start killing members of his own extended family. However, D'Arco was reportedly very eager to testify against his former friend. According to FBI Agent Lucien Gandolfo, "He thought he was standing for what was right, but also for the old values that had been abandoned by the mob."

== Informant ==
Facing the prospect of a trial at which D'Arco, Acceturo and Chiodo were due to be star witnesses against him, as well as spending the rest of his life in prison, Casso reached out to FBI Agent Rudolph and offered to turn informant. Casso was immediately moved to the Federal Prison at La Tuna, near El Paso, Texas, and housed in the famous "Valachi Suite" as he debriefed. At the beginning of the first session, Casso joked, "Every time I stepped out of the house I committed a crime. You expect me to remember all of them?".

The agents urged Casso to start by revealing the "crystal ball", his nickname for a key intelligence source in law enforcement. Casso disclosed that decorated New York City Police Department (NYPD) detectives Stephen Caracappa and Louis Eppolito had been on his payroll and had committed eight murders under his orders. Casso further explained that Caracappa and Eppolito, who had also served on the Federal Organized Crime Strike Force, had also leaked the names of both police and FBI informants, which had resulted in many other murders.

Rose and O'Connell flew to Texas as the debriefing continued. Casso named scores of other mobsters he had conspired with, including Gigante. He also confessed to having sent hitmen to Rose's home with the intention of having him murdered. Casso also admitted to having plotted Nickerson's assassination in order to delay his own trial.

Casso initially confessed to twelve murders, but when pressed for details, he admitted to a further twenty-four. At the same time, he was found to have lied about how much money he possessed. Casso also denied all involvement in the murder of Chiodo's uncle or in the arson at the home of Chiodo's elderly grandmother. Increasingly skeptical, the FBI made Casso take a lie detector test, which he failed.

O'Connell later told Capeci that the decision not to use Casso as a witness was made when Casso, "with apparent delight", gleefully laughed as he described how he buried alive a young drug smuggling associate in the Florida Everglades. As Casso spoke, O'Connell and Rose, "read each other's thoughts. The story would probably not go over well with a jury." Both prosecutors flew back to New York convinced that Casso's knowledge of Mafia secrets did not matter. O'Connell later stated, "It gets to a point where somebody is just too evil to put on the stand."

Casso finalized a plea agreement at a hearing on March 1, 1994, where he pleaded guilty to seventy crimes, including racketeering, extortion and fifteen murders. The two lead prosecutors on the case, Rose and O'Connell, later said they'd feared Casso could be acquitted at trial, since they did not have any taped conversations as evidence. However, with Casso's guilty plea, O'Connell said they had Casso "tied up six ways to Sunday." While remaining in prison, Casso was placed in the witness protection program.

According to Carlo, when Casso revealed that he also had an FBI agent on the payroll, prosecutors ordered him to keep quiet. Casso alleges that he further enraged the federal government by accusing Gravano, who had denied ever having dealt in drugs, of buying large amounts of cocaine, heroin and marijuana from Casso over two decades. However, Casso was vindicated to some extent when Gravano pleaded guilty in 2000 to operating a massive narcotics ring, which included selling ecstasy to adolescents. He was the second confessed underboss of a New York crime family to break his blood oath and turn informer, after Gravano.

In 1998, Casso was removed from the witness protection program after prosecutors alleged numerous infractions, including bribing guards, assaulting other inmates and making "false statements" about Gravano and D'Arco. Casso's attorney tried to get Judge Frederic Block to overrule federal prosecutors in July 1998, but Block refused to do so. Shortly afterward, Block sentenced Casso to 455 years in prison without possibility of parole—the maximum sentence permitted under sentencing guidelines.

Casso later told New York Times organized-crime reporter Selwyn Raab that, before turning informer, he was seriously considering a deal that would have allowed him the possibility of parole after twenty-two years. "I help them and I get life without parole," he said. "This is really a fuckin' joke." Casso lost two subsequent appeals to get his sentence reduced.

In a 2006 letter to Carlo, Casso declared:

Dearest Carlo

I am truly regretful for my decision to cooperate with the Government. It was against all my beliefs and upbringing. I know for certain, had my father been alive, I would never have done so. I have disgraced my family heritage, lost the respect of my children and close friends, and most probably added to the sudden death of my wife and confidant for more than 35 years. I wish the clock could be turned back only to bring her back. I have never in my life informed on anyone. I have always hated rats and as strange as it may sound I still do. I surely hate myself, day after day. It would have definitely been different if the Government had honest witnesses from inception. I would have had a second chance to start a new life, and my wife Lillian would still be alive. It seems that the only people the Government awards freedom to are the ones who give prejudiced testimony to win convictions. "The truth will set you free", means nothing in the Federal courts. Even at this point in my life, I consider myself to be a better man than most of the people on the streets these days. With contempt and disdain

Tony Gaspipe

Having admitted to confessing his involvement in thirty-six murders, it is believed Casso participated in the murders of Johnny Coiro in June 1974, Thomas Barbusca in June 1974, Lee Schleifer in 1975, Roy DeMeo in January 1983, Vincent Albano in June 1985, Vincent DiPietro in 1986, Frank DeCicco in April 1986, Jimmy Hydell in October 1986, Nicholas Guido in November 1986, Vladimir Reznikov in June 1986, Carmine Varriale in December 1986, John Otto Heidel in October 1987, Anthony Bolino in May 1988, Eustachio "Leo" Giammona in June 1988, Sorecho "Sammy the Arab" Nalo in October 1988, Angelo Sigona in December 1988, Thomas "Red" Gilmore in February 1989, Michael Pappadio in May 1989, Julius Calder in June 1989, Robert Kubecka in August 1989, Donald Barstow in August 1989, John Petrucelli in September 1989, John "Sonny" Morrissey in September 1989, Anthony DiLapi in February 1990, James Bishop in May 1990, Michael Salerno in June 1990, Bruno Facciola in August 1990, Edward Lino in November 1990, Larry Taylor in February 1991, Al Visconti in March 1991, Bobby Boriello in May 1991, Anthony Fava in September 1991, Anthony Cuozzo in January 1992, Pasquale "Patty" Testa in December 1992 and Frank Signorino in February 1993.

== Personal life ==
Casso married fellow South Brooklyn native Lillian Delduca on May 4, 1968. They had a daughter and son.

Prior to his marriage to Delduca, Casso had a serious relationship with fellow South Brooklyn native Rosemarie Billotti, whose parents hoped he would marry. Without Delduca's knowledge, for decades after their wedding, Casso secretly kept Billotti as his mistress and set her up in a house in Mount Olive, New Jersey.

During his marriage, Casso committed many other infidelities. In an interview with Carlo, he recalled:

Most all men in my life, everyone I know, had girlfriends. It goes with the territory. Women are drawn to us, the power, the money, and we're drawn to them. But only in passing. Some guys treated their mistresses better than their wives, but that's a fuckin' outrage. No class. Only a cafone does that. I never loved any woman but Lillian. She and my family always came first.

Following his arrest inside Billotti's house in 1993, Casso's wife "was incensed, and felt betrayed—violated—used" when she learned that her husband had secretly continued his relationship with Billotti. Even though she eventually agreed to visit her husband in federal prison, for the rest of her life, according to Carlo, she "could not understand how Anthony could be so deceitful, duplicitous—such a two-faced pig."

== Incarceration and death ==
Casso began serving his sentence at the supermax prison ADX Florence in Florence, Colorado. He was transferred to the Federal Medical Center (FMC) at the Federal Correctional Complex in Butner, North Carolina, for the treatment of prostate cancer in March 2009. He was returned to ADX Florence in July 2009. In 2013, Casso was transferred to the Federal Residential Reentry Management Office in Minneapolis, Minnesota. This was not a prison facility, but an administrative designation for inmates assigned to home confinement, "halfway houses" or state and county correctional facilities.

As of May 2018, Casso had been transferred to the United States Medical Center for Federal Prisoners, an administrative security/medical prison in Springfield, Missouri. He was later transferred to USP Terre Haute. From March 25, 2020, he was serving his sentence at USP Tucson, a high security prison in Arizona. In his later years, Casso had developed complications related to prostate cancer, coronary artery disease, kidney disease, hypertension, bladder disease and lung issues from years of smoking.

On November 5, 2020, in the midst of the COVID-19 pandemic, Casso tested positive for COVID-19 while incarcerated. He was placed in medical isolation at USP Tucson. On November 9, he was transported to a local hospital due to respiratory distress, and on November 17, was put on a ventilator. His lawyers requested compassionate release, but that motion was rejected on November 28. Casso died from complications related to COVID-19 on December 15, 2020, at the age of 78.

== Works cited ==
- Carlo, Philip (2008). Gaspipe: Confessions of a Mafia Boss. New York: HarperCollins. ISBN 978-0061429842.
- Friedman, Robert I. (2000). Red Mafiya: How the Russian Mob Has Invaded America. Boston; New York; London: Little, Brown and Company. ISBN 0316294748.
- Lawson, Guy; Oldham, William (2007). The Brotherhoods. Pocket Books. ISBN 978-1-4165-2338-3.
- Raab, Selwyn (2005). Five Families: The Rise, Decline and Resurgence of America's Most Powerful Mafia Empires (2006 ed.). New York: Thomas Dunne Books. ISBN 978-0312361815.
- Volkman, Ernest (1998). Gangbusters: The Destruction of America's Last Great Mafia Dynasty (1999 paperback ed.). New York: Avon Books. ISBN 0380732351.

Business positions
Preceded by Mariano "Mac" Macaluso	Lucchese crime family Underboss; 1989–1993	Succeeded by Steven Crea
