= Frank Amato =

American mobster (1942–1980)

- Born: c. 1942; New York City, New York, U.S.
- Disappeared: September 20, 1980
- Died: September 20, 1980 (aged 38); New York City, New York, U.S.
- Cause of death: Gunshot wounds
- Occupations: Burglar, truck hijacker, butcher, window salesman
- Allegiance: Gambino crime family

Frank Amato (/ˈɑːmətoʊ/ AH-mə-toh, Italian: [aˈmaːto]; disappeared September 20, 1980, pronounced legally dead 1985) was a Sicilian-American mafioso who was the son-in-law of Gambino crime family boss Paul Castellano.

== Biography ==
There is little information available on Frank Amato before his marriage into the Castellano-Gambino-Lucchese blood relative family. Amato was an Italian-American of Sicilian descent from Brooklyn, New York. Frank was born out of wedlock and raised in a blue collar family in New York City. He worked as a butcher and as a transport truck hijacker for a crew in the Gambino crime family that robbed transport trucks coming in and out of John F. Kennedy Airport. He was a fellow criminal associate of transport truck hijacker Edward Grillo. His marriage to Constance was an Old World traditional Sicilian style wedding that was attended by many powerful Gambino mobsters.

=== Legitimate business career ===
FBI Special Agent Joseph O'Brien states in Boss of Bosses: The FBI and Paul Castellano that after Amato married Paul Castellano's daughter, Constance, Castellano set Amato up in the legitimate business world as a distributor of Italian ice. Castellano greatly misjudged Amato who did not share the same keen business sense as Castellano and the Italian ice distribution business failed. Castellano put Amato to work as a butcher at his successful Meat Palace, a butcher shop franchise owned by Castellano and his sons. As a butcher employed at Dial Meat Purveyors Inc. and the Meat Market, he was involved in the selling of rancid and expired meat products. Although Amato had little formal school education, he could quarter a lamb with great skill and was knowledgeable about tallow. In Boss of Bosses, Agent O'Brien suggests that at Dial Meat and the Meat Market he was taught by Castellano's men how to bleach tainted, outdated, uninspected meats or meats of a dubious provenance by using a white preservative powder known as "dynamite" that gave the faded, discolored meat a healthy fresh red appearance. Frank was also shown how to drain meat of any foul smelling juices it had accumulated by using formaldehyde and use counterfeit United States Department of Agriculture stamps to assign meats a false grade or expiration date. O'Brien would also state that at Castellano's meat suppliers he would have Amato and fellow butchers carve meat and label it as "beef" that was not always carved from cows and "pork" that was not always carved from pigs.

=== FBI scrutiny ===
Because of his involvement in Castellano's stranglehold on the East Coast wholesale meat market and the United Food and Commercial Workers Union, Amato became a target for the Federal Bureau of Investigation (FBI) early on in the successful investigation dubbed "Operation Meathead". Castellano's sons, Joseph and Phillip, managed the chain. There is no evidence that Castellano promoted or wanted to induct Amato as a "made man" into the Gambino crime family. Dial Meat Purveyors, Inc. also served Waldbaum's and Key Food Cooperative on whose boards of directors Gambino crime family capo Pasquale Conte sat as a member.

=== Infidelities and divorce from Constance ===
Although married to Constance, after turning state's evidence, Gambino crime family associate, Dominick Montiglio, informed authorities that Frank had been witnessed by mob associates and superiors, like capo Anthony Gaggi, making sexual advances and having had brief encounters with the female employees who worked with him at the Meat Palace. A few weeks after Gaggi witnessed this, Castellano had the female employee fired. Amato was later transferred to Castellano's other butcher store chain, Dial Meat Purveyors, Inc., formerly known as Blue Ribbon Meats, the business that helped poultry magnate Frank Perdue distribute his chickens in supermarket chains. Amato worked for brother-in-law, Paul Castellano Jr. After a few months of working at Dial Poultry, Amato was caught committing adultery.

After he caught Amato having an affair with a co-worker, Paul Castellano became enraged and ordered Amato to move out of the Todt Hill mansion and had him fired from his job as a butcher at Dial Poultry. After being fired, Amato found work at a clothing store in Queens with the help of cousins-in-law Thomas Gambino and Joseph Gambino, the sons of Carlo Gambino, and supplemented his meager income by committing petty burglaries. Constance moved to West Palm Beach, Florida and lived in her father's condominium to overcome her emotional distress.

Constance was granted a divorce from Amato in 1973 on grounds of spousal abuse and infidelity. Following the divorce, and after her mother Nina separated from her father for having an affair with their live-in Colombian housekeeper and maid Gloria Olarte, Constance left her father. After moving with her mother into a nearby home, it was reported by FBI Special Agent Joseph O'Brien that she hardly ever left her mother's home and remained at her mother's side constantly.

=== Mob slaying and aftermath ===
On September 20, 1980, Amato was lured to the Gemini Lounge in Flatlands, Brooklyn under the pretense of meeting Roy DeMeo to discuss a business deal. On the orders of Paul Castellano, DeMeo shot Amato to death with a machine gun, and DeMeo and members of his crew – Henry Borelli, Anthony Senter, Joseph Testa, and Frederick and Richard DiNome – dismembered his corpse. The DeMeo crew then used a cabin cruiser owned by Richard DiNome to dispose of Amato's remains several miles out to sea. Castellano, DeMeo, Testa, Borelli, Senter, Richard DiNome, Joseph Guglielmo and Nino Gaggi were later charged with his disappearance and suspected murder, but no convictions were ever obtained. Constance later married a business associate and friend of the family, alleged mob associate Joseph Catalonotti. Connie bore a daughter, Andria, and the couple moved into a modest mansion on Todt Hill, not far from her family homestead. Joseph Catalanotti died on November 8, 1999, at the age of 55.

== Bibliography ==
- Murder Machine by Gene Mustain and Jerry Capeci
- Mafia Dynasty: The Rise and Fall of the Gambino Crime Family by John H. Davis
- Contemporary Issues in Organized Crime by Jay S. Albanese
- Boss of Bosses: The Fall of the Godfather, The FBI and Paul Castellano by Joseph F. O'Brien and Andris Kurins
