= Chris Rosenberg =

American criminal (1950–1979)

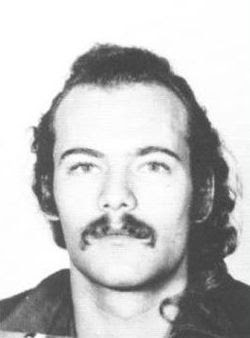
- Mugshot
- Born: October 6, 1950; Canarsie, Brooklyn, New York, U.S.
- Died: May 11, 1979 (aged 28); Brooklyn, New York, U.S.
- Cause of death: Gunshot wounds
- Other name: Chris DeMeo
- Occupations: Car thief, drug dealer

Harvey "Chris" Rosenberg (October 6, 1950 – May 11, 1979), also known as Chris DeMeo and Christopher Rosalia, was an American gangster who was a member of the DeMeo crew run by Gambino crime family soldier Roy DeMeo. The gang is suspected of between 75 and 200 murders in the mid-1970s to the early 1980s. Following a failed narcotics deal with a Cuban drug cartel that Rosenberg stole from, DeMeo killed Rosenberg as restitution.

== Early life ==
Chris Rosenberg grew up in Canarsie on a block dominated by Italian-Americans. He attended Samuel J. Tilden High School in East Flatbush, Brooklyn. Despite the Mafia rule that only full Italians could be "made", or officially inducted into the organization, Rosenberg reportedly believed that his earning abilities and willingness to murder might eventually lead to his becoming a member of Cosa Nostra. He reportedly did not like his Jewish last name, and preferred for people to call him "Chris DeMeo" instead.

== Career ==
Rosenberg's criminal career began at the age of 13, when he began dealing marijuana. His first arrest was in 1970 for car theft, which started out as a felony case but was reduced to a misdemeanor. He was given probation rather than jail time. He was arrested again in 1971 for possession of the drug hashish, then again in 1972 for the attempted theft of a snow plow. Both cases were dismissed.

== DeMeo crew ==
Rosenberg was dealing in small amounts of marijuana and hashish when he first met Roy DeMeo at a Canarsie gas station in 1966. DeMeo recruited Chris to steal cars, which would then be sold off through connections DeMeo had within Canarsie junkyards. Rosenberg was also the first crew member to interact with DeMeo socially at family barbecues and get-togethers at DeMeo's house.

Between his adept car abilities as well as his fledgling drug business, Rosenberg became successful and opened his own car shop named Car Phobia Repairs, which soon became a hotspot for stolen vehicles. By 1972, Rosenberg had his friends stealing cars for him. Two of these friends were the Gemini twins, Joseph Testa and Anthony Senter, who Rosenberg would introduce to DeMeo and become two core members of the DeMeo crew. Testa and Senter, who were both full-blooded Italians, had known Rosenberg since their teenage years.

== Andrei Katz murder ==
By 1974, Rosenberg, now 23, began selling cocaine and quaaludes, again backed by DeMeo. He acquired the Quaaludes through a pharmacist connection, as well as the cocaine, which at the time could be prescribed for medical purposes. Through this pharmacist, Chris Rosenberg and the rest of the early DeMeo crew met 22-year-old Andrei Katz, a man who became what was most likely the crew's first murder victim. When Katz was arrested because of a stolen vehicle he purchased from the crew, he blamed Rosenberg for his predicament.

The situation soon escalated to violence when Katz was pulled from his vehicle and severely beaten by two men and put in the hospital. Andrei's brother Victor later testified in court that Andrei claimed the two men were Testa and Senter. Victor also testified that while still in the hospital recovering from his injuries, Andrei swore to his brother that he would get revenge on Chris and the others.

The revenge came on November 13, 1974, when Rosenberg opened his garage door and was struck with 3 bullets fired from an automatic rifle. Rosenberg survived through sheer luck, one bullet hitting him in the lower jaw, another his right arm and a third that was aimed for his chest merely glancing off. Surviving what should have been a fatal shooting, Rosenberg was reportedly furious. His jaw was left disfigured from the bullet wound. Despite undergoing reconstructive surgery, from that point on Rosenberg wore a beard to mask the scars that resulted from this attack.

The man who had shot Rosenberg that morning was never seen, but it was assumed by Rosenberg and the rest of the DeMeo Crew to be Andrei Katz. After this incident, and while Rosenberg was still in the hospital recovering from his gunshot wounds, DeMeo met with his followers and it was decided that Katz had to be murdered.

Directly taking care of Katz was considered by the men to be too much of a risk due to the back and forth violence that had already occurred. Henry Borelli, who had become involved with the crew shortly after Chris was shot, suggested that he use a woman friend of his to bait Andrei to a location where he could be abducted and then dealt with discreetly. Arriving at the woman's apartment complex expecting to take her out on a date, Andrei was forcefully abducted by Rosenberg, Borelli, Testa and Senter and taken to the meat department of a grocery store, where DeMeo was waiting.

It was this night, Friday, June 13, 1975, that the DeMeo crew is first known to have been involved with murder and dismemberment. While first-hand accounts of the incident are unavailable, information provided by crew members who cooperated with the government years later as well as the actual remains of Andrei Katz provided clues that were used by law enforcement as well as author Jerry Capeci to reconstruct the events. Katz was stabbed multiple times in the heart with a butcher knife, presumably by Rosenberg in revenge for the shooting that had ruined his face.

After Katz was already dead, his body was stabbed over a dozen times in the back, again presumably by Rosenberg. Katz's body was then stripped of its clothes and dismembered, likely by DeMeo and Testa, both former butcher apprentices. After the corpse was decapitated, one of the men, presumed to be Rosenberg, crushed the head with a machine normally used to compact cardboard boxes. Because of the damage done to the remains, dental records had to be used in order to positively identify the victim as Katz.

Although the woman friend of Henry Borelli's would confess her role soon after learning about Katz's murder, she was unable to identify Rosenberg. Borelli and Testa were arrested however, and spent months in jail while waiting for trial. They would secure an acquittal in January 1976, but the case would come back to haunt the surviving members of the crew in the late 1980s, when a Federal/State task force targeted the DeMeo Crew.

The nephew of DeMeo's superior Anthony Gaggi within the Gambino Family, Dominick Montiglio, later testified that he learned of the murder from Rosenberg shortly after it happened. He also testified that Rosenberg claimed Katz's murder had driven DeMeo and his crew to decide that any future conflicts would be settled in a similar manner of dismemberment to make the victim disappear.

== Gemini Method ==
The rest of the 1970s would see Rosenberg, along with the rest of the DeMeo crew, commit many more killings. The victims included suspected informants and other mobsters DeMeo and his followers were contracted to kill. Dominick Montiglio, who visited DeMeo frequently to pick up payments for Anthony Gaggi, said in an interview that if the crew didn't kill at least three people a week, they would be depressed. Some were shot to death and left to be found, but the majority of murders committed by the crew followed what came to be known as the "Gemini Method", named so because the main location where the murders took place was the Gemini Lounge, the headquarters of the DeMeo crew through much of the late 1970s.

The Gemini Method usually consisted of the victim entering the apartment in back of the Lounge, dubbed 'The Clubhouse' by crew members. At this point, a crew member (almost always Roy DeMeo according to crew member turned government witness Frederick DiNome) would approach the victim with a silenced pistol and shoot them in the head, then wrap a towel around the head wound like a turban in order to prevent blood from pouring out. Immediately after, another crew member would stab the victim in the heart in order to prevent any more blood from pumping out of the gunshot wound.

By then, the victim would usually be dead, at which point the corpse would be dragged into a bathtub and hung over it for a short period of time. This was done so that the corpse would bleed out and the remaining blood would congeal, making the following step, the dismemberment of the victim, as clean as possible. The body parts would be put into bags, boxed and then sent off to Brooklyn's Fountain Avenue dump among other places.

Crew members who became government witnesses all contend that during the time period that Rosenberg was alive, he was always the crew member who stabbed the victims after they had been shot in the head. These same witnesses also claim that Rosenberg usually did the stabbings, as well as the subsequent dismembering of the body, in his boxer shorts or underwear in order to avoid staining the expensive clothes he wore.

Other victims murdered by the crew had their bodies either left where they were killed or dumped in nearby locations. They were killed for various reasons, usually involving cooperation with law enforcement or the drug trade, which Rosenberg was heavily involved in by the mid-to-late 70s. One victim, Kevin Guelli, had been given cocaine by Rosenberg to sell off to customers Guelli claimed he had available. When Rosenberg demanded payment shortly after giving him the drugs to sell, Guelli claimed someone had robbed his house and stolen the product. Rosenberg allegedly shot him dead on the spot. Another man was found shot to death and dumped into the trunk of a car allegedly after attempting to rip Rosenberg off in a marijuana deal.

== "Cuban Crisis" ==
By the late 1970s, Rosenberg's continued involvement in the drug trade as well as his business with the DeMeo Crew had given him a prosperous lifestyle. He was living in an affluent neighborhood and when not working was training for his pilot's license. He also owned a number of businesses, including a pizzeria and his body shop. His heavy involvement in drug trafficking included importing marijuana from Colombia and dealing in large quantities of cocaine. He was Roy DeMeo's second-in-command and when conducting drug deals sometimes referred to himself as "Chris DeMeo". Roy had become somewhat of a father figure to Rosenberg.

In 1979 he visited Florida to set up a cocaine deal with a loanshark customer of Roy DeMeo's who had entered the drug business in an attempt to pay off his debts. This man, Charles Padnick, was acquainted with a Cuban man named William Serrano. Serrano had connections with two Cuban drug merchants known only as "Pepon" and "El Negro". He was informed by Padnick that a group of Italians were interested in purchasing a large quantity of cocaine. After he met with Rosenberg, who introduced himself as Chris DeMeo, Serrano told his Cuban associates and a deal was set up, although Rosenberg was never informed of Serrano's source of the drugs.

A group of four, comprising Charles Padnick and William Serrano as well as the cousin and girlfriend of Serrano's Cuban drug connection "El Negro" flew to New York to facilitate the deal. Within hours of landing, they were shot to death, dismembered and disposed of by Rosenberg and other members of the DeMeo crew. That same night Rosenberg visited a hospital with gunshot wounds on his hand and on the side of his head, suggesting that the group may have tried to fight back before being killed. When the mysterious "El Negro" did not receive a phone call from his cousin or girlfriend that night to ensure that the sale had been completed, he contacted Charles Padnick's son Jamie in an attempt to get more information. Jamie Padnick flew to New York shortly after and disappeared as well after being murdered and dismembered by Rosenberg and his fellow crew members.

With the only information available being the location of New York City and the name "Chris DeMeo", the Cubans had contacts there inquire and eventually the situation led to Roy DeMeo and the Gambino family. Dominick Montiglio, the nephew of DeMeo's superior Anthony Gaggi, became a government witness in 1983 and claims that he was in charge of delivering messages back and forth between the Cubans' contact in New York and the Gambinos. "El Negro" stated that if Chris Rosenberg were murdered, there would be no further conflict. The murder would have to be in the newspapers, otherwise they would not believe it had actually occurred. After being ordered to kill Rosenberg by his superiors, DeMeo stalled for a number of weeks, reportedly due to the close relationship he and Rosenberg had. After a period of inaction on the part of the Gambinos, the Cuban drug lord sent a group of enforcers to New York and threatened violence if Rosenberg was not murdered soon.

During this situation between the Gambino family and the Cuban cartel, DeMeo committed his most public murder after mistaking a man for a Cuban assassin. The victim, Dominick Ragucci, was actually a 19-year-old paying his way through college by selling vacuum cleaners door to door. After DeMeo saw him parked in front of his house, he mistook him for a Cuban hitman and ended up pursuing the young man in a car chase that ended with Ragucci being shot to death by DeMeo after his vehicle became too damaged to continue driving. After this Anthony Gaggi met with DeMeo and ordered him to stop stalling and kill Rosenberg before there were any more innocent victims.

== Death ==
Rosenberg was reportedly never informed about the Cuban situation and thus had no indication that his life was in danger. On May 11, 1979, he went to the regular nightly meeting with DeMeo and crew. As he sat at the table with his associates, DeMeo pulled a pistol out of a brown bag sitting on the table and shot Rosenberg in the head, wounding but not killing him. When Rosenberg got up off the floor and stumbled onto one knee, Anthony Senter stood and shot him four more times in the head.

Rosenberg's body was then placed in his car, which was driven and left parked on a street near the Gateway National Recreation Area in New York City. Crew member Frederick DiNome then drove by the vehicle while Henry Borelli raked it with machine gun fire, to ensure the murder was a blatant enough assassination to guarantee that it would be mentioned in the local newspaper. This gave the Cubans proof of the killing and defused the situation. Witnesses claim that for years afterward DeMeo expressed genuine regret at having to kill Rosenberg.

Members of the DeMeo crew were suspects in Rosenberg's murder but there was not enough evidence to charge them. Years later however, the murder would be among many other charges in a 1984 indictment against the surviving crew members after cooperating witnesses for the government provided a great deal of information on the crew's activities. At the trial in 1988, testimony was given by Dominick Montiglio and Vito Arena linking the remnants of the DeMeo crew with Rosenberg's murder. In 1989 the defendants were convicted of all charges and Joseph Testa and Anthony Senter, the only core DeMeo Crew members who had not been murdered or already imprisoned, were sentenced to life in prison.

== Sources ==
- Murder Machine by Gene Mustain & Jerry Capeci, 1993, ISBN 0-451-40387-8.
- For The Sins of My Father: A Mafia Killer, His Son, and the Legacy of a Mob Life, by Al DeMeo, 2003, ISBN 978-0-7679-1129-0
- "2 Held in Murder of Auto Mechanic" (PDF). The New York Times. July 6, 1975. p. 34.(subscription required)
- William Glaberson (May 28, 1989). "After 15 Months, Mob Trial Nears End". The New York Times.
