= Vladimir Reznikov =

Ukrainian-American gangster

- Born: Vladimir Reznikov; Kiev, Ukrainian SSR, Soviet Union (now Ukraine)
- Died: June 13, 1986; Brooklyn, New York City, U.S.
- Cause of death: Murdered
- Other name: "Vadik" "Vadik Reznik"
- Occupation: Mobster
- Allegiance: Russian Mafia

Vladimir Reznikov was a Russian American gangster who was killed by in 1986 by the Lucchese crime family. Reznikov's murder remained unsolved until the 1994 cooperation of Lucchese acting boss Anthony Casso. According to Casso, the shooting was committed by Joseph Testa and Anthony Senter, two veterans of the DeMeo crew.

== Biography ==
=== Gangster career ===
In the spring of 1986, the Colombo crime family crew, led by Michael Franzese, began extorting associates of Marat Balagula, who was running a multibillion-dollar gasoline bootlegging operation. In response, Balagula asked for a sit-down with Christopher Furnari, the consiglieri for the Lucchese crime family. After the sit-down took place in Brooklyn's 19th Hole social club, Balagula agreed to pay street tax to the Lucchese family. The money was not only strategically shared, but became the Five Families' biggest moneymaker after narcotics trafficking.

According to Philip Carlo,

It didn't take long for word on the street to reach the Russian underworld: Marat Balagula was paying off the Italians; Balagula was a punk; Balagula had no balls. Balagula's days were numbered. This, of course, was the beginning of serious trouble. Balagula did in fact have balls—he was a ruthless killer when necessary—but he also was a smart diplomatic administrator and he knew that the combined, concerted force of the Italian crime families would quickly wipe the newly arrived Russian competition off the proverbial map.

Shortly afterward, on June 12, 1986, Vladimir Reznikov entered Balagula's headquarters at the Odessa nightclub. He pushed a 9mm Beretta into Balagula's skull and demanded the $600,000 that he alleged Balagula owed him. After Balagula promised to get the money, Reznikov allegedly snarled "Fuck with me and you're dead—‌you and your whole fucking family; I swear—‌you understand?", although all conversation took place in Russian, so proper translation is suspect.

Shortly after Reznikov left, Balagula suffered a massive heart attack. He insisted on being treated at his home in Brighton Beach, where he felt it would be harder for Reznikov to gain access to him. When Lucchese underboss Anthony Casso arrived, he listened to what had happened and said, "Send word to Vladimir that you have his money, that he should come to the club tomorrow. We'll take care of the rest." Casso requested a photograph of Reznikov and a description of his car.

The following day, Reznikov arrived at Balagula's nightclub for the meeting. Instead, Reznikov was attacked by Gambino associate Joseph Testa from behind, who fatally shot him on Casso's orders. According to Casso, "After that, Marat didn't have any problems with other Russians."

== Sources ==
- Carlo, Philip (2008). Gaspipe : confessions of a Mafia boss. New York: William Morrow. ISBN 978-0-06-142984-2. OCLC 179805638.
- Friedman, Robert I. (2008). Red Mafiya: How the Russian Mob Has Invaded America. Little, Brown and Company. ISBN 978-0-316-29474-4.
