= Loyalty and Betrayal =

Loyalty and Betrayal may refer to:

- Loyalty & Betrayal: The Story of the American Mob, a 1994 documentary film
- Loyalty and Betrayal (Against album), or the title song
- Loyalty and Betrayal (E-40 album), or the title song
