= Anthony Senter and Joseph Testa =

American mobsters

Anthony Senter
- Born: Anthony Michael Senter; March 31, 1955 (age 71); New York City, New York, U.S.
- Other names: "Tony"; "The Twin"
- Occupation: Unemployed United Brotherhood of Carpenters and Joiners of America carpenter's assistant
- Children: 1
- Status: Paroled (2023)
- Allegiance: Gambino crime family; Lucchese crime family
- Convictions: Racketeering, 10 counts of murder
- Penalty: Life imprisonment (1989)

Joseph Testa
- Born: Joseph Carmine Testa Jr. January 24, 1955; New York City, New York, U.S.
- Died: January 26, 2026 (aged 71); Henderson, Nevada, U.S.
- Other names: "Joey"; "The Twin"
- Spouse: JoAnn Testa
- Children: 2
- Relatives: Patrick Testa (brother)
- Status: Paroled (2024)
- Allegiance: Gambino crime family; Lucchese crime family
- Convictions: Racketeering, 10 counts of murder
- Penalty: Life imprisonment (1989)

Anthony Senter (born March 31, 1955) and Joseph Testa (January 24, 1955 – January 26, 2026), better known as the Gemini twins, are two American mobsters who were associated with the Gambino crime family before being "made" in the Lucchese crime family. Senter and Testa are former members of the DeMeo crew in the Gambino family. In June 1989, both Senter and Testa were found guilty of racketeering and 10 counts of murder, and each was sentenced to life in federal prison. However, both men were eligible for parole since their crimes were committed before federal parole was abolished in 1987. Senter and Testa were paroled in 2023 and 2024, respectively. It is believed Testa and Senter had participated in at least 28 murders, from between 1975 and 1987, although they were initially indicted in 1989 for committing 11 murders. Testa and Senter primally worked for Gambino family soldier Roy DeMeo before his murder in January 1983, and later for Anthony "Gaspipe" Casso and Vic "Little Vic" Amuso, who served as underboss and family boss, respectively, for the Lucchese family, before Casso defected as a government witness in March 1994, and Amuso continues to serve as the Lucchese family boss since his accession in 1987. Casso admitted to participation in at least 36 murders, some of which Testa and Senter had also participated with. According to former Assistant U.S. Attorney and Deputy Police Commissioner of New York City for Internal Affairs, Walter Mack Jr., he had linked Testa and Senter to committing 20 murders.

== Early lives ==
Anthony Michael Senter was born to Michael Senter, an Italian immigrant from Rovereto, Trentino, and his wife. He had one sibling, a sister. According to the authors Jerry Capeci and Gene Mustain in the book Murder Machine, Senter is a "full-blooded Italian". Philip Carlo, however, wrote in Gaspipe: Confessions of a Mafia Boss that he is of only partial Italian descent and thus "could not be made" into the Mafia. Senter grew up in a turbulent home. His parents divorced when he was eight years old then remarried each other when he was fourteen. Senter's uncle, Gambino and Colombo associate Robert Senter, owned the Canarsie Recycling Company. As a young man Anthony worked at both his father's small debris removal business and his uncle's sanitation company.

Senter married an Italian-American woman on July 24, 1977, at a catering hall in Canarsie, Brooklyn. The wedding was attended by many criminals including Gambino crime family member Roy DeMeo.

Joseph Carmine Testa was one of nine children born to Italian American parents, a transport truck driver father and a housewife mother. Like Senter, Testa had a turbulent home life as a child, and he became a juvenile delinquent after his mother died of a blood clot when he was thirteen years old. One of his younger brothers, Patrick "Patty" Testa, also became a mobster. As a teenager, Testa worked as a carpenter's helper and as an apprentice butcher.

== Gemini twins ==
Senter and Testa became close friends while growing up on the same block in Canarsie, Brooklyn. They became involved in auto theft and marijuana dealing after dropping out of high school. Joseph Testa's brother Patrick, an expert car thief, frequently accompanied them. By 1970, at the age of 15, Senter and Testa had had multiple arrests for car theft but had all of their cases dismissed because they were juveniles at the time.

Senter and Testa were fanatically loyal to one another. In 1973, Testa was nearly killed in a bar fight with a Puerto Rican opponent, when the assailant's knife punctured his lung, resulting in him suffering from respiratory problems for the rest of his life. Afterwards, Senter hunted down the Puerto Rican and nearly beat him to death with his fists.

=== DeMeo crew ===
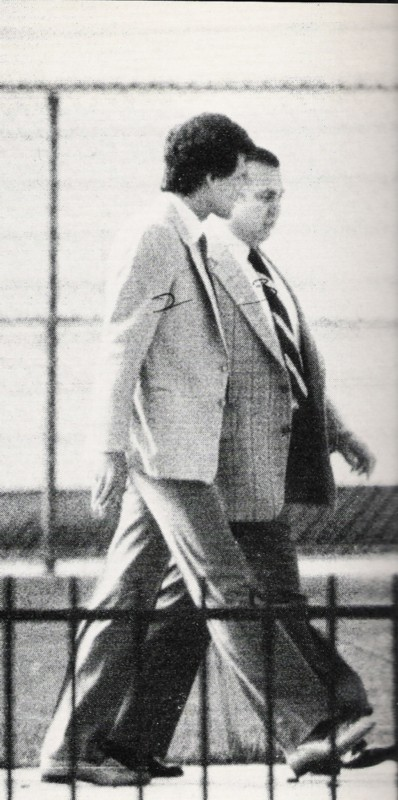
Testa (left) and Roy DeMeo in a 1982 FBI surveillance photo

Senter and Testa became close friends and associates of Harvey "Chris" Rosenberg, stealing cars for Rosenberg's chop shop racket, which he operated with Gambino crime family mobster Roy DeMeo. In 1974, aged nineteen, Senter and Testa joined DeMeo's crew, which operated out of the Gemini Lounge, a blue-collar neighborhood bar in Flatlands, Brooklyn. Because they spent so much time together and frequented the Gemini Lounge, the duo became known as the "Gemini twins".

DeMeo, Rosenberg, Senter and Testa became the core of the DeMeo crew, and became notorious for their ruthless violence. The crew was suspected of involvement in 75 to 200 murders throughout the mid-1970s and into the 1980s. Senter gained a reputation for providing the crew with significant revenue from auto theft. Although Senter was a large earner for the Gemini Lounge crew, he was highly disliked by Albert DeMeo, the son of Roy DeMeo. Albert's personal judgment of Senter was that "there was something slick and phony about him".

Roy DeMeo publicly executed college student Dominick Ragucci on April 19, 1979 after mistaking him for a Cuban hitman and the crew subsequently went into hiding, with Senter and Testa fleeing to California. After the murder of Rosenberg, Joseph Testa became Roy’s right hand man. Chris had previously held that position within the crew.

=== Murder of DeMeo ===
On January 10, 1983, Roy DeMeo went to crew member Patrick Testa's bodyshop Patrick Testa Motors Inc. in Canarsie, Brooklyn for a meeting with his men. On January 20, he was found dead in the trunk of his Cadillac Coupe DeVille, a chandelier placed on top of his body. The car was left abandoned at the Varuna Boat Club parking lot. He had been shot multiple times in the head and had a bullet wound in his hand, assumed by law enforcement to be from throwing his hand up to his face in a self-defense reflex when the shots were fired at him. Anthony Gaggi was originally suspected by law enforcement officials of being the one who killed DeMeo. Gaggi was not charged with the crime.

According to former Lucchese acting boss Anthony Casso, DeMeo was killed at Patrick Testa's Canarsie home by Joseph Testa and Senter following an agreement with Casso, who was given the contract by Gambino crime family Boss Paul Castellano and Frank DeCicco after they were unable to kill DeMeo in the fall of 1982. DeMeo was seated, about to receive coffee, when Testa and Senter opened fire. Anthony Gaggi was not present.

According to Sammy 'The Bull' Gravano, Paul Castellano wanted to have the whole DeMeo crew killed because they had all become serial killers, and gave the contract to Frank DeCicco.

Realising how difficult it was going to be, DeCicco went to the Gemini Twins, Testa and Senter, and told them about the contract on them, but promised them they would get a pass (i.e., would be spared) if they killed DeMeo.

After DeMeo was hit, the Gambino family kept their word about sparing Senter and Testa, but didn't want them on their books (i.e., would prefer they no longer be associated with their crime family), which is why they were passed off to Anthony Casso and the Luccheses.

=== Move to the Lucchese family ===
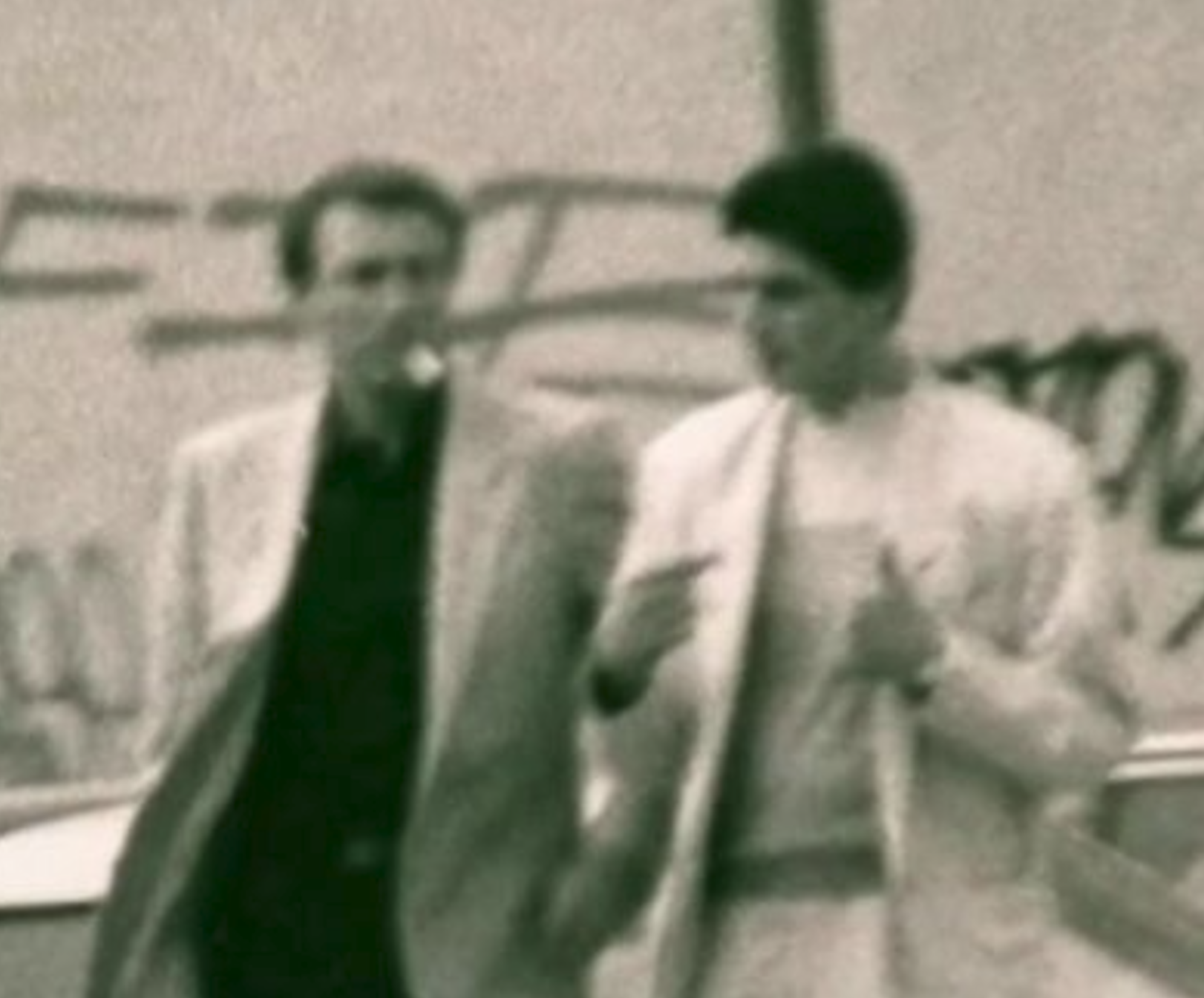
FBI surveillance photo of Senter (right) with Frank Lastorino

On March 30, 1984, Senter and Testa were among 21 Gambino family members and associates charged in a federal racketeering indictment stemming from an investigation into the activities of the DeMeo crew. The 51-count federal indictment includes charges of extortion, theft, prostitution, drug trafficking and 25 murders.

In March 1986, Senter and Testa were acquitted of conspiracy to ship stolen cars; the jury was deadlocked on charges of murder against the pair.

After the murder of Roy DeMeo, Senter and Testa drifted into the Lucchese crime family. According to Casso, they were responsible for the murder on June 13, 1986, of Russian-American gangster Vladimir Reznikov. Reznikov had reportedly threatened the life and family of Marat Balagula, a Ukrainian immigrant who ruled the Russian Mafia in Brighton Beach. Balagula, who was then masterminding a multimillion-dollar gasoline bootlegging operation, had been paying tribute to the Five Families, who regarded him as their biggest moneymaker after drugs.

Senter and Testa were inducted in to the Lucchese family as "made" members during an initiation ceremony conducted by Amuso and Casso at a residence in Canarsie in mid-to-late 1988.

=== Arrest and aftermath ===
During the second trial, Senter and Testa were arrested on drug possession charges after they were discovered using cocaine in a Foley Square Courthouse bathroom in October 1988. On September 14, 1989, Senter and Testa were both sentenced to life imprisonment. Senter served his sentence at the United States Penitentiary (USP), Allenwood, Pennsylvania. Testa served his sentence at the Federal Correctional Institute in Terminal Island for crimes that include multiple murders.

In 1994, Senter's cousin, Dominic Vulpis, who owned a garbage company, discovered that pension contributions were being paid into a Teamsters pension account in Senter's name. A court investigator determined that $30,000 of contributions had been paid into the account over a six-year period, while Senter was in prison on a life sentence. Union officials said Senter could have qualified for a pension of $1,400 a month if the payments by Canarsie Recycling had continued for another five years. Senter will not collect the pension. The Teamsters disqualified Senter as a member and the Pension Fund rejected his pension claim. It is unclear whether Senter's cousin, Dominic Vulpis, or the garbage company he owns, received a refund of the fraudulent contributions.

While imprisoned at the United States Penitentiary, Lompoc, California during the 1990s, Senter was part of an Italian Cultural Club along with several other prominent mobsters, including Carmine Persico, Joseph "J. R." Russo, Michael "Mickey Boy" Paradiso, Nicholas "Nicky Blades" Virgilio, Mark Reiter and Kevin Kelly.

Senter and Testa became eligible for parole after serving ten years of their sentences because the crimes they were convicted of took place prior to 1987, when federal parole was abolished. On June 22, 2022, Senter was granted parole by the United States Parole Commission (USPC) and scheduled for release on June 22, 2024. He was transferred from the United States Penitentiary, Canaan, Pennsylvania to a halfway house in New York in December 2023.

In February 2024, the USPC also ordered the release of Testa. He was paroled on April 30, 2024. Due to ill health, he was not required to reside in a halfway house.

Testa retired to Henderson, Nevada after his release, where he died from cancer on January 26, 2026, aged 71, after suffering years of health issues.
