= John Paul Jones Park =

Public park in Brooklyn, New York

Coordinates: 40.611°N 74.034°W

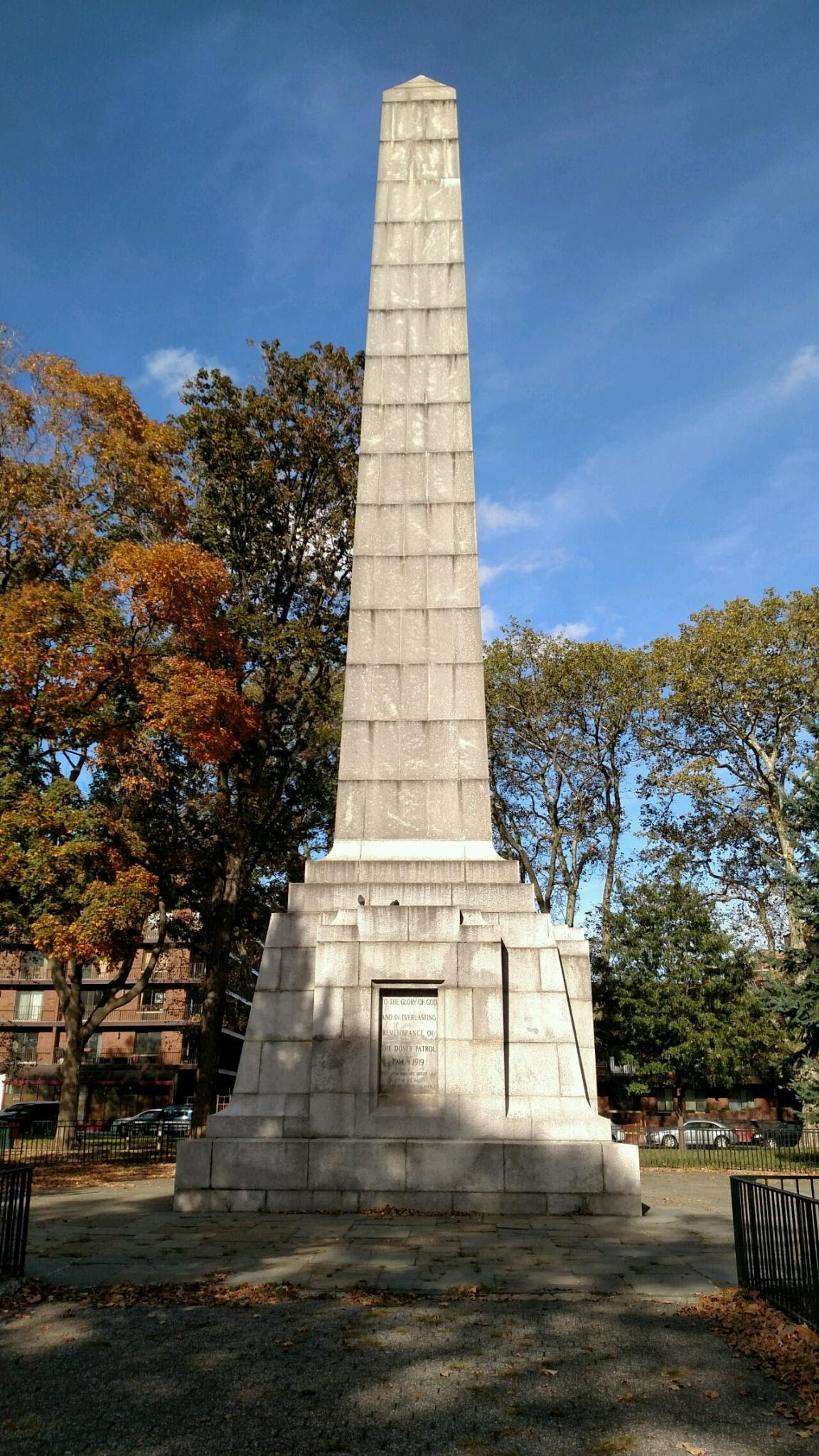
Dover Patrol Naval War Memorial

John Paul Jones Park is a public park located in Fort Hamilton, Bay Ridge, Brooklyn. The park borders Shore Road, Fourth Avenue, 101st Street, and Fort Hamilton Parkway. The park is managed by the New York City Department of Parks and Recreation, which acquired the property from the city of Brooklyn in 1897.

John Paul Jones Park is named after the American patriot and naval commander of the same name, who was known for his leadership in the American Revolution. He is often referred to as "the father of the Navy."

John Paul Jones Park is home to several memorials from various events in American history:

- Rodman gun: a massive, black, twenty-inch bore that was created in 1864 by artilleryman Thomas Jackson Rodman. It was originally situated in Fort Pitt, Pennsylvania, but was presented to the park by the United States Military in 1900. Today it dominates the park along with cannonballs that surrounds the landscape and is part of the Civil War Memorial.
- Revolutionary War Memorial: contains a bronze tablet that is inscribed into a granite boulder. This plaque was granted by the Long Island Society of the Daughters of the American Revolution in 1916 to commemorate the first resistance made to British arms in New York in August 1776.
- Dover Patrol Naval War Memorial: features a monument that was donated by Sir Aston Webb in 1931, from England after World War I. It serves as a dedication to the Dover Patrol for its service and comradeship in the American Naval Force in Europe during the first World War. The monument has a pyramid-shaped copper capstone at the top of the obelisk.
- In addition to these memorials is a 70 foot tall flag pole that once belonged to a Navy destroyer. It was added to the park in 1980 alongside a plaque that reads "in honor of John Paul Jones, the father of the Navy."
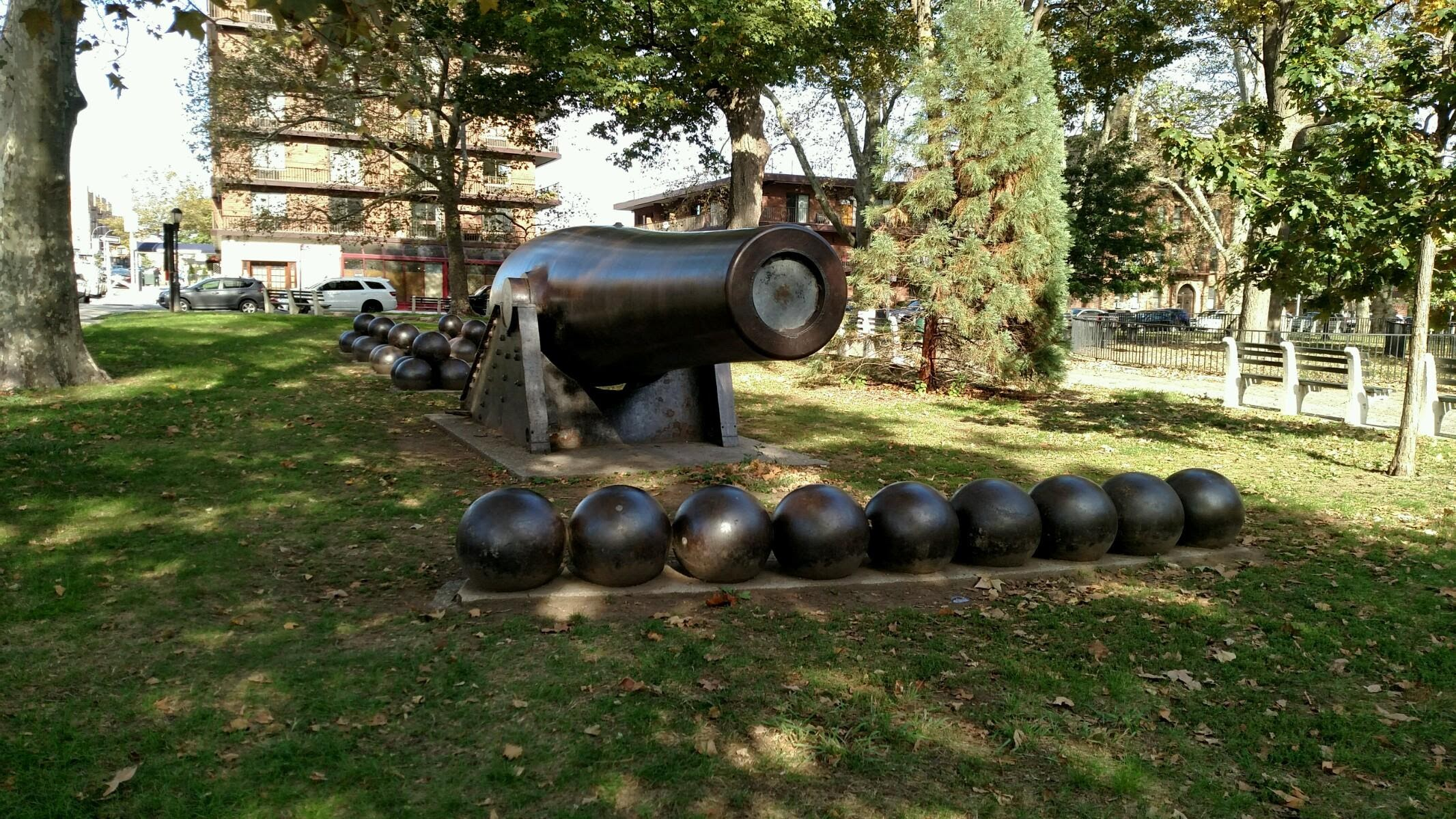
Rodman gun

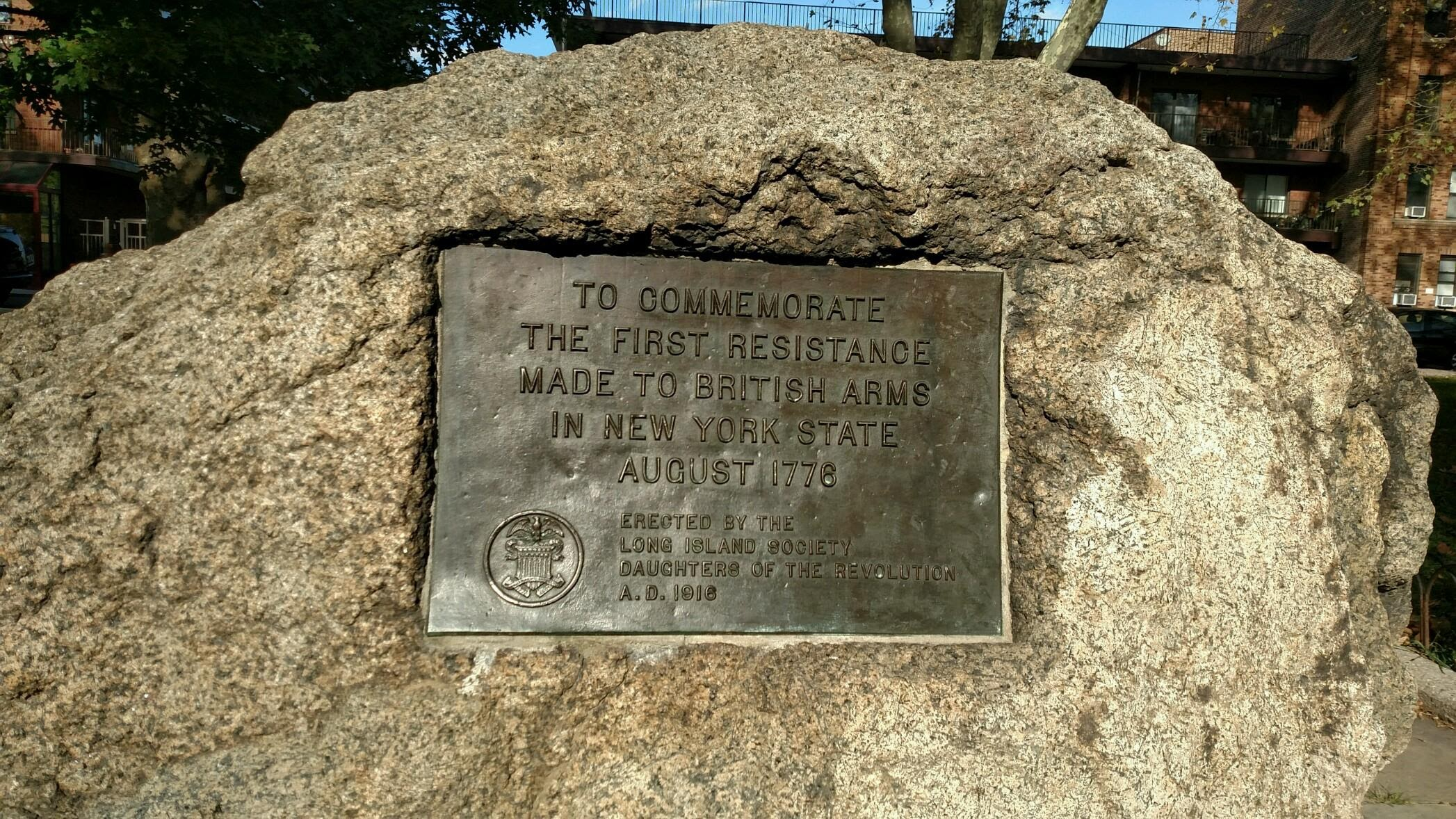
Revolutionary War Memorial

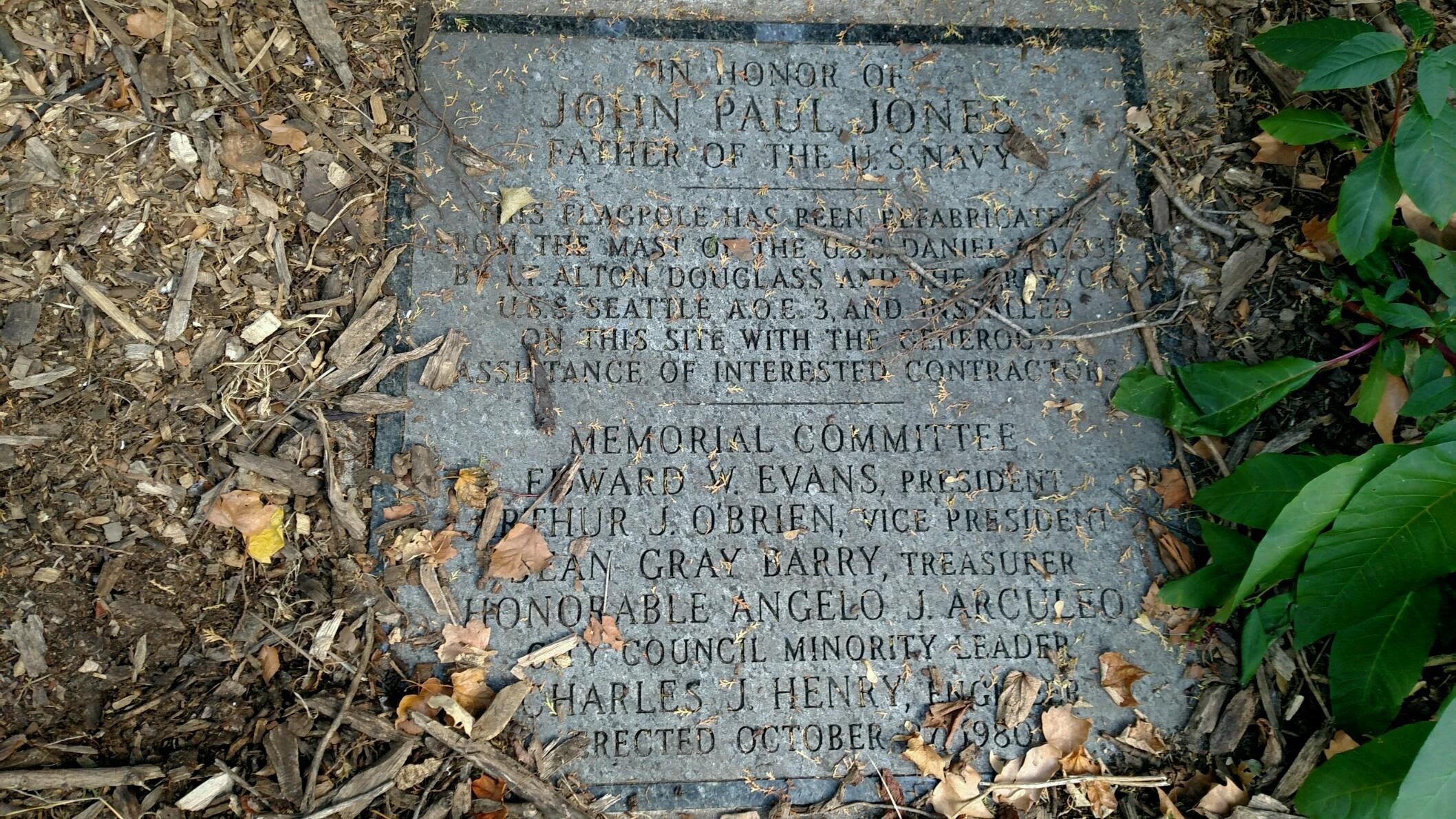
Plaque honoring John Paul Jones

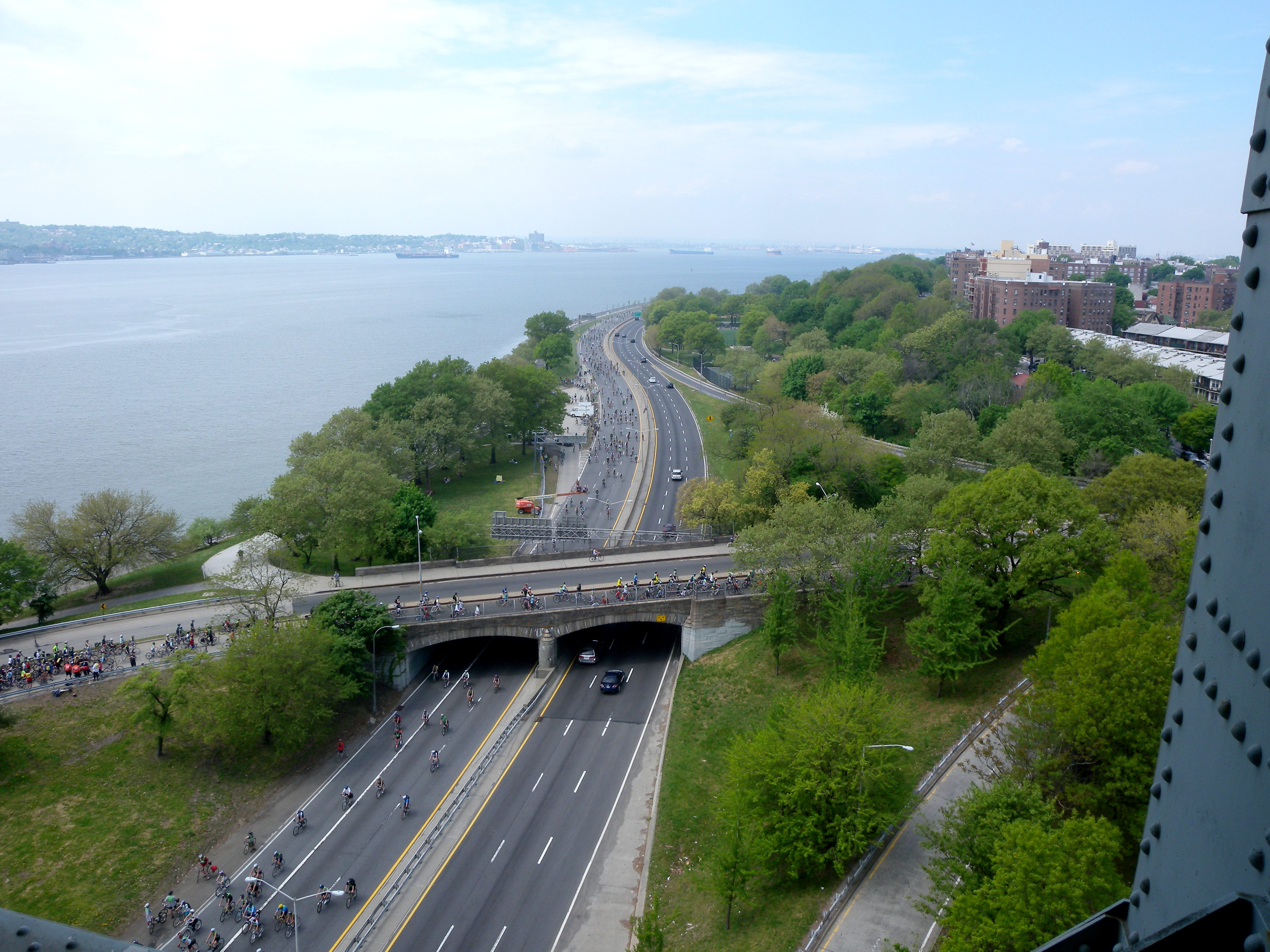
From above
