= Ernest Volkman =

American journalist and author (1940–2025)

- Born: Ernest Wyman Volkman; December 31, 1940; Bronx, New York City, U.S.
- Died: April 11, 2025 (aged 84); Agawam, Massachusetts, U.S.
- Occupations: Crime journalist; author; organized crime expert; columnist
- Years active: 1964–2025

Ernest Wyman Volkman (December 31, 1940 – April 11, 2025) was an American author, investigative reporter and journalist who wrote about war, espionage, and the criminal underworld. Volkman was a 1959 graduate of Walt Whitman High School in South Huntington, New York, and attended Hofstra University.

A U.S. Army veteran, Volkman was also a military intelligence specialist and wrote many books on the subjects of spies and spying.

At the time of his death on April 11, 2025, at the age of 84, Volkman lived together with his wife Beverly. He had two adult children: son Eric and daughter Michelle.
