= Loyalty & Betrayal: The Story of the American Mob =

- Genre: Documentary
- Written by: Nicholas Pileggi; Bill Couturié; Robert Malloy
- Directed by: Gary Weimberg (part 1); Bill Jersey (part 2)
- Starring: Mickey Featherstone; Phil Leonetti; Dominick Montiglio
- Narrated by: Ron Silver
- Music by: Todd Boekelheide
- Country of origin: United States
- Original language: English

Production
- Executive producers: Bill Couturié; Nicholas Pileggi
- Producers: Bill Jersey; Janet Mercer
- Cinematography: Bill Jersey
- Editors: Gary Weimberg (part 1); Jay Hansell (part 2)
- Running time: 240 minutes (2 parts)
- Production companies: Pileggi/Couturié Productions; Quest Productions

Original release
- Network: Fox
- Release: July 25 – July 26, 1994

Loyalty & Betrayal: The Story of the American Mob is a 1994 American documentary television film. First broadcast in 1994 on FOX, the two-part mini-series charts the history of organized crime in America from Al Capone to John Gotti. Interviews are given by relatives and others, such as Bee Sedway, widow of Moe Sedway, detailing life in a crime family and what the mobsters were like. It also discusses the various illegal businesses the mobsters ran and legal ones it tried to influence, such as politics, government and entertainment.

== Cast ==
- Billy Beattie as himself
- Mickey Featherstone as himself
- Doug Le Vien as himself
- Phil Leonetti as himself
- Jerry Maranzano as himself
- John Miller as himself
- Dominick Montiglio as himself
- Frank Ragano as himself
- Art Ruffels as himself
- Ralph Salerno as himself
- Bee Sedway as herself
- Ron Silver (narration)
- Ed Becker as himself

== Production ==
Produced by Bill Jersey and Janet Mercer, directed by Gary Weimberg and Bill Jersey, written by Nicholas Pileggi, Bill Couturié, and Robert Molloy. Original music by Todd Boekelheide.

== See also ==
- List of American films of 1994
