= Roy DeMeo =

American gangster (1940–1983)

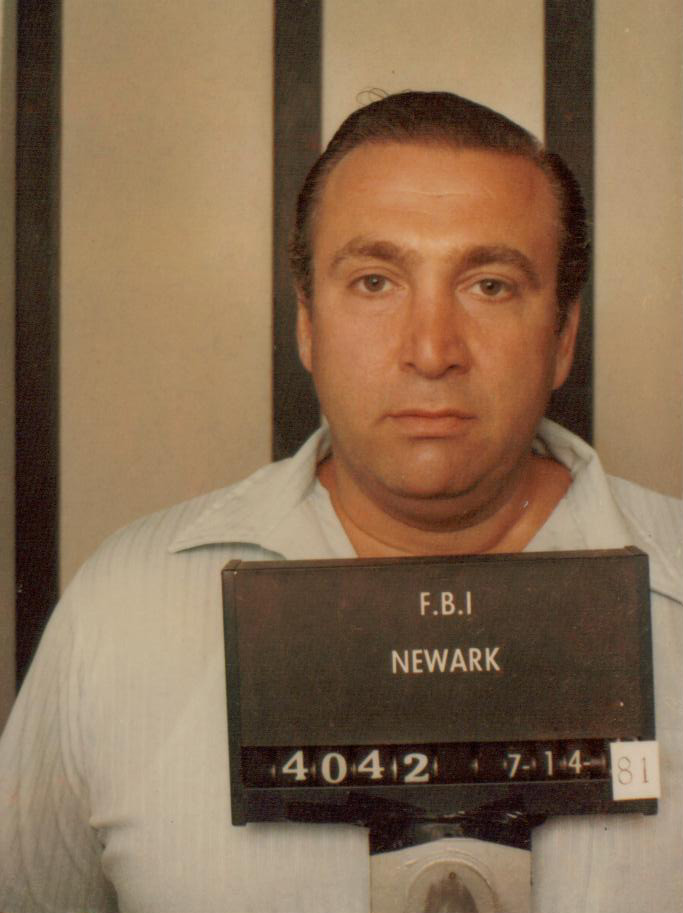
- FBI mugshot of DeMeo, July 14, 1981
- Born: Roy Albert DeMeo; September 7, 1940; New York City, New York, U.S.
- Disappeared: January 10, 1983
- Died: January 10, 1983 (aged 42); New York City, New York, U.S.
- Cause of death: Gunshot wounds
- Body discovered: January 20, 1983; New York, New York, U.S.
- Resting place: St. John Cemetery, New York, New York, U.S.
- Other names: Roy DiMare, Steven DiMare, John Holland
- Occupation: Mobster
- Spouse: Gladys Rosamond Brittain (m. 1960)
- Children: 3
- Allegiance: Gambino crime family

Roy Albert DeMeo (/dəˈmeɪoʊ/; September 7, 1940 – January 10, 1983) was an American mobster in the Gambino crime family of New York City. He headed a group known as the "DeMeo crew", which consisted of approximately twenty associates involved in murder, car theft, drug dealing, prostitution and pornography. The DeMeo crew became notorious for the large number of murders they committed and for the routine they employed to dispose of bodies, which became known as "the Gemini Method". The crew is believed to be responsible for up to 200 murders, many of which were committed by DeMeo himself.

== Early life ==
Roy DeMeo was born on September 7, 1940, in the Flatlands neighborhood of Brooklyn in New York City. He was raised in a working-class Italian immigrant family originating from Formia in the region of Lazio. The fourth of five children of Antonio Joseph "Anthony" DeMeo, a laundry company deliveryman, and Eleanor DeMeo (née Colarullo), a housewife, Roy graduated from James Madison High School in 1959, during which time he began earning money as a loanshark. Economist Walter Block and future senator Bernie Sanders were among DeMeo's graduating year classmates.

Between the ages of 15 and 22, DeMeo worked at a local grocery store, where he trained as an apprentice butcher. His older brother Anthony Frank "Chubby" DeMeo, a United States Marine Corps corporal, was killed in action during the Korean War on April 23, 1951, aged 20. DeMeo's father died of a heart attack on December 12, 1960, and his mother subsequently returned to Italy with Roy's youngest brother to live with relatives near Naples.

== Criminal career ==
=== Gambino family ===
DeMeo was initially an associate of the Brooklyn faction of the Lucchese crime family, which controlled towing companies, junkyards and car theft operations in Flatlands and Canarsie. Anthony "Nino" Gaggi, a soldier in the Gambino crime family, noticed DeMeo in 1966 and told him that he could make even more money with his successful business if he shifted his allegiance to the Gambinos. Through the late 1960s, DeMeo's organized crime prospects increased on two fronts: he continued in the loansharking business with Gaggi and began developing a crew of young men involved in car theft. It was this collective of criminals that became known both in the underworld and in law enforcement circles as the "DeMeo crew."

The first member of the DeMeo crew was sixteen-year-old Harvey "Chris" Rosenberg, who met DeMeo in 1966 when he was dealing cannabis at a Canarsie gas station. DeMeo helped Rosenberg grow his business by loaning him money so that he could deal in larger amounts. By 1972, Rosenberg had introduced his friends to DeMeo and they began working for him as well. Additional members of the crew came to include Joseph and Patrick Testa, Anthony Senter, Richard and Frederick DiNome, Henry Borelli, Joseph "Dracula" Guglielmo (DeMeo's cousin), and later, Vito Arena and Carlo Profeta.

Meanwhile, in 1972, DeMeo joined a Brooklyn credit union and quickly obtained a position on the board of directors. He utilized his position to launder money earned through his illegal ventures. DeMeo also introduced colleagues at the credit union to a lucrative side-business, laundering the money of drug dealers he had become acquainted with. He also built up his loansharking business with funds stolen from credit union reserves.

DeMeo's collection of loanshark customers, while still primarily those in the car industry, soon included other businesses such as a dentist's office, an abortion clinic, restaurants and flea markets. He was also listed as an employee for a Brooklyn company called S & C Sportswear Corporation. DeMeo frequently told his neighbors that he worked in construction, food retailing and the used car business. Bonanno family underboss Salvatore Vitale claimed to the Federal Bureau of Investigation (FBI) that in 1974 he was ordered to deliver the corpse of a man who had just been murdered to a garage in Queens so that it could be disposed of by DeMeo.

In late 1974, a conflict escalated between the DeMeo crew and Andrei Katz, a young auto repair shop owner who was partners with DeMeo in a stolen car ring. In January 1975, Katz visited the Brooklyn District Attorney's Office and voluntarily provided information pertaining to Rosenberg's involvement in car theft. DeMeo learned about the meeting immediately afterward from a New York City Police Department (NYPD) auto crimes detective on his payroll. He ordered Borelli to contact a female acquaintance, Babette Judith Questel, about being used as bait. In May 1975, Katz appeared before a Brooklyn grand jury and divulged what he knew about the DeMeo crew's illegal activities.

On June 13, 1975, Questel was used to successfully lure Katz to her apartment for what he thought was a date, where upon arrival he was immediately abducted by members of the DeMeo crew. He was then taken to the meat department of a supermarket in Rockaway Beach, where he was stabbed multiple times with a butcher knife. After being decapitated, Katz' head was then put through a machine normally used for compacting cardboard boxes, where it was crushed. His dismembered body parts were wrapped in plastic bags and deposited into the supermarket's dumpster, where they were discovered days later when a pedestrian walking his dog spotted one of Katz' legs lying on a curb near the store. Police reported to the press that a grisly, brutal killing had occurred, but that was the extent of the information given. The body was identified as Katz' two days later through the use of dental records.

=== Gemini Method ===
As the 1970s progressed, DeMeo cultivated his followers into a crew experienced with the process of murdering and dismembering victims. With the exception of killings intended to send a message to any who would hinder their criminal activities, or murders that presented no other alternative, a set method of execution was established by the DeMeo crew to ensure that victims would be dispatched quickly and then made to disappear. The style of execution was dubbed the "Gemini Method" after the Gemini Lounge, a bar which served as the crew's primary hangout, as well as the site where most of their victims were killed.

The process of the Gemini Method, as revealed by multiple crew members and associates who became government witnesses in the early 1980s, was to lure the victim through the side door of the lounge and into an apartment in the back portion of the building. At this point, a crew member – almost always DeMeo according to crew member-turned-government witness Frederick DiNome – would approach with a silenced pistol in one hand and a towel in the other, shooting the victim in the head then wrapping the towel around the victim's head wound like a turban to stanch the blood flow. Immediately after, another member of the crew, originally Rosenberg, would stab the victim in the heart to prevent more blood from pumping out of the gunshot wound. By then, the victim would be dead, at which point the body would be stripped of clothing and dragged into a bathroom, where the remaining blood drained out or congealed within the body. This was to eliminate the messiness of the next step, when crew members would place the body onto plastic sheets laid out in the main room and proceed to dismember it, cutting off the arms, legs and head.

Following dismemberment, the body parts would then be put into bags, placed in cardboard boxes and sent to the Fountain Avenue landfill in Brooklyn. So many tons of garbage were dropped each day at the landfill that it would be nearly impossible for the bodies to be discovered. During the initial stages of an early 1980s investigation targeting the DeMeo crew, a plan by authorities to excavate sections of the dump to locate remains was aborted when it was deemed too costly and unlikely to locate any meaningful evidence. The landfill, opposite the Starrett City Apartment Complex in East New York, was closed in 1985, capped over and converted into parkland.

Some victims were killed in other ways for varying reasons. At times, suspected informants or those who committed an act of disrespect against a member of the crew or their superiors had their bodies left in the streets to serve as a message and warning. There were also occasions where it would not be possible to lure the intended victim into the Gemini Lounge, in which case other locations would have to be used. A cabin cruiser owned by Richard DiNome was used on at least one occasion to dispose of remains at sea.

=== Further criminal career ===
In the latter half of 1975, DeMeo became a silent partner in a peep show and prostitution establishment in Bricktown, New Jersey, after the owner of the business became unable to pay his loansharking debts. DeMeo also began dealing in bestiality and child pornography, which he sold to his New Jersey establishment as well as connections in Rhode Island. When Gaggi found out about DeMeo's involvement in such taboo material, he demanded that DeMeo stop under the threat of death. However, DeMeo defied Gaggi and continued the practice. Gaggi did not retaliate, and, according to his nephew Dominick Montiglio, the subject was never mentioned again as long as DeMeo continued making payments to Gaggi.

DeMeo also dealt in narcotics despite the Gambino family strictly forbidding such activity; he financed a major operation importing Colombian cannabis, which was unloaded from an offshore freighter and sold at various auto shops in Canarsie, and also sold cocaine out of the Gemini Lounge.

As 1975 drew to a close, DeMeo was the subject of Internal Revenue Service (IRS) investigations into his income. Months earlier, DeMeo's credit union had been pushed into insolvency as a result of the plundering of its finances by DeMeo and his crew; DeMeo quit the credit union as a result. Before an indictment could be handed down against him, DeMeo utilized false affidavits from businesses owned by friends and acquaintances claiming he was on their payrolls as an employee. These affidavits served to account for some of his income, allowing him to reach a settlement with the IRS.

DeMeo's sources of income, as well as his crew, continued to grow. By July 1976 he added a used car firm called Team Auto Wholesalers to his loanshark customers. The owner of Team Auto, Matthew Rega, also purchased stolen vehicles from the DeMeo crew and sold them off at a New Jersey car lot that he owned. DeMeo also involved himself with hijacking delivery trucks from John F. Kennedy International Airport. His crew now included Edward "Danny" Grillo, a hijacker who had just been released from prison.

In the fall of 1976, the Gambino family went through a massive change when its longtime boss and namesake, Carlo Gambino, died of natural causes. Paul Castellano, Gambino's cousin and the head of the family's Brooklyn faction, was named as his successor, while Aniello Dellacroce, the head of the Manhattan faction, retained the position of underboss. The implications of this were twofold for DeMeo. Gaggi was elevated to the position of caporegime (captain), taking over the crew of men Castellano previously headed. This promotion was beneficial for DeMeo, whose mentor was now even closer to the family leadership. Another advantage was that with Gambino deceased, new associates would be eligible for official membership into the family.

Castellano did not immediately "open the books" for new members, however, opting instead to promote existing members and reshuffle his captains to new crews. He also allegedly opposed the idea of DeMeo being "made", looking down on street-level members and instead involving himself in white-collar crime. Additionally, Castellano felt DeMeo was uncontrollable. Gaggi's attempts at persuading Castellano to initiate DeMeo were continually rejected. By 1977, DeMeo became distraught by this state of affairs and searched for opportunities that would ensure larger returns for his superiors.

=== The Westies alliance and Rosenberg ===
DeMeo secured his induction into the Gambino family by forming an alliance with an Irish-American gang known as the Westies, based in Hell's Kitchen. The leader of a rival Irish gang, Mickey Spillane, was causing delays for the construction of the Jacob K. Javits Convention Center, much to the frustration of Castellano, who had an interest in the project. After the unsolved murder of Spillane in May 1977, Westies leader James "Jimmy" Coonan assumed control of the Irish mob rackets on Manhattan's West Side.

DeMeo, sensing an opportunity to create a vast source of income for the Gambino family, persuaded Gaggi to consider a partnership with the Westies. Shortly afterwards, Coonan and his second-in-command Mickey Featherstone were called to a meeting with Castellano, in which they agreed to become a de facto arm of the family and share ten percent of all profits. In exchange, the Westies would be privy to several lucrative union deals and take on murder contracts for the family.

It was his pivotal role in the Gambino–Westie alliance that reportedly convinced Castellano to give DeMeo his "button," or formally induct him into the family. DeMeo was made in mid-1977 and put in charge of handling all family business with the Westies. He was ordered to get permission before committing any murders and to avoid drug dealing. His crew, however, continued to sell large amounts of cocaine, cannabis and a variety of narcotic pills. DeMeo also continued to commit unsanctioned killings, such as the 1977 double homicide of Johnathan Quinn, a car thief suspected of cooperating with law enforcement, and Cherie Golden, Quinn's nineteen-year-old girlfriend. The DeMeo crew dumped the bodies in locations where they would be discovered to serve as a warning against cooperation with authorities.

In 1978, Frederick DiNome, previously DeMeo's chauffeur, joined the crew. DeMeo and his crew murdered Grillo, who had fallen into heavy debt with DeMeo and was believed to be becoming susceptible to police coercion. Grillo, who was dismembered and disposed of like many of the crew's victims, was the first known occurrence of internal crew discipline.

The next member to be killed was Rosenberg, who had set up a drug deal with a Cuban man living in Florida and then murdered him and his associates when they traveled to New York to complete the sale. The Cuban had connections with a Cuban drug cartel, raising the possibility of violence between the Gambino family and the Cubans unless Rosenberg was dealt with. DeMeo was ordered to kill Rosenberg but stalled for weeks.

During this period, DeMeo committed his most public murder. The victim was a college student with no criminal ties named Dominick Ragucci, who was paying for his tuition as a door-to-door salesman. DeMeo saw Ragucci parked outside his home in Massapequa Park, Long Island, and assumed he was a Cuban assassin. DeMeo and crew members Joseph Guglielmo and Frederick DiNome pursued Ragucci in a seven-mile car chase on Route 110 through Amityville and Farmingdale, after which the student was shot to death by DeMeo. After returning home and gathering his family, DeMeo drove them out of Long Island and left them at a hotel in upstate New York for two weeks. According to his son Albert, DeMeo broke down crying when he discovered he had murdered an innocent teenager and did not eat for several days afterward. The public execution also put a strain on DeMeo's relationship with his wife Gladys, who had previously been able to ignore her husband's criminal activities.

Infuriated by the Ragucci murder, Gaggi ordered DeMeo to kill Rosenberg before there were any other innocent victims. On May 11, 1979, Rosenberg reported to the Gemini Lounge for the crew's usual Friday night meeting. Shortly after his arrival, DeMeo fired a single bullet into the unsuspecting Rosenberg's head. The usually ice-cold DeMeo hesitated when the still-living Rosenberg managed to rise off the floor and onto one knee, but Senter then moved in and finished him off with four shots to the head.

Unlike Grillo, Rosenberg's body was not dismembered or made to disappear. The Cubans had demanded that his murder make the newspapers. DeMeo's men placed his body in his car and left it on the side of Cross Bay Boulevard, near the Gateway National Wildlife Refuge in Broad Channel, Queens, to be found. Albert later recounted that Rosenberg's murder deeply affected his father, and that when DeMeo came home after the killing, he went into his study room and didn't emerge for two days. After the murder, DeMeo spent six weeks hiding out with Guglielmo in a safe house near 42nd Street in Times Square, growing a full beard and disguising himself with a baseball cap and sunglasses when out in public.

=== Empire Boulevard operation ===
As 1979 continued, DeMeo began to expand his business activities, in particular his car theft operation, which soon became the largest in New York history. Dubbed the Empire Boulevard Operation by the FBI, it consisted of hundreds of stolen cars being shipped from Port Newark to Kuwait and Puerto Rico. DeMeo put together a group of five active partners in the operation, all of whom earned approximately $30,000 a week each in profit. Aside from stolen cars, DeMeo was also shipping cigarettes and pornographic magazines to the Middle East.

Aside from the active partners, crew members and other associates performed the actual theft of the automobiles off the streets of New York. Among these associates was Vito Arena, a long-time car thief and armed robber who began working for DeMeo in 1978 after murdering his old partner. Like DiNome, Arena became closely involved with the DeMeo crew by the end of the 1970s. In 1979, the Empire Boulevard Operation was nearly stopped by a legitimate car dealer who threatened to inform police. The car dealer was murdered along with an uninvolved acquaintance before he could provide authorities with information.

=== Eppolito murders ===
In late 1979, DeMeo and Gaggi became involved in a conflict with James Eppolito and James Eppolito Jr., two made Gambino members in Gaggi's crew. They were the paternal uncle and cousin, respectively, of corrupt former NYPD detective Louis Eppolito, whose father, Ralph – brother of James Sr. – was also a made member of the Gambino family.

The elder Eppolito met with Castellano and accused DeMeo and Gaggi of drug dealing, which carried the penalty of death. Castellano, to whom Gaggi was a close ally, sided against Eppolito and gave Gaggi permission to do what he pleased. Gaggi and DeMeo shot both Eppolitos to death in the younger Eppolito's car en route to the Gemini Lounge on October 1, 1979. A witness driving by right as the shots were fired within the parked car alerted a nearby police officer, who arrested Gaggi after a shootout between the two that left Gaggi with a bullet wound in his neck. Since DeMeo had split up with Gaggi as they left the scene, he was not arrested or identified by the witness.

Gaggi was charged with murder and the attempted murder of a police officer, but through jury tampering was convicted only of assault and given a five- to fifteen-year sentence in federal prison. DeMeo murdered the witness shortly after Gaggi's sentencing in March 1980. The Empire Boulevard Operation had continued to expand into 1980 until the warehouse serving as its headquarters was raided by agents from the Newark branch of the FBI that summer. Henry Borelli and Frederick DiNome were arrested in May 1981 for their roles in the operation, but there was not enough evidence to arrest any of the other active partners. DeMeo ordered Borelli and DiNome to plead guilty to the charges in hopes that it would stop any further investigations into his activities.

=== Downfall and murder ===
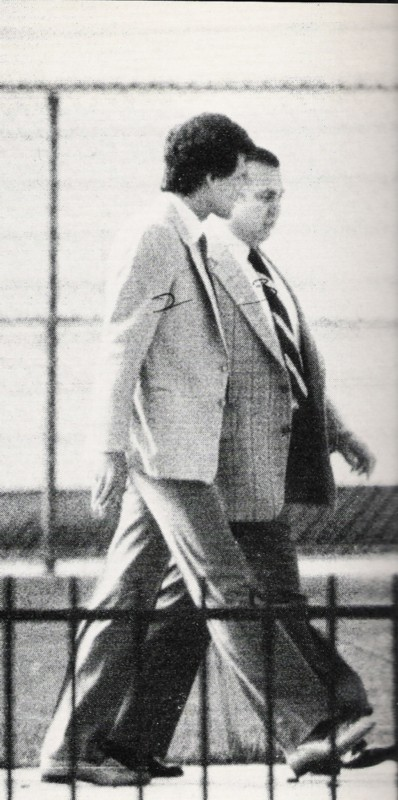
DeMeo (right) in a 1982 surveillance photo with Joseph Testa (left), who prosecutors described as DeMeo's "right hand man."

By 1982, the FBI was investigating the enormous number of missing and murdered persons who were linked to DeMeo or who had last been seen entering the Gemini Lounge. Arena began cooperating with a state and federal task force investigating the DeMeo crew after he was arrested on June 4, 1982, for a string of robberies. Fearing that they would be arrested as a result of Arena's testimony, DeMeo and members of his crew went into hiding during the summer and fall of 1982. DeMeo eventually emerged from hiding to consult with lawyers as he anticipated an indictment stemming from the Southern District of New York's investigation into his crew's activities.

Due to Arena's knowledge of the chain of command in the Gambino family, Gaggi and Castellano became concerned upon learning that he had turned state's evidence, and Castellano began conspiring to have DeMeo killed. Around this time, an FBI bug in the home of Gambino soldier Angelo Ruggiero picked up a conversation between him and Gene Gotti, a brother of John Gotti. In the conversation, it was discussed that Castellano had put out a hit on DeMeo, but was having difficulty finding someone willing to do the job. Gene mentioned that John was wary of taking the contract, as DeMeo had an "army of killers" around him. It was also mentioned that, at that time, John had killed fewer than ten people, while DeMeo had killed thirty-seven that they had known about. According to mob informant Sammy Gravano, the contract was eventually given to Frank DeCicco, but DeCicco and his crew could not reach DeMeo either. DeCicco allegedly handed the job to DeMeo's own men.

DeMeo's son Albert wrote that in his final days, DeMeo was depressed and paranoid, aware that he would soon be killed. In the winter of 1982–83, he rarely left his mansion and wore a leather jacket with a sawn-off shotgun concealed underneath whenever he ventured outside. DeMeo considered faking his own death by having his son shoot him and laying low. On January 10, 1983, DeMeo went to crew member Patrick Testa's house for a meeting with his men. That night, he failed to attend his daughter Dione's birthday party, which caused his family to be suspicious. Albert later found DeMeo's personal belongings such as his watch, wallet and ring in his study room, along with a Catholic pamphlet.

Ten days later, on January 20, 1983, DeMeo's Cadillac Coupe DeVille was discovered in the parking lot of the Varuna Boat Club in Sheepshead Bay, Brooklyn. The car was towed to a nearby police station, where it was searched by detectives in the NYPD's Organized Crime Control Bureau. DeMeo's partially frozen body was found in the trunk with a chandelier placed on top of it. He had been shot multiple times in the head and had a bullet wound in his hand, assumed by law enforcement to be a defensive wound caused when his killers opened fire on him.

The task force investigating the DeMeo crew theorized that DeMeo was set up in a similar manner to how he set up Rosenberg, and that Gaggi, Testa and Senter were present when he was killed. Albert also believed that his father was killed by members of his own crew. In April 1984, Colombo family soldier Ralph Scopo was overheard on a wiretap explaining to an associate that DeMeo had been killed by his own family because they suspected that he would not be able to stand up to legal charges that resulted from the Empire Boulevard Operation. According to Scopo, Castellano also "had to put him away" because DeMeo "was crazy and had cast-iron balls."

Lucchese family underboss-turned-government witness Anthony "Gaspipe" Casso claimed that Castellano ordered John Gotti and Frank DeCicco to kill DeMeo, but they were unable to get close to him. DeCicco suggested Casso could do it, as he knew Senter and Joseph Testa well. Casso ordered them to kill DeMeo, assuring them that there would be no retribution and that afterwards they would join him in the Lucchese family. DeMeo visited the home of Patrick Testa to collect some money he was owed. Joseph and Senter were both there. As DeMeo sat down and waited for a cup of coffee, they shot him dead.

According to Casso, Castellano ordering DeMeo's execution sealed Castellano's own fate, as Gotti and DeCicco were planning to kill him, and would ultimately do so on 16 December 1985. Casso said they would never have dared to move against Castellano while DeMeo was still alive.

== Aftermath ==
In 1984, a 78-count indictment was filed against twenty-four defendants, including Castellano, Gaggi and the surviving members of the DeMeo crew. The charges related to car theft, racketeering and drug trafficking. Castellano was indicted for ordering DeMeo's murder, as well as a host of other crimes, but was killed in December 1985 while out on bail in the middle of the first trial. John Gotti, who ordered the hit, became the new boss of the Gambino family. Gaggi became the lead defendant after Castellano's death, but himself soon died of natural causes.

In March 1986, six members of the DeMeo crew were convicted, with Borelli and one other defendant found guilty of two counts of murder. They were found guilty of murdering two people who threatened to expose the car theft ring. In June 1989, nine additional members, including Anthony Senter and Joseph Testa, were convicted. At sentencing, Senter and Testa were given life sentences for murder with an additional twenty years for racketeering. Prosecutor William Mack Jr. stated that the "Roy DeMeo Crew is the most violent crew ever prosecuted in federal court, as far as my knowledge," and that DeMeo "engaged in wholesale slaughter."

The convictions were secured in large part by testimony of former members Frederick DiNome and Dominick Montiglio, as well as Vito Arena. Montiglio turned when he learned that Gaggi, his uncle, had put a contract on his life, and was placed in the witness protection program for twenty years for his testimony. Richard DiNome was murdered in 1984. Frederick DiNome died in what was ruled as a suicide in 1989. Arena left New York that same year after serving six years of an eighteen-year sentence after his testimony. He was killed in a 1991 robbery in Texas. The Gemini Lounge later became a storefront church.

DeMeo is the subject of the 1992 book Murder Machine by Jerry Capeci and Gene Mustaine. DeMeo's son Albert also wrote a book about his life, For the Sins of My Father, published in 2002. DeMeo is portrayed by Michael A. Miranda in the film Boss of Bosses (2001). Ray Liotta plays DeMeo in the 2012 film adaptation of Anthony Bruno's book about Richard Kuklinski, The Iceman: The True Story of a Cold-Blooded Killer. Danny A. Abeckaser plays DeMeo in the film Inside Man (2023).

== Personal life ==
"I grew up in a very normal household. Now I read this about my Dad, and it really upsets me. This was cathartic. I went into this book with noble intentions, but I realise now that I can't fix my father's image. He did kill, I know those things. I can't fool myself. But I can show that there was another side to him: a father who took care of his family." – Albert DeMeo in 2002

DeMeo married Gladys Rosamond Brittain (1939–2002) in 1960. In 1966, he moved into a custom-built home in Massapequa Park, where he lived with his wife and three children. The couple had two daughters and a son.

DeMeo was raised Catholic but stopped practicing the religion in later life. His children were raised in his wife's Lutheran faith. By all accounts, he was a devoted family man. Describing growing up, Albert recalled, "I grew up in a very normal household."

Albert became a stockbroker but suffered a nervous breakdown after the release of Murder Machine in 1992. He was later diagnosed with post-traumatic stress disorder.

== List of murders allegedly committed by the DeMeo crew ==
Name	Date	Reason
Paul Rothenberg	July 29, 1973	Rothenberg (43), a pornographer and extortion victim, was shot twice in the head in an alley in Flower Hill by DeMeo and Gaggi after being suspected of cooperating with authorities.
Joseph Umile	December 4, 1973	Umile (41) was shot four times in the chest and once in the head by DeMeo and dumped onto a street in Flatlands, Brooklyn, following a dispute over money.
Andrei Katz	June 13, 1975	Katz (22) was kidnapped in Manhattan and taken to Pantry Pride Supermarket in Rockaway Beach, Queens, where he was stabbed to death and dismembered by the DeMeo crew after he testified before a grand jury the previous month.
Joseph Brocchini	May 20, 1976	Brocchini (43), a soldier in the Lucchese family, was shot five times in the head by DeMeo and Henry Borelli inside of his office at Parliament Auto Sales in Woodside, Queens, as a result of a previous altercation with DeMeo.
Vincent Governara	June 12–19, 1976	Governara (34) was shot multiple times in Bensonhurst, Brooklyn, by DeMeo and Gaggi as revenge for breaking Gaggi's nose in a fistfight twelve years earlier; Governara had made lewd, disrespectful comments to Gaggi's sister-in-law, precipitating the fight. He died in hospital a week after being shot.
George Byrum	July 13, 1976	Byrum (42) was killed by DeMeo for tipping off thieves who burglarized Gaggi's vacation home; he was shot in the face and stabbed eleven times in a motel room at the Ocean Shore Motel in Sunny Isles Beach, Florida.
Charles "Ruby" Stein	May 5, 1977	Stein (61), a loan shark and associate of the Genovese and Colombo families, killed by DeMeo crew member Danny Grillo and Jimmy Coonan at the 596 Club in Hell's Kitchen after Coonan fell into Stein's debt; Grillo shot Stein six times. His body was dismembered by members of the Westies gang and disposed of in the East River. Stein's torso washed ashore at Rockaway Beach, Queens, on May 15, 1977.
Mickey Spillane	May 13, 1977	Spillane (44), an Irish mob boss, was shot five times and killed outside his apartment building in Woodside, Queens, by DeMeo and Grillo as a favor to Coonan.
Jerome Hofaker	June 16, 1977	Hofaker (23) was shot five times and killed by Anthony Senter and Joseph Testa outside his girlfriend's house in Canarsie, Brooklyn, for getting into a fight with Joey's brother Dennis.
John Quinn and Cherie Golden	July 20, 1977	Quinn (34) was shot once in the back of the head with a .32 caliber handgun after he testified before a grand jury. His girlfriend, Cherie Golden (19), was shot three times in the head with a .38 caliber handgun. Quinn's body was found the same night it was dumped along a road in Dongan Hills, Staten Island, while Golden's was found in a car in Gerritsen Beach, Brooklyn, on July 24, 1977.
Daniel Conti	October 29, 1977	Conti (28) was shot and killed by DeMeo and Conti's brother-in-law Peter LaFroscia after concerns he would cooperate with law enforcement after an investigation was opened into a failed hijacking attempt involving the DeMeo crew. His body was discovered in the trunk of an automobile that was being stripped for parts in Crown Heights, Brooklyn. Conti was shot in the eye and the neck.
John Costello	November 1977	Costello (20) was shot several times in the head by DeMeo and LaFroscia after concerns he would cooperate with an investigation into an illegal hijacking involving the DeMeo crew. His body was found in a car trunk in Park Slope, Brooklyn.
Michael Mandelino and Nino Martini	March 19, 1978	Mandelino (37) was accused of setting up LaFroscia for robbery; Martini (38) had no involvement. Both were shot multiple times in the head by the DeMeo crew.
Patrick Prisinzano	March 23, 1978	Prisinzano (31), a Bonanno family associate and son of Bonanno captain Angelo Prisinzano, was beaten, shot and killed before his throat was slit by DeMeo in Sheepshead Bay, Brooklyn, after refusing to return stolen jewelry from an associate of DeMeo.
Michael DiCarlo	May 16, 1978	A Lucchese family associate, DiCarlo's death was ordered by a captain for raping a young boy. He was shot, stabbed, beaten and sodomized by DeMeo, Grillo, Borelli, Senter, Joseph Guglielmo and Joseph Testa. His body was dismembered.
Kevin Guelli	June 9, 1978	Guelli (28), a cocaine dealer, was shot and killed by DeMeo crew member Chris Rosenberg after he attempted to scam him out of $10,000.
Joseph Scorney	September 28, 1978	Scorney (28) was shot and bludgeoned with a sledgehammer by Vito Arena and Richard DiNome after refusal to join DeMeo's auto theft operation. His body was put into a concrete filled barrel and dumped off a pier. Arena was sentenced to eighteen years in prison in 1985 for Scorney's murder.
Danny Grillo	November 14, 1978	Grillo (44), a longtime member of the DeMeo crew, was killed and dismembered by DeMeo, Rosenberg, Senter and Testa for racking up gambling debts and falling into drug addiction.
Gary Gardine	November 30, 1978	Gardine (25) was shot and killed by Rosenberg after he failed to pay him back from a marijuana deal. Gardine was found inside the trunk of his torched car.
Peter Waring	February 7, 1979	Waring (30), a cocaine dealer, was shot, stabbed and dismembered by DeMeo, Borelli and Paul Dordal at the Gemini Lounge for being a suspected informant.
Fred Todaro	February 19, 1979	Todaro (60) was shot by DeMeo and stabbed by Rosenberg after his nephew hired the DeMeo crew to murder him due to dispute over the building in which they duplicated pornographic films.
Charles Padnick, William Serrano and two unnamed	March 17, 1979	All four individuals were killed by Rosenberg during 12-kilo cocaine deal; Rosenberg was shot in the head and arm, but survived.
Jamie Padnick	March 19, 1979	Padnick was shot, killed and dismembered at the Gemini Lounge by DeMeo's crew after he travelled to New York to investigate his father's disappearance.
Scott Cafaro	March 23, 1979	Cafaro was shot multiple times by the DeMeo crew at the behest of a rape victim's family.
Dominick Ragucci	April 19, 1979	Ragucci (18), a college student and door-to-door salesman, was mistaken for a Cuban hitman parked outside DeMeo's home. DeMeo chased Ragucci from Massapequa Park to Suffolk County, then shot him seven times after he crashed his car.
Chris Rosenberg	May 11, 1979	Rosenberg was shot and killed by DeMeo and Senter to avoid a war with a Cuban drug cartel over the March 1979 cocaine rip-off murders caused by Rosenberg.
James Eppolito and James Eppolito Jr.	October 1, 1979	Gaggi was given permission by Gambino boss Paul Castellano to kill Eppolito Sr. (62) and his son (33) after he implicated DeMeo and Gaggi in drug trafficking and cheating the younger Eppolito out of $7,000 in a cocaine deal. Both were shot in the back of the head inside of a car in Coney Island, Brooklyn.
Khaled Daoud and Ronald Falcaro	October 12, 1979	Both men were lured to Frederick DiNome's auto shop in East Flatbush, Brooklyn then shot, killed and dismembered for competing with DeMeo's auto theft operation and allegedly cooperating with law enforcement.
Joseph Coppolino	March 7, 1980	Coppolino (37) was stabbed and decapitated by DeMeo. DeMeo suspected Coppolino of implicating him to law enforcement after the seizure of a 23-ton marijuana shipment.
Patrick Penny	May 12, 1980	Penny (21) was shot nine times in the head by DeMeo and Richard DiNome after he testified against Gaggi.
Charles Mongitore and Daniel Scutaro	June 5, 1980	Mongitore (30) was murdered by DeMeo and Borelli after he refused to drop an assault charge on the son of Gambino soldier Salvatore Mangialino. His friend, Daniel Scutaro (25), was killed after he asked for the whereabouts of Mongitore. Both bodies were found in the trunk of a car near Holy Cross Cemetery, Brooklyn.
Frank Amato	September 20, 1980	Castellano ordered the death of Amato, his son-in-law, after he hit his pregnant daughter Constance. Amato was shot and killed by DeMeo and his body was dismembered and disposed of by the DeMeo crew.
Vito Borelli	Fall 1980	Castellano ordered Borelli's death after he made a disrespectful statement about Castellano's appearance in front of his daughter. He was shot at a building in Manhattan owned by Anthony Rabito; former Bonanno underboss Salvatore Vitale allegedly drove his body to a garage in Queens, where he saw DeMeo holding a knife to dismember Borelli.
James Bennett	April 29, 1981	Bennett (65), a Lucchese associate set to testify against DeMeo crew member Richard Mastrangelo, was shot twice in the head by Anthony Senter and Joseph Testa.
Joseph Viggiano	December 4, 1981	Viggiano was shot, killed and dismembered in an eleventh floor office at Times Square by DeMeo and Gus Kalevas over a debt.
Albert Viggiano and Paul Viggiano	December 21, 1981	The father and brother of Joseph Viggiano were both shot to death on a Canarsie sidewalk by DeMeo while they were investigating Joseph's disappearance. Albert was a Genovese member.
Constance Burke	April 4, 1982	Burke (33), a federal informant, went missing after leaving the Gemini Lounge on April 4, 1982. Her remains were discovered in Canarsie on June 9 after federal investigators were alerted to the whereabouts by another informant.
John Romano and Anthony Romano	July 4, 1982	Shot and killed by DeMeo, who believed the Romano brothers set up LaFroscia for a 1978 robbery.
Albert Somma	October 18, 1982	Somma (38), a Gambino family associate, accused the DeMeo crew of drug dealing. His body was found off a highway in Lake George, New York.
Richard DiNome, John Baida and Frederick Seiden	February 24, 1984	Believed to be a potential cooperating witness, DiNome was shot execution-style along with associates Baida and Seiden, by Anthony Senter and Joseph Testa, in DiNome's Gravesend, Brooklyn home after he was indicted by a federal grand jury.
