= Dominick Montiglio =

American mobster (1947–2021)

- Born: Dominick Anthony Santamaria; July 17, 1947; New York City, U.S.
- Died: June 27, 2021 (aged 73); Albuquerque, New Mexico, U.S.
- Occupations: Mobster, Soldier
- Allegiance: Gambino crime family, United States Army

Dominick Montiglio (born Dominick Anthony Santamaria; July 17, 1947 – June 27, 2021) was an American soldier, mobster and associate of the Gambino crime family who eventually became a government witness. In later years he became an artist and podcaster, through which he chronicled his life story. He has also appeared in and been featured on various television shows related to the American Mafia.

== Early life ==
Montiglio was born in New York City to Anthony Santamaria and Marie Gaggi, both of Sicilian origin. When his father became estranged, he was raised by his uncle Nino Gaggi. His mother remarried to Anthony Montiglio, and Dominick took his surname. He was also a cousin of Frank Scalice.

== Military service ==
In 1967, Montiglio served in the Vietnam War as a sniper who reportedly killed dozens of men. He survived the Battle of Dak To and returned to the United States in 1973.

== Gambino crime family and informant ==
Upon his return from Vietnam, he started working for the Gambino family in drugs, extortion and murder, reportedly earning $250,000 per week at his peak in the Roy DeMeo crew. In 1983, Montiglio was arrested for racketeering, and the Gambinos, fearing he would talk, reportedly took out a $1 million contract on his life; Montiglio decided to collaborate with the FBI. He testified against the family and Gaggi in various trials, and reportedly helped send 56 mobsters to prison. He later changed his identity and entered the witness protection program, where he and his family stayed for the next decade as they moved between various locations in Wyoming, Alabama and Colorado; they withdrew from the program in 1993 when they could no longer cope with the constant moving.

== Later years and death ==
In his later life, Montiglio devoted himself to art. He also appeared in the 1994 documentary film Loyalty & Betrayal: The Story of the American Mob.

On June 27, 2021, Montiglio died at the age 73 in Albuquerque, New Mexico, and is buried at Santa Fe National Cemetery.
