= Jerry Capeci =

American journalist and author

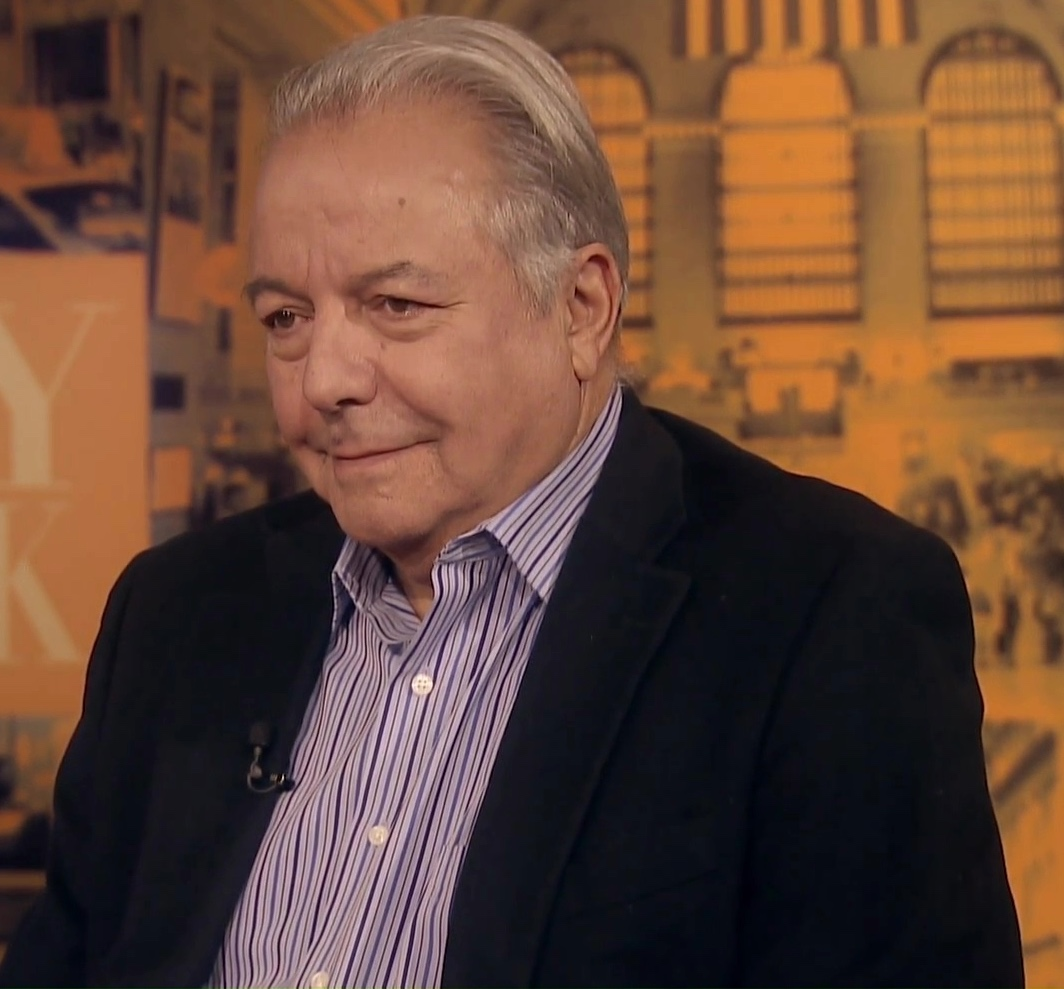
- Capeci on CUNY TV's City Talk, 2013
- Born: Gerald Capeci; Brooklyn, New York, U.S.
- Occupations: Crime journalist, author/columnist and organized crime expert
- Years active: 1960s–present

Gerald Capeci (pronounced [kəˈpiːsi]) is an American journalist and author who specializes in coverage of the Five Mafia crime families of New York City. Capeci has been described by news organizations, such as CNN and BBC, as an expert on the American Mafia.

== Career ==
Capeci was raised in Bensonhurst, Brooklyn. He worked as a truck driver and dock worker before becoming a copy boy with the New York Post in 1966. Capeci later became a police reporter for the newspaper. In 1976, he covered the funeral of Carlo Gambino for the Post. Capeci also wrote about Mafia figures for New York magazine.

Shortly after the murder of Paul Castellano in 1985, Capeci was hired by the New York Daily News. He wrote the "Gangland" column in the Daily News from 1989 until August 1995, when the column was discontinued by the newspaper. In February 1996, Capeci took the column online with his Gangland News website. "Gangland" also ran in The New York Sun between 2002 and 2007 before Capeci quit the newspaper in a salary dispute. In 2008, Gangland News became a paid subscription site.

Capeci has authored several books detailing the inner workings of the New York crime families. In 1988, he and fellow Daily News reporter Gene Mustain published a biography of John Gotti, Mob Star: The Story of John Gotti. Capeci and Mustain co-authored two other books: Murder Machine (1992), an exposé of Roy DeMeo and his crew of mafia hit men, and Gotti: the Rise and Fall (1996). With Tom Robbins, he has written Mob Boss: The Life of Little Al D’Arco, the Man Who Brought Down the Mafia (2013). Capeci has also written The Complete Idiot's Guide to the Mafia (2002) and Wiseguys Say the Darndest Things: The Quotable Mafia (2003). A compilation of columns was published in the 2003 book Jerry Capeci's Gang Land.

From 1999 to 2004, Capeci worked as director of communications at the John Jay College of Criminal Justice. In 2007, he appeared as himself on an episode of The Sopranos.

== Personal life ==
Capeci and his wife Barbara have three children.

== Works ==
- Mob Star: The Story of John Gotti (with Gene Mustain, 1988) ISBN 9780028644165
- Murder Machine: A True Story of Murder, Madness and the Mafia (with Gene Mustain, 1992) ISBN 9780091941116
- Gotti: Rise and Fall (with Gene Mustain, 1996) ISBN 9780091943172
- The Complete Idiot's Guide to the Mafia (2002) ISBN 9780028642253
- Wiseguys Say the Darndest Things: The Quotable Mafia (2003) ISBN 9781592570836
- Mob Boss: The Life of Little Al D'Arco, the Man Who Brought Down the Mafia (with Tom Robbins, 2013) ISBN 9781250006868

== See also ==
- George Anastasia
- Philip Carlo
- T. J. English
- Peter Maas
- Nicholas Pileggi
- Selwyn Raab
