= Philip Carlo =

American journalist (1949–2010)

- Born: April 18, 1949; New York City, US
- Died: November 8, 2010 (aged 61)
- Notable work: The Killer Within: In the Company of Monsters; The Night Stalker: The Life and Crimes of Richard Ramirez; The Ice Man; Gaspipe
- Style: novels and nonfiction books
- Spouse(s): Maria Cecilia Medeiros Lima (m.1975; div 1979); Laura Garofalo (m. 2007)

Philip Carlo (April 18, 1949 – November 8, 2010) was an American journalist and best selling biographer of Thomas Pitera, Richard Kuklinski, Anthony Casso, and Richard Ramirez. Carlo had amyotrophic lateral sclerosis (ALS), commonly known as "Lou Gehrig's Disease".

He was diagnosed in 2005 and reliant on a wheelchair with respirator, but retained his ability to speak and continued to write until his death. He died of the disease on November 8, 2010, at age 61.

== Early life ==
Philip Carlo was born in Bensonhurst, Brooklyn, New York. From an early age, he was involved in gang activity. Raised on the streets of Brooklyn, New York. In 1964 when Carlo was 15 years old, he witnessed a close friend shot to death in broad daylight by hit men from the Colombo crime family. Moving toward induction into an organized crime mob family, Carlo found himself in trouble with the law. At the age of 17, he was involved in a gang fight and shot in the forehead by a .22 caliber gun.

== Career ==
Carlo's passion for books ultimately steered him from the criminal path. The works of John Steinbeck, Ernest Hemingway, and Charles Dickens, among others, helped Carlo out of Brooklyn. At 19, he moved to Manhattan and secured a job as a real estate agent on the Upper West Side, Manhattan. Although successful, Carlo walked away from the business after nine years with the goal of ultimately becoming a professional writer. Despite his illness, in early November 2009, Carlo was able to appear on Shovio's Talk Back TV, to take questions about his research.

Carlo's first book was about a killer in a hospital ward. He got the idea while hospitalized at Bellevue and a woman was murdered there. The book received 125 rejection letters and was never published. His second book was about an American child kidnapped and forced into the sex trade. He got the idea while visiting Amsterdam. Carlo was shocked to see children performing sex shows in shop windows. Dutton published it as Stolen Flower in 1986. Universal Pictures optioned the book for Robert De Niro.

His last three books were written with the help of Kelsey Osgood, a Columbia University graduate from Brooklyn, who took notes for him due to his ALS. His last book, The Killer Within: In the Company of Monsters (which deals with his battle against ALS), was released posthumously in January 2011.

== Personal life ==
Philip Carlo married Laura Garofalo in December 2009. The two met in August 2006 after Carlo mentioned that one of his childhood friends, Manny Garofalo, had a brother, Eddie, who had been killed on orders of the Gambino underboss Salvatore Gravano, known as Sammy the Bull. Carlo and Manny reunited, along with Manny's niece, Eddie's daughter, Laura Garofalo.

== Works ==
Non-fiction

- The Night Stalker: The Life and Crimes of Richard Ramirez (The True Story of America's Most Feared Serial Killer), Kensington (1996) ISBN 1-57566-030-X
- The Ice Man: Confessions of a Mafia Contract Killer, St. Martin's Press (2006) ISBN 0-312-34928-9
- Gaspipe: Confessions of a Mafia Boss, William Morrow Press (2008) ISBN 978-0-06-142984-2
- The Butcher: Anatomy of a Mafia Psychopath, William Morrow Press (2009) ISBN 978-0-06-174465-5
- The Killer Within: In the Company of Monsters, Overlook Press (2011) ISBN 978-1-59020-431-3

Novels

- Stolen Flower. (1988) ISBN 0-525-24484-0
- Predators and Prayers. (2005) ISBN 0-8439-5576-7
- Smiling Wolf. (2006) ISBN 0-8439-5678-X
