= Taccetta =

Taccetta is an Italian surname. Notable people with the surname include:

- Martin Taccetta (born 1951), American mobster
- Matías Taccetta (born 1977), Argentine politician
- Michael Taccetta (born 1947), American mobster
