= Alphonse D'Arco =

American mobster (1932–2019)

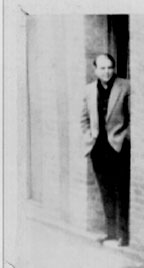
- FBI surveillance photo of D'Arco
- Born: July 28, 1932; Brooklyn, New York, U.S.
- Died: March 28, 2019 (aged 86)
- Other names: "The Professor", “Little Al”

Alphonse "Little Al" D'Arco (July 28, 1932 – March 28, 2019) was an American mobster who became the acting boss of the Lucchese crime family in New York City. He was the first boss, acting or otherwise, of a New York crime family to become a government witness.

== Biography ==
Born in Brooklyn, New York, D'Arco grew up in Williamsburg, Brooklyn near the Brooklyn Navy Yard and attended a Catholic grammar school. At age 15, he dropped out of high school. In 1951, during the Korean War, D'Arco served two years as a volunteer in the U.S. Army. After an honorable discharge from the army, D'Arco returned to Brooklyn and got married. He and his wife had five children. One of his sons, Joseph D'Arco, became a member of the Lucchese family.

During the 1950s, D'Arco became an associate in the Vario Crew, a Lucchese crew led by longtime caporegime Paul Vario and based in the Canarsie neighborhood. In 1959, D'Arco met future Lucchese boss Victor Amuso. In the 1960s, D'Arco was convicted on drug-related charges and spent several years in prison. After his release, D'Arco returned to the Lucchese family, which was then run by boss Anthony "Tony Ducks" Corallo. Even allowing for the longstanding freeze on new members dating back to 1957, D'Arco had a long wait to become a made man. He finally received his "button" (becoming a made man), on August 23, 1982, just a month after his 50th birthday.

In the 1980s, D'Arco opened an Italian restaurant, La Donna Rosa, in Little Italy, Manhattan. It would serve as a frequent Lucchese meeting place.

D'Arco became involved in bookmaking, loansharking, occasional drug deals and other criminal activities. During his criminal career, D'Arco would be involved in ten murders. His criminal record would include extortion, murder, murder conspiracy, robbery, arson, tax evasion, counterfeiting, narcotics trafficking, burglary, hijacking and assault. In 1983, D'Arco was convicted of heroin trafficking and was sentenced to four years in prison. He was paroled in 1986.

=== Caporegime ===
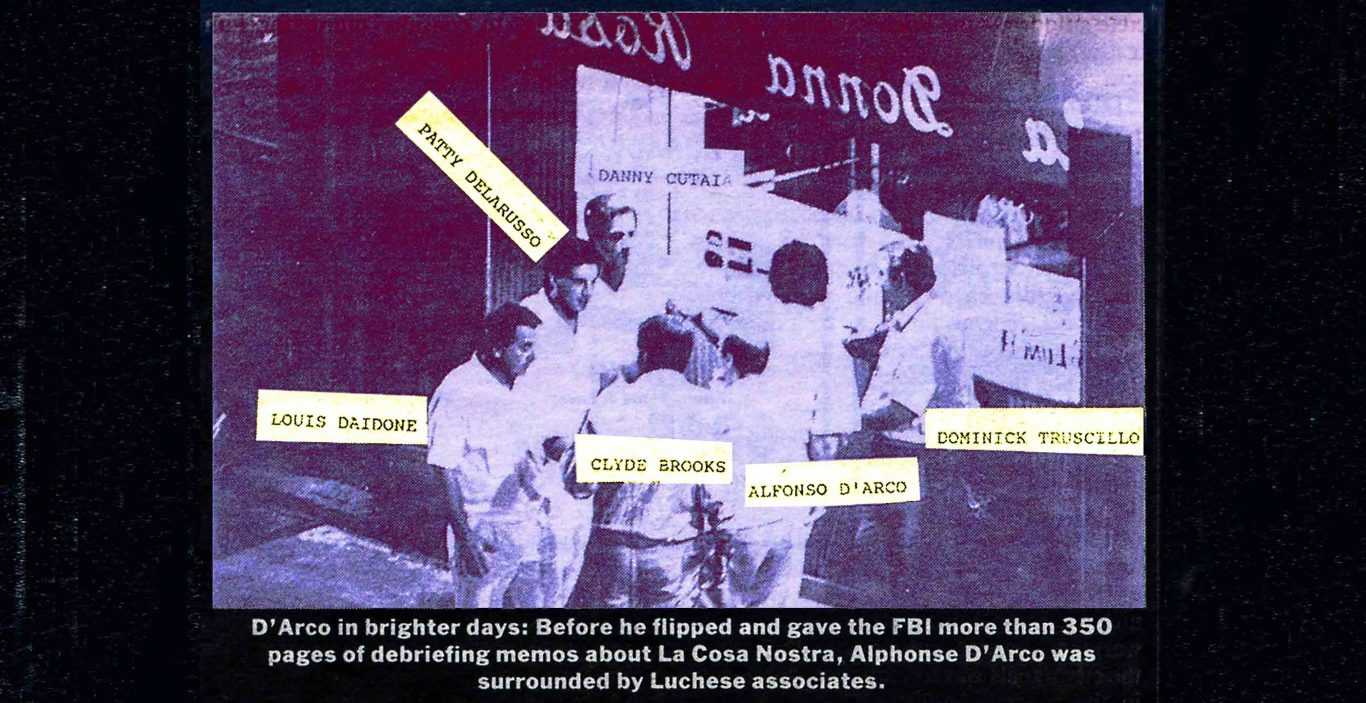
FBI surveillance photo of Al D'Arco along with Danny Cutaia, Patty Dellorusso, Louis Daidone, Dominick Truscello and Clyde Brooks

In 1986, Victor Amuso took control of the Lucchese family. Two years later, Anthony "Gaspipe" Casso became underboss. In 1988, Vario died in prison whilst serving a life sentence for the infamous Lufthansa Heist, as a result, Amuso promoted D'Arco to capo of the old Vario Crew. In 1990, Amuso selected D'Arco to organize a "Lucchese construction panel". A committee of Lucchese family members, the panel would oversee the Lucchese-controlled unions and construction companies and co-ordinate joint business ventures with the other Five Families of the New York Cosa Nostra.

By the mid-1980s, D'Arco was becoming a rich man due to the earnings from his crew and from his own loansharking portfolio. Soon D'Arco would collect tribute from the Lucchese crews for Amuso and Casso. On one Christmas, D'Arco put together a $100,000 holiday gift for the two leaders from all the capos.

In August 1990, D'Arco facilitated the murder of Lucchese mobster Bruno Facciola. Amuso suspected Facciola of being an informant and ordered his death. Facciola tried to run away when he found out he was about to be set up, but he was tackled and dragged back into the garage, where he was stabbed and shot. On Amuso's instructions, the hitmen placed a dead canary, the sign of an informant, in Facciola's mouth after they killed him.

=== Amuso and Casso ===
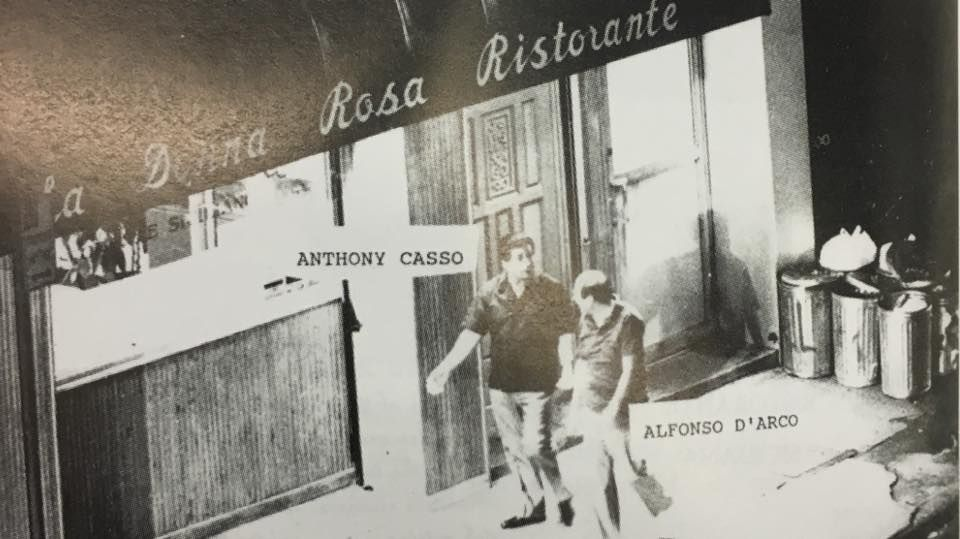
FBI surveillance photograph of Anthony Casso and D'Arco

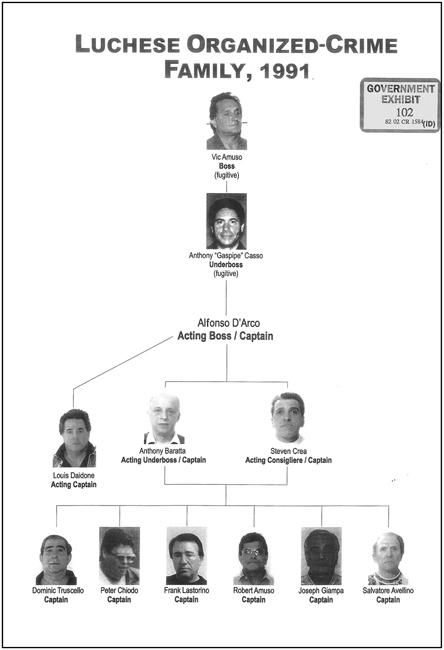
Lucchese crime family - Chart 1991

In January 1991, Amuso and Casso received an early warning about an upcoming federal indictment and went into hiding, leaving D'Arco as the acting boss. D'Arco would meet with them twice in Scranton, Pennsylvania, and several times at safe houses in Brooklyn. In the summer of 1991, D'Arco met with warring factions in the Colombo crime family to mediate a peace agreement. However, Casso sent him on this mission in hopes that the Luccheses could grab some Colombo rackets.

Through their ruthlessness and brutality, Amuso and Casso generated many internal conflicts in the Lucchese family and broke down the unity and loyalty of its members. Family members felt the two bosses were greedy and paranoid, ordering too many murders to make themselves feel secure.

In early 1991, Amuso became falsely convinced that Lucchese capo Peter "Fat Pete" Chiodo had become a government witness and ordered D'Arco to kill him. In May 1991, Chiodo was shot 12 times, but survived the attack because his girth kept any bullets from severing critical arteries. Chiodo then became a government witness, and testified in June 1991 at a Lucchese trial.

Amuso and Casso sent more hit orders to D'Arco. Amuso ordered the family's entire New Jersey faction, the Jersey Crew, killed (the "whack Jersey order") when it refused to increase the family's share of their profits. Casso gave D'Arco a list of 49 people he wanted killed—half of whom were Lucchese wiseguys. Amuso then ordered D'Arco to bring in a bomb expert from Philadelphia in order to blow up Gambino boss John Gotti. All of these actions convinced D'Arco and other Lucchese wiseguys that Amuso and Casso were no longer acting rationally. Later, D'Arco explained his role in the family:

When a job needed to be done, whenever they needed to do something unpleasant to someone, I was the prick chosen by them.

=== Defection ===
D'Arco knew that Amuso and Casso blamed him for the failed attack on Chiodo, and believed they were waiting to kill him. In July 1991, in a Staten Island meeting, Amuso and Casso replaced D'Arco as acting boss with a four-man panel of capos. D'Arco was named to this panel, but it was obvious that Amuso and Casso no longer trusted him.

On September 18, 1991, D'Arco attended a meeting of Lucchese leaders in Manhattan's Kimberly Hotel. In the middle of the meeting, Mike DeSantis, a soldier in the crew of panel member Frank Lastorino, showed up even though he wasn't a member of the panel himself. D'Arco noticed DeSantis had a gun hidden under his shirt, in the small of his back. DeSantis was also wearing a bulletproof vest. Later, DeSantis went to the bathroom—and when he came back, the gun was gone. D'Arco knew this was a classic setup for a hit; the next person to go into the bathroom was likely to come out shooting. Convinced his life was threatened, D'Arco rushed out of the hotel. His driver was nowhere to be found—another indication that D'Arco had been marked for death.

The next day, FBI agents warned D'Arco that he was indeed in danger. Later that day, D'Arco decided to desert the Mafia. However, knowing that Casso frequently boasted that he had at least one FBI agent on his payroll, he was too fearful to go to the FBI office in Manhattan. He fled the city along with his wife, son, and several other close relatives. On Saturday night, D'Arco traveled to the FBI office in New Rochelle, New York and offered to become a government witness. Despite being under FBI protection, D'Arco still feared that a corrupt FBI agent had betrayed him to Casso. When federal prosecutors finally met with D'Arco, they found him hiding in the bathroom of his hotel room. At the time, he was the highest-ranking member of a New York crime family to break his blood oath and testify against the mob, a standing he would maintain until Bonanno boss Joseph "The Ear" Massino turned informer in 2004.

=== Government witness ===
Over the next ten years, D'Arco testified in a dozen trials along with many grand jury hearings and other legal proceedings. His testimony helped convict Amuso, acting Colombo crime family boss Victor "Little Vic" Orena, Bonanno crime family consigliere Anthony Spero, Genovese crime family consigliere James Ida and Genovese boss Vincent "Chin" Gigante. D'Arco also testified at the trial of Louis Eppolito and Stephen Caracappa, the two corrupt NYPD detectives who provided Casso with information. His testimony, along with that of several other Lucchese defectors, nearly destroyed the Lucchese family.

D'Arco joined the federal Witness Protection Program. According to government sources, D'Arco was an excellent witness and did not commit any further criminal acts.

== Death ==
D'Arco died in March 2019 from complications related to kidney disease. He was 86.
