= Jackie DiNorscio =

US gangster (1940–2004)

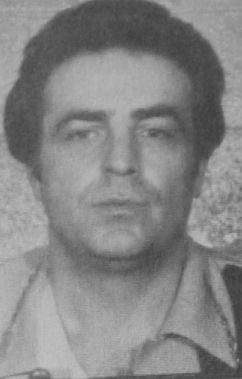
- Born: Giacomo DiNorscio; July 20, 1940; Newark, New Jersey, U.S.
- Died: November 14, 2004 (aged 64); Nutley, New Jersey, U.S.
- Occupation: Mobster
- Spouse: Bella DiNorscio
- Allegiance: Lucchese crime family
- Conviction: Drug trafficking (1986)
- Penalty: 30 years’ imprisonment

Giacomo "Jackie" DiNorscio (July 20, 1940 – November 14, 2004) was an American mobster who was a member of the Philadelphia crime family, and later the New Jersey faction of the Lucchese crime family. He acted as his own lawyer (pro se) in the United States v. Anthony Accetturo et al. RICO trial, famous for being the longest Mafia trial in American history at 21 months. This trial was conducted while DiNorscio was already incarcerated on separate drug charges. He was ultimately found not guilty (along with his fellow co-defendants) after a short deliberation of only 14 hours, by the jury. After the trial, DiNorscio went back to prison; he was released on November 23, 2002, after serving 17.5 years of a 30-year sentence.

The film Find Me Guilty, directed by Sidney Lumet and starring Vin Diesel as DiNorscio, is based on this trial. DiNorscio died in November 2004, near the end of shooting.

== Criminal career ==
Early in his criminal career, DiNorscio was an associate of the Philadelphia crime family. The longtime boss of the Philadelphia Mafia, Angelo "Gentle Don" Bruno, was killed on March 21, 1980, resulting in a power vacuum in the crime family. The Lucchese crime family mobsters Anthony Accetturo and Michael Taccetta used the situation to establish a new foothold in Philadelphia as a part of the Lucchese family's Jersey Crew, with illegal gambling and loansharking operations. Because of the feuding between the two rival factions of Philadelphia's crime family, as well as both Taccetta and Accetturo taking advantage of the situation, the relationship between Philadelphia and the New York families, especially the Luccheses, worsened and cooperation between the families eventually ended. It was around this time that prominent Philadelphia family associate, DiNorscio, along with many others, defected to the New Jersey faction of the Lucchese family to earn greater profits and to avoid being killed in Philadelphia's mob war.

In June 1986, DiNorscio was arrested on drug charges related to operating a cocaine distribution network based in the Fort Lauderdale area. He was convicted of drug trafficking in October 1986 and sentenced to 30 years in federal prison the following month.

=== Federal RICO trial ===
During the early 1980s, U.S. law enforcement started an operation to discover and prosecute all organized crime activities in the North Jersey area. After a four-year-long investigation indictments were brought against 20 members of the Jersey Crew in August 1985. Accetturo was brought from Florida, the Taccetta brothers were arrested in Newark, and 17 other known members were put on trial for 77 Racketeer Influenced and Corrupt Organizations Act (RICO) predicates. These charges of criminal activity included running a criminal enterprise in Florida that included the sale and distribution of cocaine, as well as credit-card fraud, gambling and loansharking from 1976 to 1985, when they were indicted. The trial began in November 1986.

During the trial, DiNorscio went on to fire his lawyer and represent himself during the entire trial. DiNorscio is reported to have charmed the jury; as the trial ended in August 1988, all 20 defendants were acquitted, with a great deal of "pull" attributed to the congenial personality demonstrated by DiNorscio while he represented himself against the charges.

== In media ==
The film Find Me Guilty, directed by Sidney Lumet and starring Vin Diesel as DiNorscio, is based on the trial and the real DiNorscio who was known to make "off-color jokes" while representing himself.

DiNorscio was interviewed while still in jail for a 1993 episode of "America Undercover" Mob Stories" on HBO.
