= Martin Taccetta =

American mobster (born 1951)

- Taccetta's New Jersey prison image
- Born: May 2, 1951 (age 75); Newark, New Jersey, U.S.
- Other name: "Marty"
- Occupation: Mobster
- Relatives: Michael "Mad Dog" Taccetta (brother)
- Allegiance: Lucchese crime family
- Convictions: Racketeering, drug trafficking, illegal gambling, extortion, loansharking, and conspiracy (1993); Racketeering (2008)
- Penalty: 30 years' imprisonment (1993); Eight years' imprisonment (2015)

Martin "Marty" Taccetta (born May 2, 1951) is an imprisoned New Jersey mobster who was the alleged boss of the Jersey Crew, a powerful faction of the Lucchese crime family.

== Early life ==
Born in Newark, New Jersey in 1951, Martin Taccetta is the son of Anthony Taccetta, a self-employed building materials supplier who allegedly belonged to the Lucchese family. Martin's older brother Michael "Mad Dog" Taccetta is a capo in the Lucchese family who later served as boss of the Jersey Crew. During the early 1960s, Martin Taccetta, his brother, and his cousins belonged to a tough street gang in Newark, New Jersey. Martin and brother Michael played on the same Little League baseball team as did their cousins, Daniel and Thomas Ricciardi and future mob associate Robert Spagnola.

He is the cousin of mobsters Michael Perna, and Daniel, Joseph and Thomas Ricciardi. Michael is also the uncle of Joseph Perna born c.a. 1969, John G. Perna born c.a. 1977 and Ralph M. Perna Junior born c.a. 1972 who are the sons of his cousin Ralph V. Perna and his wife Roseanne. They all followed their father and uncle into organized crime. He is also the uncle of Carlo Taccetta, the son of his brother Michael, and Pamela Abdy, the Hollywood film producer whose credits include "Garden State" that was awarded an Independent Spirit Award for Best First Feature in 2005 as well as three other movies including "Man on the Moon" in 1999.

By the late 1960s, both Martin and Michael Taccetta started working with Lucchese mobster Anthony "Tumac" Accetturo in illegal gambling and loansharking operations. At that time, the boss of the Lucchese family was Gaetano "Tommy" Lucchese. In 1976, the Taccetta brothers and Accetturo all became full members, or "made men", in the Lucchese family, which was now run by new boss Anthony "Tony Ducks" Corallo, Accetturo's old mentor.

== The Jersey crew ==
During the late 1970s and early 1980s, the Jersey crew grew in power, wealth, and independence. Based in Northern New Jersey, the crew had 20 members with its own family-like hierarchy. When Accetturo was indicted on state charges during this period, he moved to Florida. While in exile, Accetturo continued to run the Jersey crew through his underboss, Michael Taccetta, with Martin as second in command.

Michael and Martin Taccetta operated large gambling and loansharking operations around Newark, New Jersey, as well as drug trafficking and money laundering activities through their legitimate business, Taccetta Group Enterprises. When Philadelphia crime family boss Angelo "Gentle Don" Bruno was murdered on March 12, 1980, Accetturo took advantage of the ensuing chaos to establish a new Lucchese crew in Philadelphia.

In 1984, the Jersey leadership murdered James "Jimmy Sinatra" Craporatta, a contractor and Lucchese associate. When Craporatta refused to share the proceeds of a video gaming operation he controlled, the Jersey mobsters beat him to death with metal head golf clubs.

== The longest Mafia trial in American history ==
In 1985, Taccetta and 19 co-defendants were indicted in New Jersey on 76 counts of labor racketeering, illegal gambling, loansharking, extortion, drug trafficking, money laundering, conspiracy and murder for hire. These indictments were the result of a four-year investigation of the Jersey crew. Much of the evidence came from wiretapped conversations at the Hole-in-the-Wall, a restaurant frequented by mob figures in Newark, New Jersey.

In 1986, when the trial started, the Lucchese family in New York underwent a momentous leadership change with the conviction of Corallo. Facing a life sentence in prison, Corallo designated Lucchese capo Victor Amuso as the new acting boss of the family. Almost immediately, a dispute occurred between Accetturo and Amuso over the independence of the Jersey crew, and the large increase in tribute that Amuso expected from them.

On August 26, 1988, after a 21-month trial that was the longest Mafia trial in U.S. history, all 20 defendants were acquitted. Prosecutors were stunned by the verdict. The general consensus was that jurors did not trust the government witnesses, many of whom were themselves criminals testifying in return for reduced sentences. As the jurors left the courtroom, the defendants cheered and clapped for them.

== Lucchese family conflicts ==
With the end of the racketeering trial, the Taccettas and the Jersey crew were shaken by conflict. During the trial, the strong relationship between the Taccetta brothers and Anthony Accetturo turned into a bitter rivalry. Michael Taccetta was jealous of the power that Anthony Accetturo Jr. was gaining in the family, along with a feeling that Anthony Accetturo Sr. was not showing Michael Taccetta sufficient respect. The Jersey crew soon split into Taccetta and Accetturo factions. In addition to the crew rivalries, family boss Amuso had finally lost patience with the entire New Jersey crew.

In the Fall of 1988, the dispute with Amuso turned to crisis when he demanded that henceforth the Jersey crew turn over 50% of their earnings to him. Both Accetturo and the Taccettas refused his demand. An enraged Amuso summoned the entire Jersey crew to a meeting in New York. Fearful of being the killed, the crew boycotted the meeting and all went into hiding. At this stage, Amuso gave his famous order "Whack Jersey", kill the entire Jersey crew, especially Accetturo. Over the next 12 months, as Amuso calmed down, Jersey crew members started returning to the family. During this period, Martin and Michael Taccetta reaffirmed their loyalty to Amuso.

To weaken the Accetturo faction in New Jersey, Michael Taccetta told Amuso that Accetturo was plotting with a Colombian drug gang to assassinate the Lucchese family leadership. Amuso agreed to the murder contract and allowed the Taccetta brothers to assume control of the Jersey crew.

== Weakened crew ==
Michael was now leader of the Jersey crew, with Martin Taccetta serving as his consigliere. However, the long racketeering trial and the conflict with Amuso had hurt the crew, and their legal problems were not over. Michael Taccetta was soon convicted of tax evasion and sent to prison in Minnesota. At this point, Martin took over the crew.

On December 5, 1989, Martin Taccetta was indicted in California for fraud over the operation of an adult film company. The company had bought video equipment on credit, sold the equipment, and then closed without paying the suppliers.

Also in 1989, Taccetta was indicted in New Jersey on conspiracy to defraud the Joint Underwriters Association of more than $400,000 in phony auto insurance claims. During this time period, Martin Taccetta began cooperating with Gambino crime family captain Thomas "Tommy" Gambino on activities in New Jersey.

== Imprisonment ==
In 1991, Accetturo and the Taccetta brothers were indicted on charges of racketeering, narcotics, illegal gambling, extortion, loansharking, conspiracy and the 1984 Craporatta murder. Reacting to the indictments and the murder contract from Amuso, Accetturo decided to become a government witness and testified against both Martin and Michael Taccetta. In 1993, Martin Taccetta was acquitted of murder, but convicted of racketeering charges and, along with his brother, was sentenced to 30 years to life in prison.

In 2001, Martin Taccetta's lawyers uncovered a Federal Bureau of Investigation (FBI) memo that said their confidential informants cleared Taccetta from the Craporatta murder. For some reason, this memo was not produced during Taccetta's trial. The lawyers were planning to use this information to appeal his conviction.

On December 8, 2005, after serving ten years in prison, Martin Taccetta was released on appeal. A state Superior Court judge ruled he had not received adequate legal representation prior to his 1993 trial. Taccetta had rejected a plea bargain deal from the government based on inadequate advice from his attorney.

== New indictment ==
On May 8, 2008, Martin Tacchetta was indicted along with 23 other New Jersey gangsters for racketeering. Taccetta's charges included conspiring to use extortion to collect a loan from an unidentified debtor and for conspiring in 2007 with Gambino mobster Andrew Merola to extort $20,000 from contractors to allow non-union labor on a construction project in Morristown, New Jersey.

In August 2009, the New Jersey Supreme Court overturned the Superior Court ruling and reinstated Martin Taccetta's 1993 racketeering sentence. New Jersey State Attorney General Anne Milgram made the following statement,

For decades Marty Taccetta was one of the most prolific members of organized crime, whose power and control over the Lucchese family threatened the residents of New Jersey and illegally impacted commercial activity. We are gratified that the Supreme Court's decision will ensure that he will be returned to state prison to serve the remainder of his sentence of life plus 10 years for racketeering and extortion.

On June 10, 2010, U.S. Attorney Paul J. Fishman moved to dismiss the pending counts against Taccetta "because further prosecution of these charges is not in the interests of the United States at this time," according to a court order.

As of November 2011, Martin Taccetta is serving his life sentence at the New Jersey State Prison in Trenton, New Jersey. He will be eligible for parole after serving 30 years in prison.

On September 30, 2015, Martin Taccetta was sentenced to eight years in prison after pleading guilty to racketeering in Operation Heat.

== In popular culture ==
- The 2006 Sidney Lumet film Find Me Guilty is loosely based on the Taccetta brothers' 1988 racketeering trial that lasted 21 months.
