= Lucchese crime family New Jersey faction =

Faction of the Lucchese crime family

- Founded: 1920s
- Founder: Lucchese crime family
- Founding location: Newark, New Jersey, United States
- Years active: c. 1920s–present
- Territory: Northern New Jersey counties of Essex, Morris, Union, Monmouth, Passaic, Bergen and Sussex
- Ethnicity: Italians as "made men" and other ethnicities as associates
- Membership (est.): 50 made members (2004)
- Activities: Racketeering, conspiracy, loansharking, money laundering, murder, drug trafficking, illegal gambling, and extortion
- Allies: Bonanno; Colombo; DeCavalcante; Gambino; Genovese (New Jersey faction); Philadelphia
- Rivals: Various gangs in New Jersey, including their allies

The New Jersey faction of the Lucchese crime family, also known as the Jersey Crew, is a powerful crew of Italian-American mobsters which operates throughout the Northern New Jersey area. During the 1970s into the late 1980s, the crew was led by Anthony Accetturo and his protégé Michael Taccetta. In 1987, Victor Amuso took over the family and began demanding a higher percentage of tribute from the crew. Accetturo refused and a war erupted between the New Jersey members and the New York members. This left brothers Michael and Martin Taccetta in charge of the crew as they tried to have Accetturo and his family murdered. In 1993, Accetturo defected and became a government witness. He helped convict Michael and Martin Taccetta. The crew is currently controlled by Joseph R. "Big Joe" Perna.

== History ==
=== Early history ===
The early members of the Lucchese crime family's New Jersey faction can be traced back to independent Italian criminal groups that operated in Newark, New Jersey. During the early 1900s, in the city of Newark, Italian criminals was divided into two ethnic factions: the "Sicilians" led by Stefano "Don Steven" Badami and the "Neapolitans" led by Ruggiero "the Boot" Boiardo.

In 1920, Prohibition began in the United States making all alcohol illegal, presenting criminals with the opportunity to earn large amount of money through bootlegging, the selling and transporting of illegal alcohol. During prohibition bootleggers fought for territory and dominance which lead to murders and violence erupting in cities and towns. In Newark a violent war broke out between Boiardo's Neapolitan faction and Jewish gangster Abner "Longie" Zwillman which lasted for years as the two groups fought to control bootlegging operations in New Jersey. Boiardo controlled his bootlegging operations from the First Ward (Newark's Little Italy), while Zwillman controlled his bootlegging operations from the Third Ward.

In 1930, a bloody Mafia war, known as the Castellammarese War, began in New York City, as Sicilian Castellammarese Mafia boss Salvatore Maranzano fought with New York City Mafia boss Joe "The Boss" Masseria for the position of capo dei capi. In Newark, the Sicilian boss Stefano Badami joined Maranzano's side, while Boiardo formed an alliance with Masseria. On April 15, 1931, Masseria was murdered, ending the war, leaving Maranzano the most powerful mobster in America. Maranzano appointed Badami the boss of the newly established Newark family. On September 10, 1931, Maranzano was murdered leaving Badami vulnerable to his enemies. Three days later on September 13, 1931, Badami's underboss Sam Monaco and top member Louis Russo were discovered dead after their bodies were found floating in Newark Bay. Badami fearing for his own life he fled Newark leaving the Newark family without leadership.

The Badami Newark family began to break apart, as many members joined the Gagliano-Lucchese family becoming the newly formed Jersey crew, while other members stayed with Gaspare D'Amico. Gagliano family boss Thomas Gagliano appointed Settimo "Big Sam" Accardi the caporegime of the Jersey crew based in Newark.

The old Newark family had become more dysfunctional after D'Amico became boss as he faced a number of rebellions against his leadership. In 1937, D'Amico survived a second attempted assassination and fled leaving Newark. It was later discovered by the Commission that Profaci family boss Joseph Profaci, had ordered the assassination attempt on D'Amico. The Commission decided to disband the Newark family, while declaring Newark an open city and dividing the family's territory among the Five Families of New York. In the city of Newark the five families each established crews, while allowing other gangsters like Abner Zwillman, members of the Philadelphia crime family, and the former Newark boss Badami to operate.

The Gagliano-Lucchese's Jersey crew led by Settimo Accardi grew in power expanding into more areas of Newark and northern New Jersey. While the Luciano-Genovese family's New Jersey faction promoted Richard Boiardo to caporegime of the Newark crew and powerful Bergen county mobster Willie Moretti became the family's underboss. The Bonanno family's had Antonio Riela leading their Newark crew while the Mangano family's had Antonio Paterno, a former Newark family member running their Newark operations and the Profaci family put Salvatore Lombardino, the man behind the attempted murder of Newark boss D'Amico, in control of their Newark operations.

=== Accardi to Abate ===
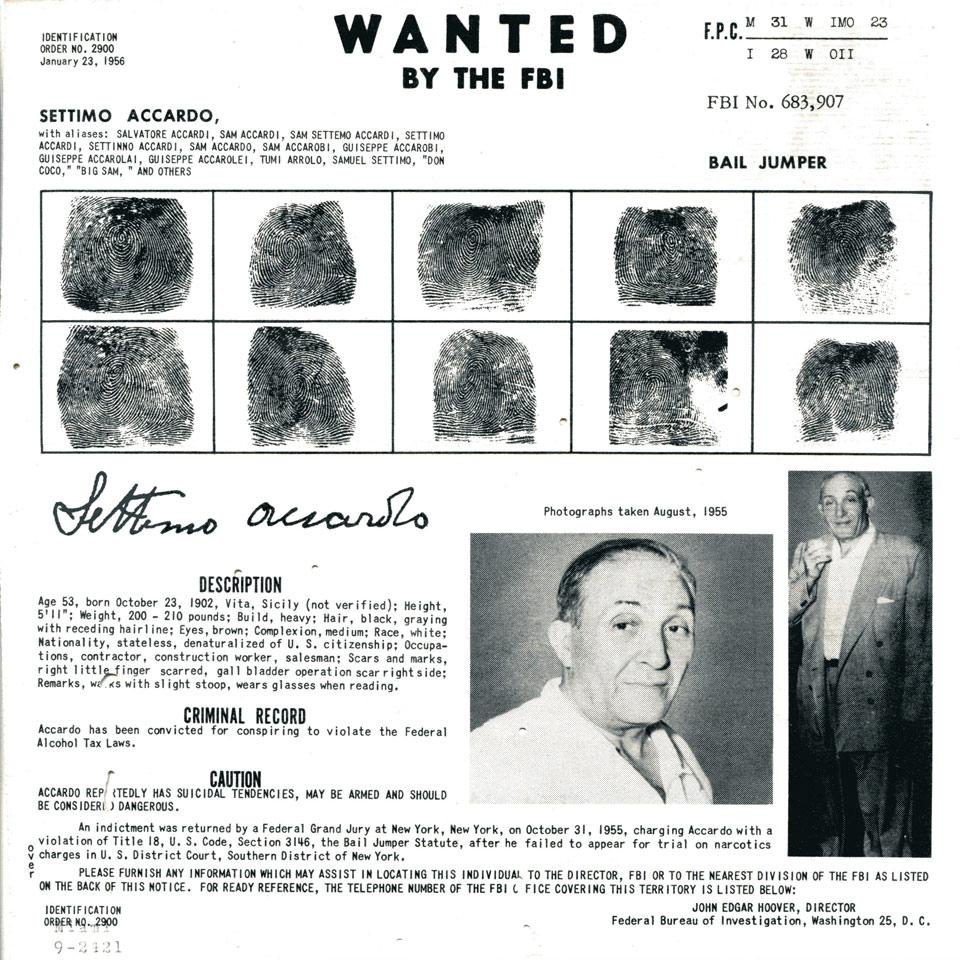
FBI Wanted Poster of Settimo Accardi issued on January 23, 1956

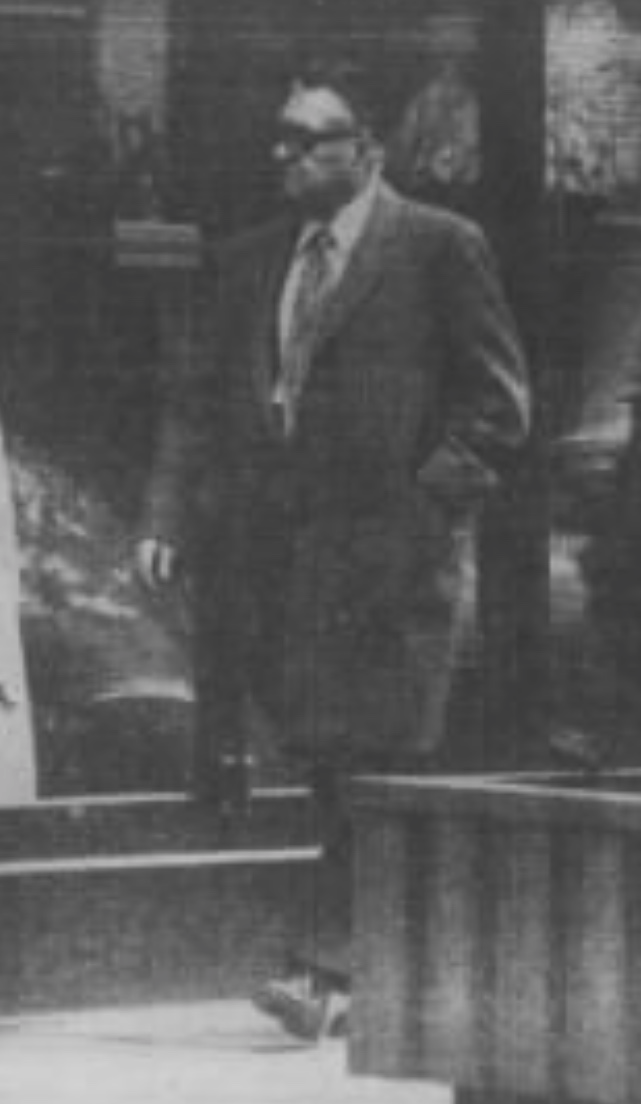
FBI surveillance photo of New Jersey Capo Joseph Abate

During the 1940s and early 1950s, the Jersey crew was headed by Settimo "Big Sam" Accardi in Newark. In 1953, Accardi's U.S. citizenship was revoked after not disclosing his previous arrest record. Accardi was arrested in 1955, on narcotic charges and fled the country. With Accardi's absence Joseph Abate took over running the New Jersey crew.

Abate had been arrested during the 1930s and 1940s for tax revenue, liquor violations and conspiracy charges. By 1959, Abate had been under government surveillance and viewed as a powerful mobster operating in the Atlantic City area. His closest allies were his cousin Leonard Pizzolato, his proteges Anthony Accetturo, Carmine Accardi and Vincent Craporatta, a powerful mobster in his gambling network. Abate maintained close ties to Genovese family, Philadelphia family, the DeCavalcante family and Bonnano family caporegime Joseph Zicarelli. Under Abate's leadership the crew was operating in New Jersey counties of Essex, Morris, Union, Passaic, Bergen, Monmouth, Sussex, Ocean and Atlantic controlling illegal gambling, loansharking, narcotics trafficking, extortion and other crimes.

In 1971, Accetturo relocated to Florida leaving his cousin Michael Taccetta to supervise the Jersey crew and all the operations. The Accetturo used Taccetta to control his gambling and narcotics network that operate in Essex, Union, Morris and Passaic counties and a small scale in Monmouth, Ocean, Bergen and Sussex counties. While Michael Taccetta was controlling the Essex County gambling operations he was able to absorbed the Essex gambling territory that was run by Genovese family member Tino Fiumara, after Fiumara was imprisoned and take over the Essex gambling territory that was controlled by Philly family members Pasquale Martorano and Antonio Caponigro. Accetturo also had Taccetta control his multi-million dollar narcotics distribution network that was operating from South America and the Caribbean to Florida, New Jersey and New York City. In 1975, Angelo Taccetta the father of Michael and Martin Taccetta, assumed control of the Genovese family's Newark gambling network run by soldier Anthony Campisi.

=== Accetturo in charge ===
Toward the 1970s, the crew was unofficially headed by Anthony "Tumac" Accetturo, because Accetturo had not yet been inducted into the Lucchese crime family due to "closed books". The leader of the crew was still Joseph Abate, with Anthony Accetturo as his protégé waiting to take over.

The crew then came to control the entire Newark area, with loansharking, illegal gambling, narcotics, money laundering and extortion operations. Reportedly, with Accetturo in charge of the crew, they handed something between $70,000 and $80,000 a year to Tommy Lucchese.

Upon Lucchese's death in 1967, and several years of different "acting bosses" such as Carmine "Mr. Gribbs" Tramunti and Ettore "Eddie" Coco.

At the end of 1973, when Anthony Corallo was released from prison, he was quickly installed as boss. Corallo, a longtime friend of Accetturo, quickly inducted Accetturo and his second in commands Michael "Mad Dog" Taccetta and Martin Taccetta into the Lucchese crime family, so they could officially control the entire New Jersey area.

=== Accetturo and Taccetta ===
During the early 1970s, Accetturo relocated to Miami to avoid prosecution for his illegal gambling and loansharking business in Newark, and Michael Taccetta was soon promoted by Accetturo to run the day-to-day activities. Meanwhile, Accetturo created illegal operations in Florida where he could lie low from law enforcement. Taccetta soon expanded Accetturo's former operations in New Jersey as the crew grew stronger, and several members of the Lucchese crime family in New York were sent to win over the moneymakers. Taccetta developed an operation that soon controlled the entire New Jersey area. From arson and burglary, to loansharking and extortion, to illegal gambling and drug trafficking, the Jersey Crew soon made millions of dollars in profit, and sent hundreds of thousands of dollars back to Anthony Corallo in New York City for years. Both Accetturo and Taccetta soon became the most powerful mobsters in New Jersey. Accetturo was repeatedly indicted, and the State of New Jersey tried to extradite him but failed due to his "poor" health. Accetturo later relocated his business interests to Miami and Hollywood, Florida, but still remained the official boss of New Jersey. Michael Taccetta was chosen once again to run the Northern New Jersey crew of the Lucchese crime family, during the mid-1970s. Toward the late 1970s, the crew allegedly earned something between $700,000 and $800,000 in profit every year.

=== Operating in Philadelphia ===
In 1980, the longtime Don of the Philadelphia crime family, Angelo "Gentle Don" Bruno, was shot and killed on March 12. This resulted in a huge power vacuum between prominent Bruno members Philip Testa and Nicodemo Scarfo, both fighting for the total control of the Bruno crime family. Accetturo and Taccetta, on the other hand, used their situation to establish a new foothold in Philadelphia, as a part of the Jersey Crew, with illegal gambling and loansharking operations. Because of the bad relations between the two factions in Philadelphia's crime family, as well as both Taccetta and Accetturo taking advantage of the situation, the relationship between Philadelphia and the New York Families, especially the Luccheses, eventually turned worse after the murder of Angelo Bruno, which led to all cooperation between the families being completely terminated. It was around this time that prominent Bruno member Giacomo "Jackie" DiNorscio, and many others, defected to the New Jersey faction of the Lucchese crime family to make more profit and to avoid being killed.

=== 21 months in trial ===
During the early 1980s, U.S. law enforcement started an operation to discover and prosecute all organized crime activities in the North Jersey area. After a four-year-long investigation indictments were brought against 20 members of the Jersey Crew in August 1985. Accetturo was brought from Florida, the Taccetta brothers were arrested in Newark, and 17 other known members were put on trial for 77 Racketeer Influenced and Corrupt Organizations Act (RICO) predicates. These charges of criminal activity included running a criminal enterprise in Florida that included the sale and distribution of cocaine, as well as credit-card fraud, gambling and loansharking from 1976 to 1985, when they were indicted. The trial began in November 1986. The prosecution included 400 surveillance tapes, testimony of 89 witnesses and thousands of documents and photos.

DiNorscio is reported to have charmed the jury; as the trial ended in August 1988, all 20 defendants were acquitted, with a great deal of "pull" attributed to the congenial personality demonstrated by DiNorscio while he represented himself against the charges.

The trial, United States v. Anthony Accetturo et al. RICO trial, was the longest Mafia trial in American history at 21 months. The jury found all defendants not guilty after a short deliberation of only 14 hours.

=== The Taccetta era ===
Even with the acquittals, the authorities eventually managed to split up the Jersey Crew when Michael Taccetta grew jealous of Anthony Accetturo, Jr., who was supposed to take over for Anthony Accetturo upon his retirement. The Taccetta brothers reportedly declared war on Accetturo, who had escaped to Miami to avoid being killed. Although the war never got to a point of massive shooting in the streets, the two factions were close to killing and destroying each other completely in late 1988. The crew had other problems, however, when the Lucchese crime family was given new leadership under Vittorio "Vic" Amuso, who stepped up after Corallo.

=== New York rivalry ===
Toward the year of 1989, the Jersey Crew's war had diminished because the two factions were more interested in making money than in arguing about who was in charge. The new leaders were reportedly Michael Taccetta and Martin Taccetta, who operated through their legitimate business, Taccetta Group Enterprises, which was under control by the Lucchese crime family. Through the company, the Jersey Crew were able to launder money and pay their tribute to the heads of the Luccheses in New York. However, both Accetturo and Taccetta had apparently skimmed off some profit and only sent a $50,000-a-year payment to the new leaders from the Brooklyn faction. When Anthony Corallo was sentenced to life imprisonment in 1987, and his protégé Anthony "Buddy" Luongo was found murdered earlier, the new bosses Victor Amuso and Anthony "Gaspipe" Casso, known for their brutal use of violence, questioned the profit they received from the Jersey Crew. When they demanded 50% of the crew's total profit, both Taccetta and Accetturo reportedly refused, portraying themselves as hard-working money machines that were only having a bad year. Amuso and Casso, on the other hand, saw this as an act of weakness, and gave the order to "Whack Jersey", meaning that the entire North Jersey faction should be eliminated. Summoned to a meeting in Brooklyn with Victor Amuso and Anthony Casso, the entire North Jersey faction, who were fearful of being massacred, went into hiding, disrupting their illegal activities. Over the next 12 months, most of the New Jersey crew members came back to the family. Amuso is to have portrayed Accetturo as a distrustful servant who was betraying his boss. Taccetta reportedly sent messages to Amuso in Brooklyn asking that a contract to be placed on Accetturo's life, so Taccetta could control the entire New Jersey faction.

=== Taccetta's arrest and trial ===
In the early 1990s, with the murder contract on his life, Accetturo was placed under federal protection after being extradited from North Carolina to New Jersey. During this time, Accetturo had little power over the New Jersey faction he had been reportedly stripped of his rank and demoted to soldier. The Taccetta brothers also had problems with their longtime rival Thomas Ricciardi who was trying to take over the faction. In 1992 the entire crew's administration Anthony Accetturo, Michael and Martin Taccetta, Thomas Ricciardi and Michael Perna were indicted on racketeering, loansharking, extortion, illegal gambling, drug trafficking, murder and conspiracy to commit murder. In 1993, when the trial began both Accetturo and Ricciardi decided to defect to the government and turn state's evidence testifying against Michael and Martin Taccetta, and Michael Perna.

On August 13, 1993, the jury convicted all three men of racketeering and Martin Taccetta was sentenced to life in prison. Michael Taccetta and Michael Perna later pleaded guilty and were sentenced on September 20, 1993, to 25 years in prison each.

During the early 2000s, the crew reported to caporegime John "Johnny Hooks" Capra who also controlled his own Harlem Bronx crew.

In 2005, Martin Taccetta won an appeal and regained his freedom, but in July 2009 the New Jersey Supreme Court reversed the lower court decision and upheld his life sentence for racketeering and extortion. Ricciardi went into the Witness Protection Program and revealed that the Racketeer Influenced and Corrupt Organizations Act (RICO) case in 1988 ended the way it did because the jury had been rigged.

=== Operation Heat ===
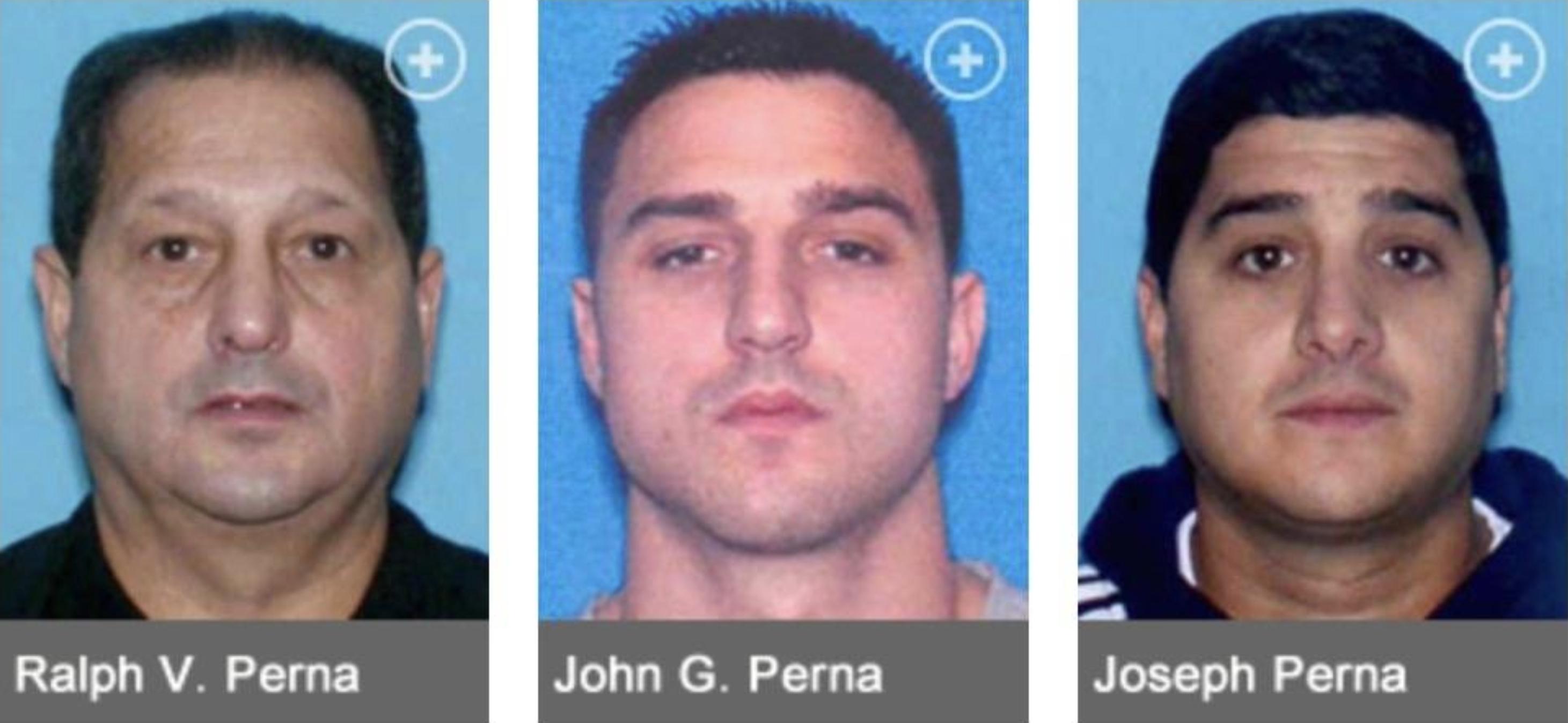
Mugshots of Ralph, John, and Joe Perna taken as part of the NJ Attorney General's "Operation Heat" prosecution in 2016

On December 18, 2007, thirty two members and associates of the Lucchese crime family's New Jersey faction were arrested on gambling, money laundering and racketeering charges. The arrests resulted from the investigation "Operation Heat" and alleged that the New Jersey faction ran an illegal gambling operation that earned approximately $2.2 billion over a 15-month period. It also revealed that members of the Lucchese family's New Jersey faction had an alliance with a New Jersey corrections officer and members of the Nine Trey Gangster's (a set of the Bloods) to smuggle drugs and pre-paid cell phones into East Jersey State Prison in Woodbridge. Those arrested were: New York capos Joseph DiNapoli and Matthew Madonna, New Jersey capo Ralph V. Perna, his three sons Joseph M. Perna, John G. Perna and Ralph M. Perna, Martin Taccetta, Michael A. Cetta (deceased 2013), John V. "Blackie" Mangrella, Alfonso "Tic" Cataldo (deceased 2013), Antonio "Curly" Russo, Elliot Porco, Gianni "John" Iacovo, James Furfaro Jr., John N. Turi, Anthony "Tony" Patrizzio, Michael T. Ramuno III, Robert A. Romano, Ron Scripps; the prison smuggling scheme involved Michael T. "Mac" Bruinton (former corrections officer), Edwin B. "Money" Spears, Dwayne E. Spears, Samuel A. Juliano (deceased 2012), Francine Hightower, and Kristen A. Gilliam; summonses were issued for: Blerim Ibraimi, George Maiorano, Vita Cetta (widow of Michael Cetta), Roseanna Perna (wife of Joseph Perna), Wayne Cross Jr.(deceased 2024) and David Ocejo.

On May 14, 2010, thirty four members and associates of the Lucchese crime family's New Jersey faction were indicted on gambling, money laundering and racketeering charges. From the original thirty two arrested in 2007, Wayne Cross Jr., David Ocejo and Astrit Hani were excluded from the indictment. The indictment did name Nicodemo Scarfo, Jr., Frank Cetta, Gary P. Medure, Michael A. Maffucci, Robert V. DeCrescenzo and Charles J. Bologna as new defendants in the case. According to the indictment Ralph Perna "allegedly became top capo of the New Jersey faction of the family when Nicky Scarfo Jr. was demoted in 2007". The indictment also stated that defendant Francine Hightower had pleaded guilty in February 2008, to conspiring to launder money in part of the prison smuggling scheme.

In May 2011, Gianni Iacovo pleaded guilty to promoting gambling. He was placed on probation and will serve no prison time. In October 2011, Michael A. Maffucci pleaded guilty to promoting gambling and could be sentenced to three to five years in state prison.

As of November 2013, three defendants in the case have died of natural causes: Alfonso T. Cataldo (died August 21, 2013), Michael A. Cetta (died June 2013) and Samuel A. Juliano (died March 2012).

In May 2015, Robert DeCrescenzo and Charles Bologna pleaded guilty to money laundering and were sentenced to two years probation. Both were arrested in 2007. Case lasted 8 years.

On September 30, 2015, Matthew Madonna was sentenced to five years in state prison and Martin Taccetta was sentenced to eight years in prison after pleading guilty to racketeering in Operation Heat.

On October 29, 2015, John Mangrella was sentenced to eight years in state prison on a guilty plea to first-degree racketeering in Operation Heat. Mangrella died on December 17, 2017.

On January 7, 2016, Ralph V. Perna received an eight-year sentence and his two sons Joseph Perna and John Perna each received 10 year sentences after pleading guilty to running a multibillion-dollar gambling enterprise. Also in January 2016, charges were dismissed against two wives Rosanna Perna, who is Joseph Perna's wife and Vita Cetta, whose husband Michael Cetta died in 2013. It was also revealed another defendant has died, Gianni Iacovo.

In February 2016, Joseph DiNapoli pleaded guilty and was sentenced to three years in prison.

=== Current position ===
In 2004, the New Jersey Commission of Investigation stated that the Lucchese crime family had about 50 members active in New Jersey. The New Jersey faction is currently led by capo Ralph Perna, who took over in 2007.

In May 2008, Martin Taccetta was indicted along with Gambino crime family capo Andrew Merola on racketeering, gambling and labor corruption. In December 2009, Taccetta was summoned to a Newark courtroom.

On March 9, 2013, Lucchese family associate Gianni Iacovo was charged with seven counts of burglary and was held on $70,000 bond at the Bergen County Jail.

On January 26, 2014, Carlo Taccetta, the son of Michael Taccetta was arrested with 65 pounds of marijuana and was charged with possession and possession with intent to distribute marijuana.

Chart of Defendants released by the New Jersey Attorney General for its April 2026 prosecution of Lucchese organized crime family members for racketeering, gambling offenses, and money laundering

On April 11, 2025, 39 members and associates of the Lucchese crime family New Jersey faction, were charged with racketeering, gambling offenses, money laundering, and other crimes. Those charged included Lucchese ruling panel member George "Georgie Neck" Zappola, captain Joseph R. "Big Joe" Perna, soldier John G. Perna, associate Wayne D. Cross among other associates which included a New Jersey Politician Prospect Park councilman Anand Shah.

On November 13, 2025, Lucchese family member Joseph "Little Joe" Perna along with thirteen others were indicted for running a multimillion New Jersey-based bookmaking and sports gambling network. Those charged alongside Joseph M. Perna, included his two sons Joseph R. Perna, and Anthony M. Perna, his stepson Frank Zito, his nephews Dominic Perna and Michael Cetta, his wife Kimberly Zito and his ex-wife Rosanna Magno among others. The network's illegal gambling profits between 2022 to 2024 was approximately $2 million.

On June 23, 2026, George Zappola, Joseph R. Perna, and John G. Perna along with associates Wayne D. Cross, Michael P. Frasso, Frank Imparato, Joseph Gossweiler and Peter Norcia all pleaded guilty for their roles in a racketeering, gambling, and money laundering operation in New Jersey. The three members of the Lucchese family George Zappola, Joseph R. Perna, and John G. Perna pleaded guilty to second-degree racketeering with recommended sentences of seven years in state prison.

== Historical leadership ==
=== Caporegimes ===
- c. 1920s–1955 – Settimo "Big Sam" Accardi – fled the country in 1955
- 1955–1964 – Biagio "Benjamin/Benny/Penooks" Pizzolato – died September 1964
  - Acting c. 1960s–1963 – Anthony "Ham" Delasco – died October 1963
- 1964–1979 – Joseph Abate – retired, died in 1994
  - Acting c. 1976–1979 – Anthony Accetturo – promoted to caporegime
- 1979–1988 – Anthony "Tumac" Accetturo – demoted, later imprisoned in 1993 and became a government witness
  - Acting c. 1980s–1988 – Michael "Mad Dog" Taccetta – promoted to caporegime
- 1988–1993 – Michael "Mad Dog" Taccetta – in 1993 sentenced to life in prison, demoted
  - Acting 1988–1991 – Michael Perna – cousin to Taccetta, imprisoned 1993
  - Acting 1991–1993 – Martin Taccetta – imprisoned 1993
- 1993–2003 – the crew reported to Caporegime Domenico Cutaia who also controlled the Vario-Cutaia Crew.
  - Acting c. 1993–1994 – Carlo Taccetta – son of Michael; demoted
  - Acting c. 1994–2003 – Robert "Bucky the Boss" Caravaggio
- 2003–2005 – the crew reported to Caporegime John "Johnny Hooks" Capra who also controlled his Harlem-Bronx crew.
  - Acting 2003–2005 – Nicodemo "Nicky" Scarfo, Jr. – promoted to caporegime
- 2005–2007 – Nicodemo "Nicky" Scarfo, Jr. – demoted
- 2007–2012 – Ralph V. "Ralphie" Perna – arrested 2007 indicted 2010, sentenced 2016
- 2012–2020 – Richard "Richie the Claw" DeLuca – died September 19, 2020
  - Acting 2017–2019 – Michael Perna – retired and died October 28, 2020
  - Acting 2019–2020 – Joseph R. "Big Joe" Perna – son of Michael
- 2020–2021 – George "Georgie Neck" Zappola – stepped down and became captain of the Brooklyn Faction.
  - Acting 2020–2021 – Joseph R. "Big Joe" Perna – promoted to caporegime
- 2021–present – Joseph R. "Big Joe" Perna – on April 11, 2025, charged with racketeering and gambling offenses
  - Acting 2025–present – Joseph M. "Little Joe" Perna – son of Ralph; on November 13, 2025, bookmaking and sports gambling

== In popular culture ==
- The 2006, Sidney Lumet film Find Me Guilty chronicles the 2-year trial of Accetturo, the Taccetta brothers and the other family members. Vin Diesel stars as Giacomo "Jackie" DiNorscio who defends himself.
- According to the Crime Library website, the Jersey Crew is the main inspiration of the DiMeo crime family in the HBO TV-show The Sopranos. Michael Taccetta is probably the inspiration to the leading role of Tony Soprano, as other real-life Jersey crew members can be recognized on the screen.
