= Find Me Guilty =

- Theatrical release poster
- Directed by: Sidney Lumet
- Written by: Sidney Lumet; T.J. Mancini; Robert J. McCrea
- Produced by: Rita Branch; Bob DeBrino; Robert Greenhut; T.J. Mancini; Roger Zamudio; Bob Yari
- Starring: Vin Diesel; Peter Dinklage; Linus Roache; Ron Silver; Annabella Sciorra; Alex Rocco
- Cinematography: Ron Fortunato
- Edited by: Tom Swartwout
- Music by: Jonathan Tunick
- Production companies: One Race Films; Yari Film Group
- Distributed by: Freestyle Releasing
- Release date: March 17, 2006
- Running time: 125 minutes
- Country: United States
- Language: English
- Budget: $13 million
- Box office: $2.6 million

Find Me Guilty is a 2006 American courtroom comedy-drama film co-written and directed by Sidney Lumet. The film is based on the true story of the longest Mafia trial in American history. Much of the courtroom dialogue was taken from the original court transcripts. Vin Diesel stars as Jackie DiNorscio, a New Jersey mobster who is on trial with 19 of his colleagues for racketeering. A wrench is thrown into the system when DiNorscio fires his lawyer and decides to represent himself. The film also stars Peter Dinklage, Linus Roache, Alex Rocco, and Ron Silver.

== Plot ==
In the mid 1980s, Lucchese crime family New Jersey faction soldier Jackie DiNorscio and 19 of his peers have been waiting a year for their federal racketeering trial to begin. While out on bail, Jackie is shot by his drug addict cousin Tony Compagna. Afraid of being killed by the extended mob family run by Nick Calabrese, Tony agrees to be a government witness for district attorney Sean Kierney. Shortly after, Jackie is arrested and sentenced to 22–30 years in prison after being set up in an unrelated drug sting by the DEA. Kierney tries to pressure Jackie into cooperating with the government against his codefendants in order to get an early release date, but Jackie flatly refuses.

Upset over the results of his previous trial, Jackie fires his lawyer and decides to represent himself. This adds to the burdens of the court, already having to deal with 20 defendants and their lawyers. Judge Sidney Finestein strongly advises against it, but lead defense attorney Ben Klandis agrees to assist Jackie. Both Klandis and Kierney recognize Jackie's ability to charm the jury, but his arrogant, vulgar behavior eventually starts irritating everyone. As revenge, Kierney arranges for Jackie to have all of his prison privileges revoked. No one is more upset than Nick, who believes Jackie will cost them the trial and threatens to sever himself from the case. As weeks turn into months, the court case evolves into a marathon affair. Kierney wants Jackie kicked off the case, but Judge Finestein reluctantly agrees to keep the trial going. Jackie realizes he has gone too far and apologizes to the judge.

Wanting to remove the possibility that even one defendant gets acquitted, Kearny offers a final plea deal to all the defendants. In return for pleading guilty, they will all get shorter sentences than they would be facing if found guilty. Jackie tells his codefendants that he refuses to take a deal even though he is already serving a long sentence for drug trafficking. This convinces Nick and the others to turn down the deal too. The final witness is Jackie's cousin Tony. Klandis is able to use Tony's heavy drug use to discredit him as a witness and Jackie emotionally cross-examines his cousin and asks why he betrayed his love for him.

After 21 months of testimony, the trial concludes with closing arguments. The prosecution and defense teams return to their homes expecting the jury to deliberate for at least a week. However, after only 14 hours of deliberation the jury returns a verdict of not guilty on all charges. While the rest of the defendants leave the courtroom with their families, Jackie returns to prison to finish his sentence. He receives a hero's welcome at the correctional facility, where fellow prisoners chant his name and reach out to shake his hand.

The end title cards explain that the real Jackie DiNorscio served 17 and a half years of his 30-year sentence before being paroled in 2002. He died of natural causes during filming.

== Cast ==
- Vin Diesel as Jackie DiNorscio
- Peter Dinklage as Ben Klandis
- Linus Roache as Sean Kierney (Samuel Alito)
- Ron Silver as Judge Sidney Finestein
- Annabella Sciorra as Bella DiNorscio
- Alex Rocco as Nick Calabrese (Anthony Accetturo)
- Jerry Adler as Rizzo
- Raúl Esparza as Tony Compagna
- Richard Portnow as Max Novardis
- Aleksa Palladino as Marina DiNorscio
- Robert Stanton as Chris Newberger
- Marcia Jean Kurtz as Sara Stiles
- Domenick Lombardozzi as Jerry McQueen
- Josh Pais as Harry Bellman
- Peter McRobbie as Peter Petraki
- Chuck Cooper as James Washington
- Frank Pietrangolare as Carlo Mascarpone (Michael Taccetta)
- Richard DeDomenico as Tom "Nappy" Napoli
- Jerry Grayson as Jimmy "The Jew" Katz
- Tony Ray Rossi as Joe Bellini
- Vinny Vella as Graziedei
- Paul Borghese as Gino Mascarpone (Martin Taccetta)
- Frank Adonis as Phil Radda
- Nick Puccio as Alessandro Tedeschi
- Frankie Perrone as Henry Fiuli
- Salvatore Paul Piro as Mike Belaggio
- James Biberi as Frank Brentano
- Oscar A. Colon as Pissaro
- Ben Lipitz as Henry Kelsey
- Steven Randazzo as Chris Cellano
- Gerry Vichi as Theodore
- Louis Guss as Court Clerk
- Gene Ruffini as Giacomo DiNorscio, Sr.
- Roger Zamudio as Octavio Juarez
- Terry Serpico as Michael Kerry
- Mark Kachersky as Agent Brandon
- Frank Lentini as Charley Kraus
- Antoni Corone as Detective
- Dennis Paladino as Sylvester
- David Brown as US Marshall #1
- Louis Mustillo as US Marshall #2
- John DiBenedetto as Jesse
- Eddie Marrero as Guard

== Reception ==
Find Me Guilty holds a 63% approval rating on review aggregator Rotten Tomatoes, based on 103 reviews with an average rating of 6.00 out of 10. The critical consensus is: "Find Me Guilty's excessive length and heavy-handed narrative keep it from reaching its full potential, but Vin Diesel's performance is well worth watching." On Metacritic, which uses a weighted average, the film holds a score of 65/100 out of 27 critics, indicating "generally favorable" reviews.

Roger Ebert gave the film three out of four stars, calling Diesel "a good choice for this role, bringing it sincerity without nobility." Ebert also praised the film's director, Lumet, who "was able to see the serious dramatic potential of Vin Diesel, dismissed as an action star, and use it for a remarkable performance."

=== Box office ===
The film did poorly at the box office; on its first weekend, it grossed only $608,804 (439 theaters, averaging $1,386 per theater). It grossed $1,173,643 in the domestic market, and $1,457,700 overseas, for a total of $2,631,343. The film's budget was $13 million, and so it was considered a box office bomb.

=== Release ===
Find Me Guilty was released in theatres on March 17, 2006. The film was released on DVD on June 27, 2006. The film was released on Blu-ray in Spain on August 31, 2011 and in the United States on October 9, 2012.

== See also ==
- List of American films of 2006
- The Jersey Crew
