= Eddie Marrero =

American actor (born 1962)

- Born: July 25, 1962 (age 64); Spanish Harlem, Manhattan, New York
- Occupations: Actor, singer, producer
- Years active: 1993 - Present

Edgardo Rafael Marrero (born July 25, 1962), known professionally as Eddie Marrero, is an American actor, singer, producer, record executive, and humanitarian.

== Bio ==
Eddie Marrero was born in Spanish Harlem's "El Barrio" to Puerto Rican parents. He began his acting career as a young child when his mother worked for Jack L. Warner, founder and Chief Executive Officer of Warner Bros. He attended the New York University Film School and the Juilliard School of Music.

Having previously acted in stage plays and musicals, his first professional acting role came in 1993 when he was cast in a non-speaking role in the film The Saint of Fort Washington. He has since worked on film, television, and theater projects, with minor roles in White Man's Burden and Kate & Leopold. He is most recently noted for his supporting role in Find Me Guilty, directed by Sidney Lumet.

In television, Marrero first appeared in Sidney Lumet's A&E drama 100 Centre Street, following Lumet's satisfaction with Marrero's performance in Find Me Guilty. Since then, Eddie Marrero has appeared on the Late Show with David Letterman and in the mini-series Miracle's Boys for Nickelodeon’s The N. His other television credits include NBC's Third Watch, as well as Law & Order: Criminal Intent in the episode “Sex Club”. On stage, Eddie Marrero starred in the world premiere Off-Broadway play "La Lupe: My Life My Destiny" along with Puerto Rican soap star Sully Diaz.

In recent years, Eddie Marrero has shifted his focus to music, releasing his first EP Album, Eddie Marrero, Con Amor in 2013, a tribute album to musical icon Frank Sinatra. Sung entirely in Spanish, Eddie covers some classic hits like All The Way, All Of Me, I've Got You Under My Skin, My Way. In 2016, he followed up with his sophomore release, Timeless Christmas, a holiday album that has gained traction on iHeart Radio and Spotify, among others. In 2019, he released his first music video, to The Christmas Song.

Presently, Marrero operates ERM Entertainment, Inc., a music and film corporation that produces independent artists, films, and commercial projects.

In 1997, he founded the Umoja Youth Project, a youth gospel choir. He is also the founder and producing artistic director of Three Lions Stage.

== See also ==
- List of Puerto Ricans
