= Victor Amuso =

New York mobster (born 1934)

Vic Amuso
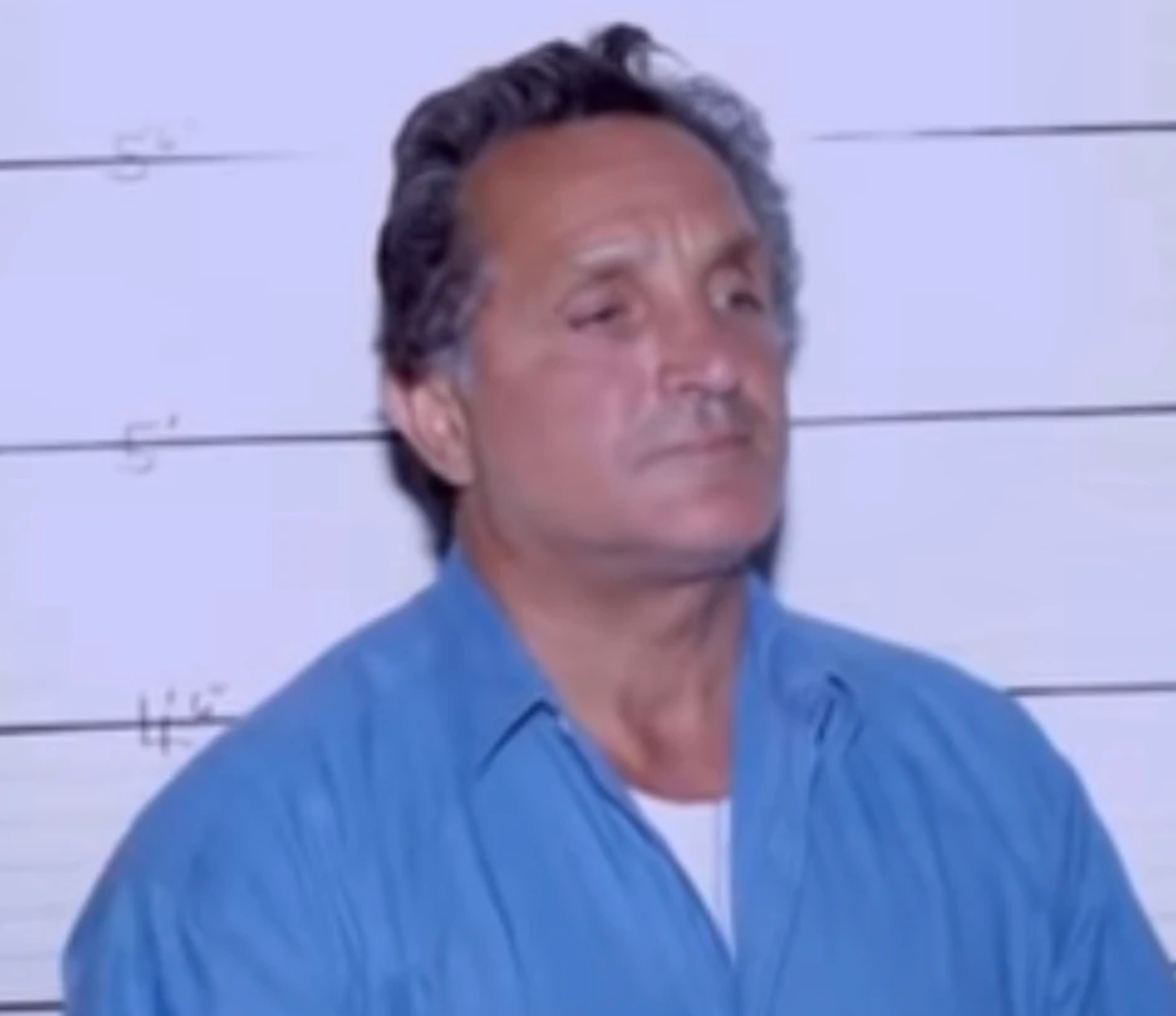
- Amuso's 1992 FBI mugshot
- Born: Vittorio Amuso; November 4, 1934 (age 91); New York City, New York, U.S.
- Other names: "Little Vic"; "The Deadly Don"
- Occupation: Crime boss
- Predecessor: Anthony Corallo
- Spouse: Barbara
- Children: 1
- Status: Incarcerated
- Allegiance: Lucchese crime family
- Convictions: Murder, conspiracy to commit murder, extortion, racketeering (1992)
- Penalty: Life imprisonment (1992)

Details
- Imprisoned at: Federal Correctional Complex, Butner

Vittorio "Little Vic" Amuso (born November 4, 1934) is an American mobster and the boss of the Lucchese crime family. He was described as "The Deadly Don" by Assistant United States Attorney Charles Rose. Amuso's reign is considered one of the bloodiest periods in American Mafia history during the late 1980s and early 1990s, alongside his former underboss and close protégé Anthony Casso, who turned informer against him in 1994. Since the death of Colombo crime family boss Carmine Persico in March 2019, Amuso is currently the longest-serving crime family boss of the Five Families, dating back to 1987. Amuso has been serving a life sentence on murder and racketeering charges since 1992, and is currently incarcerated at the Federal Correctional Complex, Butner in North Carolina. He is the younger brother of Robert Amuso an ex Lucchese Caporegime with operations in Brooklyn, Queens and Florida, they are the sons of Giuseppe Amuso who owned a tailorshop and Theresa Petrelli

== Early life ==
Vittorio Amuso was born November 4, 1934, and grew up in Canarsie, Brooklyn. In the late 1940s, he was introduced to Anthony "Tony Ducks" Corallo, a prominent caporegime in the Gagliano crime family, a forerunner of the Lucchese crime family. Amuso acted as a bodyguard and chauffeur for Carmine "Gribbs" Tramunti.

Amuso was married to Barbara, and the couple had one daughter, Victoria. They live in Howard Beach, Queens.

== Colombo crime family ==
=== Enforcer for Gallo ===
Amuso later became an enforcer for Profaci crime family mobster, Joseph "Crazy Joe" Gallo, in Brooklyn. In the early 1960s, the Gallo brothers declared war against longtime crime boss Giuseppe "Joe" Profaci and the old Profaci faction of the family, because Profaci had cut into Gallo's profits. Amuso would allegedly kill several members of the Profaci faction, but was sent to prison sometime in the early 1960s, along with Joey Gallo and a dozen others, for extortion charges.

After Joe Gallo's release from prison in early 1971, he continued his war against the family on June 28, 1971, when boss Joseph Colombo was shot. Months later, on April 7, 1972, Joe Gallo was shot to death in Little Italy, Manhattan, while he was celebrating his 43rd birthday. Many Colombo crime family members, especially those from the old Gallo crew, defected to other crime families. Amuso went to the Lucchese family sometime during that year, as an associate in the "19th Hole Crew," whose capo was Christopher "Christie Tick" Furnari.

== Lucchese crime family ==
=== Associate ===
Amuso became one of Furnari's top protégés along with Anthony "Gaspipe" Casso. On December 21, 1972, Amuso was arrested by police outside the "House on Morgan Avenue," a front for the "Bronx Connection" kickback scheme, selling prison paroles for as high as $20,000 to prison inmates. Presumably to meet with the building owner, Richard Curro, a city corrections officer and Lucchese family associate, who acted as liaison between inmates and the Luccheses, Amuso was in possession of a switchblade and a file folder of parole documents at the time of his arrest.

=== Made man to prison ===
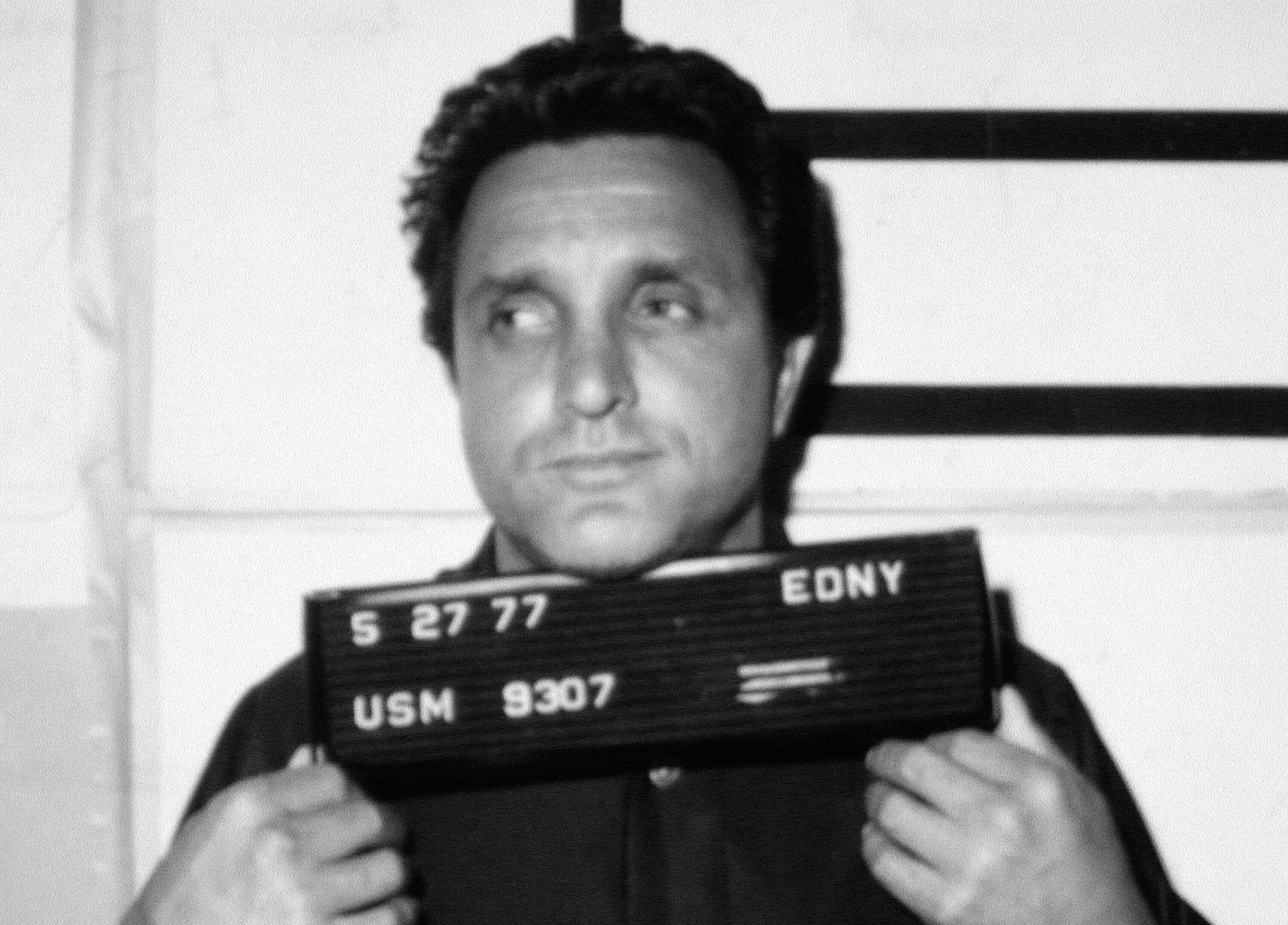
Amuso's May 27, 1977 U.S. Marshals Service mugshot

In 1977, Amuso became a "made man" in the Lucchese family through the sponsorship of then Lucchese caporegime Chris (Christy Tick) Furnari. On May 30, 1977, Amuso was arrested with Casso, for their involvement in a drug trafficking ring smuggling heroin from Bangkok. At the time of the Brooklyn mobsters' arrest, he had been found with three pounds of heroin in his possession. Reportedly, the heroin operation was headed by Amuso, his cooperator Casso, and two other associates of the Lucchese family. They were all sent to prison.

Furnari was promoted to consigliere in 1980, and Amuso succeeded him as capo. Furnari wanted Casso to succeed him, but Casso preferred to become Furnari's aide-de-camp; a consigliere is allowed to have one soldier work for him directly.

=== Murder of Frank DeCicco ===
On April 13, 1986, the underboss of the Gambino crime family, Frank DeCicco, was killed when a bomb placed under his car went off. The bomb had been planted by Herbert Pate, while Amuso, Casso, and Vic's brother Robert watched from a parked car. The target was allegedly Gambino boss John Gotti, who earlier, with DeCicco, had organized the murder of former boss Paul Castellano, without the permission of the Commission. Reportedly, Amuso and Casso, along with Genovese crime family boss Vincent "Chin" Gigante, had planned Gotti's execution, but killed DeCicco by mistake. Although Casso later testified that both he and Amuso had conspired with Gigante, this was never raised at the trial, because Casso was dropped from the Witness Protection Program many years later.

=== Murder of Anthony Luongo ===
On February 15, 1985, Corallo, Furnari and underboss Salvatore "Tom Mix" Santoro were indicted in the Mafia Commission Trial, along with the top major heads of the Five Families. To replace him, Corallo put his protégé Anthony "Buddy" Luongo as acting boss sometime in early 1986. However, around December of that same year, Luongo disappeared because he and Salvatore (Tom Mix) Santoro then Corallo´s underboss plotted to take control of the family. Luongo was attracted to a meeting with Vic, Robert (Vic´s brother) and Anthony Casso (which at that time was the caporegime of the 19th hole crew) in an apartment of the soldier of the Genovese crime family Dominick (Swaggy) Carlucci, where he was shot until he was killed. His car was found at JFK International Airport in Queens

By late 1986, Corallo realized that he, Santoro and Furnari were headed for convictions that would send them to prison for life. To avoid internal war and keep up the family's tradition of a peaceful transfer of power, Corallo summoned Amuso and Casso to a meeting at Furnari's house, and decided that one of them would succeed him as boss. Furnari then met with his two protègés and told them to decide which one would take the mantle. They ultimately decided that it should be Amuso. He was named acting boss later in 1986, and the new official boss on January 13, 1987, when Corallo and others were sentenced to life imprisonment.

== Boss of the Lucchese family ==
In February 1987, Peter "Fat Pete" Chiodo, a member of the "19th Hole" crew, was inducted into the Lucchese family. Robert Amuso and Frank Lastorino brought Chiodo to the ceremony, which was presided over by Vic and held above a Brooklyn funeral home.

In the spring of that year, Furnari Jr. was soon demoted and sidelined by order of Vic . Cooperating witness Burt Kaplan—a former associate of Furnari who began cooperating with law enforcement in 2005—later testified: "Furnari's son was given a position when Furnari went to prison, but he didn't get along with Anthony Casso... Casso told me that Chris's son would visit him and, upon returning, would tell Vic and Gas, 'My father said this and my father said that,' and there was no truth to it. The father never sent any such messages."

In late 1987, Alfonso D'Arco—then a soldier—received an order from Vic to convey a message to Lucchese captain Anthony "Curly" Russo, instructing him to meet Robert Amuso at the Walnut Bar in Canarsie this bar served as the headquarters for the 19th Hole crew.

Around late May or June 1988, Vic Amuso promoted Peter Chiodo and Alfonso D'Arco to the rank of captain during a meeting held in the basement of a home near the Walnut Bar. Chiodo received a portion of Robert Amuso's crew—including associates Thomas Carew, Michael DeSantis, and Richard Pagliarulo—and soon sponsored the latter two for membership. In August of this year, he and Anthony Casso inducted six new members into the Lucchese family—Anthony "Big Tony" Calagna, George "Goggles" Conte, Joseph D'Arco, Anthony Senter, Joseph Testa, and Joseph "Jo Jo" Truncale—in the basement of the home of Genovese family member Dominick Carlucci and all of them were assigned to the crew of his brother.

In October 1989, Robert Amuso visited Joseph "Little Joe" DeFede—a direct associate of Robert's brother, Vic—at The Liberty Lounge in Ozone Park. DeFede later testified: "[Vic] put me on what we call his list—I was being proposed for membership—and I didn't know exactly when [until Bobby] called me to go... [Bobby] told me to get dressed. This was on a Saturday; he said to get dressed and that someone would pick me up on Monday. They did, and they dropped me off at a restaurant in Canarsie; I met other people there, and then we went to Brooklyn." DeFede was taken by Lucchese associate James McCann to The Pier restaurant in Canarsie. From there, he and others were taken to a residence on Farragut Road where the ceremony took place. (The house was owned by the son-in-law of Lucchese soldier Peter 'Rugsy' Vario—identified by cooperating witness Alfonso D'Arco as Albanese. This could be Lucchese associate Anthony 'Tony Shape' Albanese.) The ceremony was presided over by boss Vic Amuso and consigliere Anthony Casso. Others inducted alongside DeFede were Michael DeSantis, Frank "Frankie Pearl" Federico, Richard Pagliarulo, and Frank "Frankie Bones" Papagni. DeFede and Papagni were assignated to the crew of Robert Amuso while the others were assignated to the crew of Frank Lastorino

=== The Windows case ===
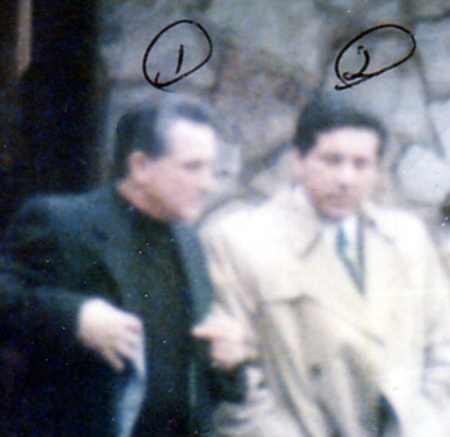
FBI surveillance photograph of Amuso (left) with underboss, Anthony Casso (right).

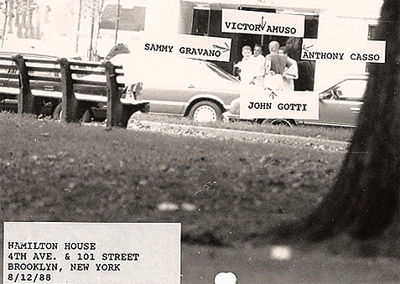
FBI surveillance photograph of Amuso, Casso, Gotti and Gravano

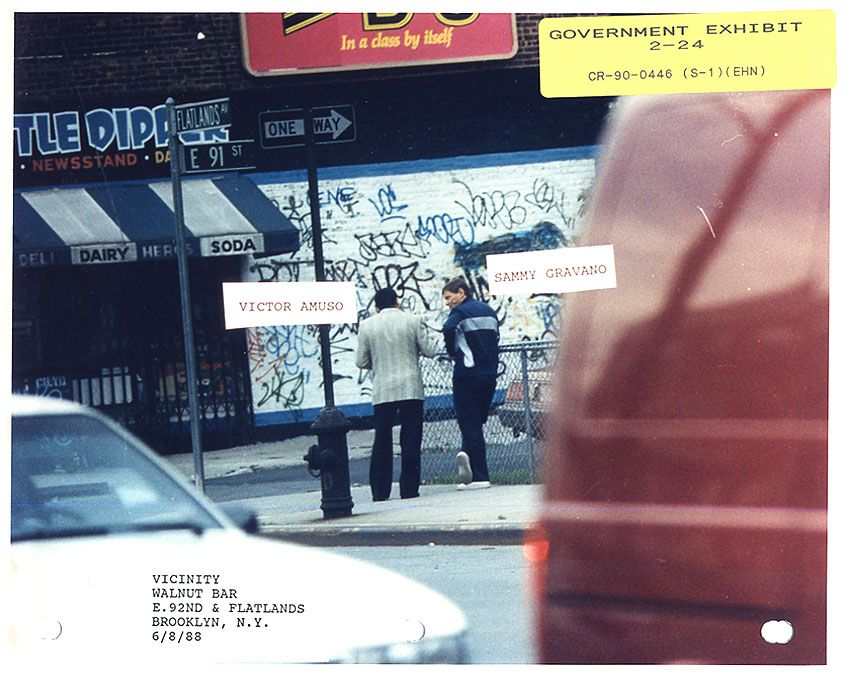
FBI surveillance photograph dated June 6, 1988 of Amuso and Gambino crime family underboss Sammy Gravano

From 1978 to 1990, four of the five crime families of New York, including the Lucchese family, rigged bids for 75 percent of $191 million, or about $142 million, of the window contracts awarded by the New York City Housing Authority. Installation companies were required to make union payoffs of between $1 and $2 for each window installed.

=== Dispute with Accetturo ===
The bloodletting only increased after Amuso named Casso as his underboss in 1988. Toward the late 1980s, Amuso and Casso began arguing with Anthony "Tumac" Accetturo, head of the family's powerful New Jersey faction, "The Jersey Crew," about the profit that Accetturo sent to the family administration. Accetturo had only been sending $50,000 a year to New York, but Amuso and Casso wanted half of the Jersey Crew's yearly take. When Accetturo refused, Amuso stripped him of his rank.

In the fall of 1988, the entire Jersey Crew was summoned to meet with Amuso in Brooklyn. Ten of the crew's members showed up for the meeting. However, fearing that they were being set up to be killed, they all abruptly drove off. In a fury, Amuso ordered the entire Jersey Crew killed—the now-infamous "whack Jersey" order. Soon, the entire New Jersey crew had gone into hiding, decimating the Lucchese interests in New Jersey. Amuso and Casso went on to eliminate anyone on even the merest suspicion that they might be defectors or if they were considered potential rivals. Over the next 12 months, most of the New Jersey crew members returned to the family. Amuso told the crew members who came back that Accetturo was an outlaw and needed to be disposed of. Amuso sent hitmen to Florida to search for Accetturo. However, what Amuso didn't realize was that Accetturo was jailed in New Jersey for refusing to testify in front of a state panel. Accetturo would later become an informant. Accetturo's former protégé and longtime rival, Michael "Mad Dog" Taccetta, who was also despised by Amuso, reputedly took over Lucchese Jersey Crew, the nickname of their faction in Northern New Jersey, toward his conviction in 1993, before Accetturo eventually agreed to become an informant.

=== Fugitives and convictions ===
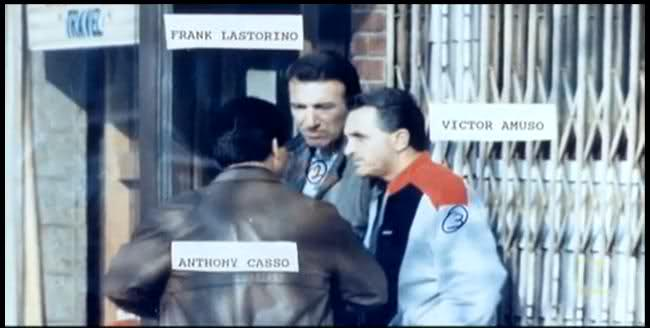
FBI surveillance photograph of Amuso, Anthony Casso and Frank Lastorino

On May 30, 1990, Amuso and Casso were indicted as part of the Windows Case racketeering investigation. Acting on prior knowledge, Amuso and Casso went into hiding. Amuso named Alphonse "Little Al" D'Arco as acting boss. But the bloodshed of Vic Amuso and Tony Casso wasn't over yet, as Lucchese caporegime Peter "Fat Pete" Chiodo was charged with violations of the RICO act in 1991.

Suspecting that Chiodo had turned informer, Amuso decided to have Chiodo killed. On May 8, 1991, three gunmen shot Chiodo 12 times, but failed to kill him. A few weeks later, Amuso sent word to Chiodo's attorneys that his wife had been marked for death. This violated a longstanding Mafia rule that women are not to be harmed. Later, a hit team nearly killed Chiodo's sister. The move backfired spectacularly, as Chiodo became a government informant and agreed to testify against several major heads of the Five Families, including Amuso, that same year. Chiodo revealed details of the entire Windows Case operation, several murder and conspiracy charges, loansharking and extortion, as well as money laundering and drug trafficking operations around Queens, Brooklyn, Manhattan and the Bronx.

Amuso issued several other orders that led many inside and outside the Lucchese family to conclude he was no longer acting rationally. He and Casso crafted a list of 49 people that they wanted dead—half of whom were Lucchese made men. He also ordered D'Arco to bring in a bomb expert from the Philadelphia crime family as part of a plan to blow up Gambino boss John Gotti. Amuso then turned his wrath on D'Arco, whom he held responsible for the failed hit on Chiodo. He effectively demoted D'Arco by naming a four-man panel to run the family in his absence.

On July 29, 1991, FBI agents captured Amuso at a suburban mall outside Scranton, Pennsylvania. There were strong indications that the FBI had been tipped off by someone with knowledge of the clandestine telephone system Amuso used to pass on orders. Shortly afterward, D'Arco was set up to be killed at a meeting of top Lucchese leaders at a Manhattan hotel. D'Arco spotted a man carrying a gun under his shirt. The man later went to the bathroom—and when he came out, the gun was gone. Realizing that the next guy to come out of the bathroom would likely come out shooting, D'Arco fled for his life and turned state's evidence. His testimony, and that of Chiodo and many others, proved to be devastating to Amuso's case. In a separate racketeering trial, Amuso was convicted of all 54 charges on June 15, 1991, including nine murders. On October 9, 1992, Amuso was sentenced to life imprisonment.

Casso managed to remain free for two more years until he himself was apprehended in 1993. By then, Amuso had been seething over the circumstances of his arrest for some time, and had come to believe that Casso had tipped off the FBI in hopes of seizing the boss' mantle for himself. In late 1993, Amuso removed Casso as underboss and decreed that all Lucchese mafiosi should consider him a pariah—in effect, banishing his comrade of some three decades from the family. Casso responded by turning informer himself. After the incarcerations of both Amuso and Casso, the U.S. government learned that they each had, allegedly, ordered more than 10–12 slayings while they were fugitives and while on trial, using two corrupt NYPD detectives, Louis Eppolito and Stephen Caracappa, as their personal hit men.

== List of murders committed/ordered by the Amuso administration ==
Name	Date	Rank	Reason
Anthony "Buddy" Luongo	November 1986	Captain	Shot and killed by Casso and Amuso after either Corallo or Amuso and Casso feared Luongo was going to attempt overthrow of the Lucchese family.
Nicholas Guido	December 25, 1986	Civilian	Mistakenly identified as being involved with the attempted hit on Anthony Casso. Joseph Testa was the alleged shooter outside Guido's mother's house.
Carmine Varriale/Frank Santoro	September 3, 1987	Soldier & Associate	Killed outside a social club in Bath Beach, Brooklyn, because he had tried to avenge his brother's murder. 51 year old Lucchese associate Frank Santoro was also killed. The hit team consisted of Frank Smith Sr, Frank Smith Jr, and Michael Cilone.
John Otto Heidel	October 1987	Associate	Shot to death in Oct 1987 while fixing a flat tire on his car after it was believed he was cooperating with law enforcement.
Joseph Martino	1988	Associate	Suffocated to death after suspected he was cooperating with law enforcement.
Eustachio "Leo" Giammona	June 1988	Soldier	Shot to death while sitting behind the steering wheel of his car, driving along West 3rd Street in Brooklyn. He was a drug trafficker and related to John Gambino.
Sorecho "Sammy the Arab" Nalo	October 25, 1988	Associate	Associate of the Rochester crime family and Pierre Hotel robbery organizer, shot to death in his travel agency office in October 1988 by several Lucchese soldiers after he was interfering in a Lucchese family-run illegal gambling racket.
Thomas "Red" Gilmore	February 6, 1989	Associate	Associate of Lucchese captain Paul Vario, shot to death by former Lucchese acting boss Louis Daidone and Patty Dellorusso. He ordered Alfonse D'Arco's murder because he suspected that he was an informant and that he robbed the house of his brother Robert, Gilmore was shot outside his residence in Ozone Park
Michael Pappadio	May 13, 1989	Soldier	Bludgeoned and shot to death by Al D'Arco and accomplice after keeping "kick-up" money to himself. Pappadio was responsible for monitoring the Lucchese family's interests in New York City's garment centre.
Robert Kubecka/Donald Barstow	August 11, 1989	Civilian	Two businessmen fatally shot by Frankie "Pearls" Federico and Rocco Vitulli. Their murders were approved by Casso and Amuso and tasked to Lucchese captain Sal Avellino, who in turn assigned them to two of his soldiers within the crew. Kubecka had testified against extortion attempts targeted at his business.
John Petrucelli	September 13, 1989	Soldier	Shot to death after the hiding of Gus Farace, an associate of the Bonanno crime family who was suspected of killing a Drug Enforcement Administration agent, infuriated Amuso. Anthony Magana and Joseph Cosentino were in 1991 found guilty of this murder.
Anthony DiLapi	February 4, 1990	Soldier	As he strolled into the underground garage of his Hollywood apartment, he was shot and killed as it was feared he had become an informant.
Michael Salerno	June 5, 1990	Captain	His body was found in the trunk of his Jaguar car, with a gunshot wound to the chest and stabbed in the neck. He was suspected of being an informer.

== Imprisoned Lucchese boss ==
=== New Lucchese acting boss ===
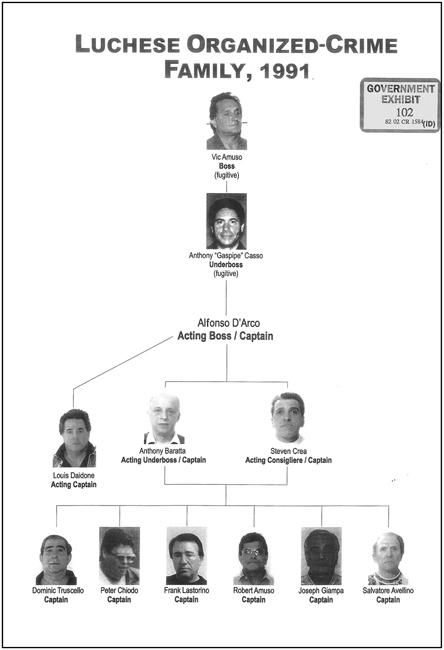
Lucchese crime family - Chart 1991

After Amuso's indictment in 1991 with the testimony provided by former acting boss Alphonse "Little Al" D'Arco, Amuso promoted his caporegime Joseph "Little Joe" DeFede, to acting boss, with the help of the Ruling Panel members, Steven "Wonderboy" Crea, Anthony "Bowat" Baratta, Salvatore "Sal" Avellino and consigliere Frank "Big Frank" Lastorino in 1991. It was around this time that Lastorino used the indictments of Amuso and Anthony "Gaspipe" Casso to take advantage of the situation and gained much of the authority in the family when he aligned himself with Brooklyn faction leaders George "Georgie Neck" Zappola, Frank "Bones" Papagni, Frank Gioia Jr. and George Conte.

=== Fearing rivalry from Bronx ===
In early 1992, Amuso feared that rivalry was being developed in the Lucchese crime family, as some mobsters thought, with Amuso out of the way, that they could take over. The rivals were the old Bronx faction of the family, and Amuso felt he had to prove that he was still in charge. On April 3, 1992, Aniello "Neil" Migliore, one of the most powerful capos of the family, was celebrating the birthday of a friend's granddaughter in a Westbury, New York restaurant on Long Island. During the party, a gunman in a passing car fired one or two shotgun blasts through the restaurant window, hitting Migliore in the head and chest. Despite his wounds, Migliore survived. The attempt on his life did not sway Migliore away from the crime family, though, as he kept operating throughout the 1990s.

=== Bronx & Brooklyn rivalry ===
As Amuso allegedly attempted to kill Aniello "Neil" Migliore from the Bronx faction in 1992, he chose another Bronx faction-leader named Steven "Wonderboy" Crea as the new and powerful underboss of the Lucchese crime family to keep rivals from the Bronx in line. However, this decision almost triggered a new war within the crime family, as Crea, along with Joseph "Little Joe" DeFede decided to turn the family's power center away from Brooklyn, New York, and back to the Bronx faction where it had been for decades. This, however, didn't please the imprisoned boss Vic Amuso and his supporters within the Brooklyn faction. Crime family consigliere, Frank "Big Frank" Lastorino sought to organize the murder of Steven Crea using capos George Zappola, Frank Papagni and Frank Gioia Jr., and would further plan to use the death of acting boss Steve Crea to gain the control of the Lucchese crime family. U.S. law enforcement also recognized these members as the actual leaders of the family at the time, and even picked them up on wires and bugs saying they were going to kill Gambino crime family boss John "Junior" Gotti, son of John Gotti, and his rival Nicholas "Little Nick" Corozzo to split up the Gambinos. This conspiracy also included Genovese crime family boss Vincent "Chin" Gigante and on-the-lam leader, Anthony "Gaspipe" Casso before he was apprehended. But due to massive indictments of the time, slashing all members of the three families involved in the conspiracy, the plot never succeeded, and Amuso continued to run the family from prison as most of the conspirators themselves were sent to prison.

=== Restructure of the family ===
In September 1993, several members of the Lucchese family were summoned to testify to their loyalty to the imprisoned boss. Among those summoned were captain Robert Amuso, soldier Joseph DeFede, soldier Frank Gioia Jr., and associate Oscar Ansourian.

During the mid-1990s, the majority of the Brooklyn faction leaders, many of whom were known Amuso's rivals, were sent to prison on various charges. To keep some sense of stability within the Lucchese crime family, Amuso promoted his loyal friend and Brooklyn capo Louis "Louie Bagels" Daidone to the position of consigliere, replacing Frank Lastorino. Amuso also kept Joseph "Little Joe" DeFede as the crime family's acting boss. DeFede oversaw important crime family operations such as those in the Garment District, which brought in between $40,000 to $60,000 a month. Amuso kept Stephen "Wonderboy" Crea of the Bronx as the underboss, overseeing the construction and union racketeering operations that made the crime family between $300,000 and $500,000 a month. Daidone was put in control of the crews and street soldiers that took care of all the debt collection and muscle work, basically the collection of gambling and loansharking debts, the extortion operations and allegedly murder for hire. After Daidone was promoted to the number three spot, Long Island caporegime Joseph "Joe C." Caridi stepped up to run Daidone's former crew.

=== Joe DeFede's imprisonment ===
On April 28, 1998, DeFede was indicted on nine counts of racketeering stemming from his supervision of the crime family rackets in New York's Garment District from 1992 to 1997. The prosecution reported that since the mid-1980s the Lucchese crime family had been grossing between $40,000 and $60,000 per month from the Garment District rackets they controlled. In December 1998, DeFede pleaded guilty to the charges and received five years in prison. Angry at his guilty plea, Amuso became uncertain of DeFede's loyalty to the crime family and, in the future, Amuso would regard DeFede as a traitor and thief.

=== Wonderboy's enormous profit ===
After the imprisonment of Joe DeFede in 1998, Amuso handpicked Bronx faction leader, Steven "Wonderboy" Crea as the new acting boss of the Lucchese crime family. Crea, a loyal Amuso underboss, began sending a larger amount of the crime family's profits to the imprisoned boss, which convinced Amuso that DeFede had been skimming profits from the crime family the whole time he was acting boss. Amuso decided to put out a contract on DeFede's life in late 1999. On September 6, 2000, Crea and seven other Lucchese members were arrested and jailed on extortion charges. Crea was eventually convicted in 2001 and sentenced to five years in prison. Steven Crea was released from prison in 2006.

=== Daidone, DeFede and D'Arco ===
Following the imprisonment of Crea in 2001, influential consigliere, Louis "Louie Bagels" Daidone was promoted to acting boss and began to run the day-to-day operations of the crime family. Daidone, at the time one of the strongest and most dangerous family members, would continue to oversee the contract ordered by Amuso on imprisoned former acting boss Joseph "Little Joe" DeFede. DeFede did not know that Amuso had placed a contract on his life but, during DeFede's imprisonment, he was demoted from capo to soldier and this alerted him to the possibility that he had fallen out of favor with boss Vic Amuso and could be in serious trouble. Upon DeFede's release from prison on February 5, 2002, it was reported that the former Amuso ally immediately turned to the government for help and became an informant. Federal witnesses Joe DeFede and Alphonse "Little Al" D'Arco gave the U.S. government information regarding Lucchese controlled racketeering operations based around New York City, which helped the federal government continue their decimation of the old Amuso-faction.

Both D'Arco and DeFede also provided information about rackets such as gambling, loansharking, extortion and even information about some old murders, which led to the indictments of Mafia cops, Louis Eppolito and Stephen Caracappa. Eppolito and Caracappa were allegedly working for and taking large bribes from former Lucchese underboss Anthony "Gaspipe" Casso since the 1980s. The two highly decorated NYPD officers were apparently used by Casso and the Lucchese crime family to gain valuable information about ongoing police investigations and cases concerning New York Mafia member. The two bad cops were also used to lure rivals and possible government informants to their deaths and, in some cases, they apparently executed the victims themselves. Daidone received a life sentence in 2003 on racketeering and murder charges, while more than a dozen other prominent Lucchese crime family members were sent to prison during that same year on various charges.

=== The Committee/Ruling Panel ===
After the conviction and imprisonment of acting boss Louie Diadone in 2003, Amuso instituted a new ruling panel/committee of influential capos to oversee and run the crime family's day-to-day activities. Prominent and senior Lucchese capos Aniello "Neil" Migliore, Matthew "Matt" Madonna and Joseph "Joey Dee" DiNapoli were handpicked by Amuso to lead the crime family. These senior capos were chosen as street bosses to work in tandem. Instead of placing one particular member in the official underboss position, Amuso divided the power between three influential capos. Migliore, a former Corallo loyalist and Amuso rival, is now said to be one of the most powerful mobsters in the Lucchese crime family.

=== Crea returns to leadership ===
In 2006, former acting boss Stephen "Wonderboy" Crea was released from prison, and the ruling panel/committee continued to run day-to-day activities of the crime family. In late 2009, ruling panel members Madonna and DiNapoli were indicted on labor racketeering, illegal gambling and extortion charges. In 2009, Steven Crea took over as acting boss of the crime family.

As of July 2014, Amuso remains the official boss of the Lucchese crime family. Amuso is serving his life sentence at Federal Correctional Institution, Cumberland, a federal correctional facility in Maryland on murder and racketeering charges. His Register Number is 38740–079. According to another Mafia historian, Selwyn Raab, Amuso's bloodthirsty tactics resulted in the loss of more than half the family's made members either as a result of being killed, imprisoned or turning informant.

=== Brooklyn's DeSantis ===
In May 2019, government witness and former Lucchese soldier John Pennisi testified in the trial against Eugene Castelle and revealed the current leadership of the crime family. Pennisi testified that in 2017, imprisoned for life boss Vic Amuso sent a letter to Underboss Steven Crea which stated that Brooklyn based mobster Michael "Big Mike" DeSantis would take over as acting boss replacing Bronx based Matthew Madonna. The testimony from Pennisi stated that if the Bronx faction refused to step aside, imprisoned boss Amuso had approved of a hit list that included a captain and several members of the Bronx faction. During Pennisi's testimony, he revealed that the Lucchese family operates with a total of seven crews - two in The Bronx, two on Long Island, one in Manhattan, one in New Jersey, and Castellucci's-Brooklyn crew (formerly Amuso-Casso's old crew) which is now based in Tottenville section of Staten Island. Law-enforcement agents have stated that Brooklyn based mobster Patty "Red" Dellorusso is the new acting underboss and that The Bronx-based mobster Andrew DeSimone is the new Consigliere.

American Mafia
Preceded by Anthony Corallo	Lucchese crime family Boss; 1986-present	Incumbent
