= Anthony Accetturo =

American mobster (born 1938)

- Born: February 14, 1938 (age 88); Orange, New Jersey, U.S.
- Other name: "Tumac"
- Occupations: Mobster; government witness
- Spouse: Geraldine Accetturo
- Allegiance: Lucchese crime family
- Conviction: Racketeering (1993)
- Penalty: 20 years' imprisonment (1994)

Anthony "Tumac" Accetturo (born February 14, 1938) is an American former mobster who was caporegime of the New Jersey faction of the Lucchese crime family, popularly called "The Jersey Crew." Accetturo was demoted as leader of the Jersey Crew after falling afoul of Lucchese family leaders Vittorio "Vic" Amuso and Anthony "Gaspipe" Casso. With a murder contract placed upon the lives of him, his son and his wife, and facing a lengthy prison sentence after being convicted of racketeering, Accetturo became a cooperating government witness in 1993.

== Criminal career ==
Accetturo was born in 1938 in Orange, New Jersey. The son of Sicilian immigrants, his father was a butcher, his mother a seamstress. Accetturo dropped out of school after completing the sixth grade. At age 16, Accetturo moved to Newark and became the leader of a large street gang. He gained a reputation as a ferocious street fighter, which led several of his fellow gang members to call him "Tumac," after the caveman hero of the 1940 adventure film One Million B.C.

At age 17, Accetturo was recruited by Anthony "Ham" Delasco, the boss of the Jersey Crew. By the early 1960s, he had become Delasco's driver. Accetturo became Delasco's protégé, learning his trade in illegal gambling and loansharking, which allowed him subsequent control of the Newark area. Delasco died in the late 1960s, and Accetturo became a major earner under his successor, Joseph Abate, as well as a major player in his own right in the New Jersey underworld. He soon grew rich in the family, netting about $500,000 yearly.

=== New Jersey crew ===
In 1970, Accetturo moved to Florida to avoid an investigation of his gambling operations in Newark. Another reason for his move was that South Florida was open to all the crime families for exploitation. In the early 1970s, Abate went into semi-retirement, and Lucchese boss Anthony "Tony Ducks" Corallo put Accetturo in charge of the entire Lucchese operation in New Jersey. The membership books of the Mafia had been closed since 1957, which meant that Accetturo was not an official member yet. This made his promotion even more remarkable, since Corallo chose him over several made men who had previously been his superiors. Nonetheless, in the eyes of Corallo, Abate, and the family leadership, Accetturo represented the Mafia ideal: loyal, trustworthy, and a good earner. During his absence, Accetturo designated his lieutenant, Michael "Mad Dog" Taccetta of Florham Park, to run the day-to-day operations of the crew.

In 1976, with Abate as his sponsor, Accetturo finally became a made man in the Lucchese crime family, along with the Taccetta brothers, Michael and Martin. Accetturo described getting inducted into the family as “the greatest honor of [his] life” at the time. He recalled that his ceremony was somewhat less elaborate than was normally the case for someone who was due to become “a friend of ours.” Although the ceremony—spilling a drop of blood on a picture of a saint, and burning it—was ostensibly secret, its broad lines were very well known in the Italian-American community. Accetturo was thus surprised when Corallo simply told him to burn a picture of a saint, and swear not to betray the Lucchese family. He later found out that the top leadership of the family thought so highly of him that they felt they could dispense with the usual formalities. Accetturo would finally become the official boss of the Jersey Crew by 1979 when Abate retired.

In February 1973, Accetturo was indicted for loansharking and extortion. He was eventually arrested in Miami, with his bail set at $10,000. In 1976, the State of New Jersey tried to extradite Accetturo from Florida, however, he fended off the order due to poor health. Based in Hollywood, Florida, Accetturo would continue to elude federal authorities while remaining involved in Lucchese interests in New Jersey.

In 1980, the murder of Philadelphia crime family boss Angelo "The Gentle Don" Bruno created a power vacuum in that family, with rivals Philip Testa and Nicodemo Scarfo fighting for control. The Lucchese and Genovese crime families were able to expand their presence in Atlantic City and southern New Jersey during the years of infighting in the Philadelphia crime family.

On August 22, 1985, Accetturo and 25 other Lucchese members and associates were indicted in Newark on federal racketeering charges related to gambling, loansharking, credit card fraud, and cocaine and marijuana trafficking. On October 18, 1985, Accetturo was indicted on charges of threatening government witnesses and posing a threat to public safety. He was later charged with intimidating competitors of the Lucchese-controlled Taccetta Group Enterprises, along with credit card and wire fraud. Facing a number of federal prosecutions, Accetturo was granted a stay of sentence and was allowed to live in his Florida residence.

In early 1987, Accetturo, Taccetta, and several other Jersey Crew members went on trial for narcotics and racketeering charges. The 21-month trial became one of the longest in U.S. history. When the verdict was read on August 26, 1988, the defendants were pronounced not guilty on all counts, a stunning rebuke to the government. As it turned out, however, the trial had been compromised by jury tampering—a common problem for Mafia trials. When the Luccheses got word that the nephew of an unidentified Jersey Crew capo was on the jury, they paid him $100,000 to vote for acquittal. Accetturo thus went into the courtroom knowing he was assured of at least a hung jury.

During the RICO trial, the relationship between Accetturo and Taccetta deteriorated into an outright power struggle. Taccetta was jealous of the rise of Accetturo's son, Anthony Accetturo Jr., within the New Jersey crew. Taccetta also felt that the senior Accetturo had given him very little respect and deference over the years that he had been watching over the New Jersey operation.

Finally, Taccetta ordered a murder contract on the elder Accetturo. When the trial ended in acquittals for the defendants, Accetturo returned to Florida for his own safety. Accetturo later relocated to rural North Carolina, where he lived in a luxurious home and his family opened an Italian restaurant. In September 1989, New Jersey authorities extradited Accetturo from North Carolina, due to his refusal to appear and testify before a grand jury about labor racketeering and other state offenses. Due to Taccetta's murder contract, Accetturo was placed in protective custody. In 1993, Taccetta was sent to federal prison.

=== Amuso and Casso ===
Corallo and Accetturo had an "unbelievably great" relationship, and Corallo was undemanding when it came to money. As the years went by, Corallo had lowered his demands from the Jersey Crew. During the last years of the Corallo regime, Accetturo had been decreasing his tribute to the point that he was only giving the family $50,000 a year.

In late 1986, the entire Lucchese hierarchy—Corallo, underboss Salvatore "Tom Mix" Santoro, and consigliere Christopher "Christie Tick" Furnari—received 100-year sentences in the 1986 Commission case. Before the end of the trial, Corallo realized that he would not only be convicted, but that any sentence would be long enough to assure he would die in prison. He engineered a peaceful transition of power that saw Vittorio "Vic" Amuso become the new boss. Shortly afterward, one of Amuso's compatriots, Anthony "Gaspipe" Casso, became underboss.

The ascension of Amuso and Casso ended Accetturo's idyllic lifestyle. They demanded that Accetturo turn over 50 percent of the crew's proceeds to them. When Accetturo refused, the two bosses "pulled down" (demoted) Accetturo from capo to soldier. They additionally put out contracts on both Accetturo and his son, also a member of the Jersey Crew.

In the fall of 1988, the entire Jersey Crew was summoned to meet with Amuso in Brooklyn—ostensibly to be told of the new chain of command. However, fearing that this was a setup for a massacre, all of them refused to go and instead went into hiding soon afterwards. With the family's interests in New Jersey in shambles, an enraged Amuso issued the now-infamous "Whack Jersey" order, demanding that everyone in the faction be murdered.

Over the next twelve months, most of the Jersey Crew's members came back to the family. Amuso told the returned crew members that Accetturo was an outlaw who needed to be eliminated and sent hitmen to Florida, searching for Accetturo and his son, Anthony Jr. However, Amuso did not know that Accetturo was already jailed in New Jersey for refusing to testify in front a state panel.

Accetturo was indicted in a racketeering case developed by the New Jersey Attorney General's Office and New Jersey State Police in Ocean County, New Jersey. On August 13, 1993, Accetturo was convicted on racketeering charges. The investigation that ultimately brought him down was led by Robert Buccino, a childhood friend who was now a top organized-crime expert in the New Jersey Attorney General's office.

Accetturo faced a sentence of at least 30 years in prison—tantamount to a life sentence at his age. He also learned that Amuso and Casso had marked his wife, Geraldine Accetturo, for death. Blaming Amuso and Casso for the turmoil in the family, Accetturo decided to become a government informant in hopes of saving his life and gaining a lenient sentence.

As the highest-ranking New Jersey mobster at the time to turn informer, and a three-decade veteran of the Mafia, Accetturo provided investigators with a clear picture of the Lucchese family, including its penetration and exploitation of businesses in New Jersey, and its relationships with corrupt officials. Accetturo provided information on thirteen murders, although he insisted he never personally participated in the slayings. Accetturo provided unexpected information about the origins of the New Jersey family, going back to 1931 and Lucky Luciano. Mysteries about the relationship between the American and Sicilian Mafia were also clarified. As a result of his cooperation, Accetturo was sentenced to a maximum of 20 years in prison in December 1994; in December 2002, his sentence was reduced to time served and he retired to the South.

In an interview with The New York Times writer and Mafia historian Selwyn Raab, Accetturo said he would have never even considered turning informant had Corallo still been running the family. In those days, he recalled, the Mafia was run by men who never put money above honor, and only killed as a last resort. As he saw it, Amuso and Casso were the ones who betrayed Cosa Nostra principles. Accetturo was especially bitter about Casso, asserting that, “all he wanted to do is kill, kill, get what you can, even if you didn't earn it.”

== Popular culture ==
- The 2006 Sidney Lumet film Find Me Guilty chronicles the two-year trial of Accetturo and other family members. In the film, Accetturo is given the name Nick Calabrese. He was played by Alex Rocco.

| Preceded by Joseph Abate | Jersey Crew boss 1979–1988 | Succeeded by Michael Taccetta |
