= Carmine Tramunti =

American mobster and crime boss

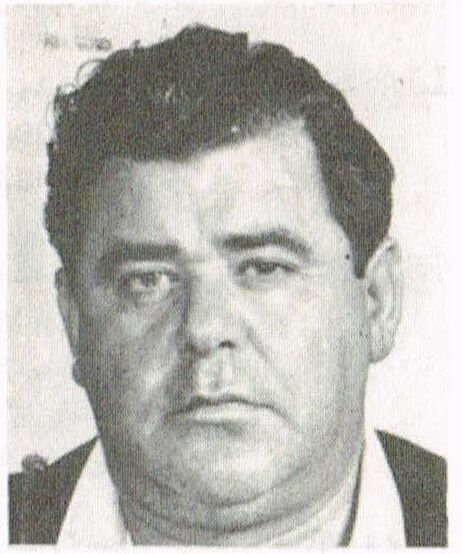
- 1960s mugshot of Carmine Tramunti
- Born: October 1, 1910; Naples, Kingdom of Italy
- Died: October 15, 1978 (aged 68); Ossining, New York, U.S.
- Resting place: Calvary Cemetery, Queens
- Other name: Mr. Gribbs
- Occupation: Mobster
- Predecessor: Tommy Lucchese
- Successor: Anthony Corallo
- Spouse: Lillian Anelli
- Children: 3
- Allegiance: Lucchese crime family
- Convictions: Felonious assault (1931); Criminal contempt (1973); Drug trafficking (1974)
- Penalty: Six to 15 years' imprisonment Three years' imprisonment 15 years' imprisonment

Carmine Paul "Mr. Gribbs" Tramunti (October 1, 1910 – October 15, 1978) was an Italian-born American mobster who was the boss of the Lucchese crime family.

== Biography ==
=== Operating in Harlem ===
Carmine Paul Tramunti was born October 1, 1910, in Naples, Italy to Rosa DeRosa and Luigi Tramunti. In 1913, his family immigrated to the United States and settled in Manhattan, New York City. Tramunti was raised in a tenement on 107th Street in Harlem.

In 1922, the 12-year-old Tramunti was sent to a Catholic reform school due to truancy from school.

On December 9, 1930, Tramunti was arrested on charges of robbing a rent collector. However, on December 26, a judge dismissed the charges due to lack of evidence.

In July 1931, Tramunti was convicted of felonious assault and was sentenced to six to fifteen years at the Sing Sing Correctional Facility in Ossining, New York. He was paroled in 1937, then returned to prison for a violation.

He eventually ran the "Harlem Game", one of the major floating craps games in New York. Tramunti's headquarters was Stage Deli in Manhattan. Tramunti lived in Whitestone, Queens and had a wife and two children. One of Tramunti's sons, Louis, died at age 14.

=== Boss of Lucchese family ===
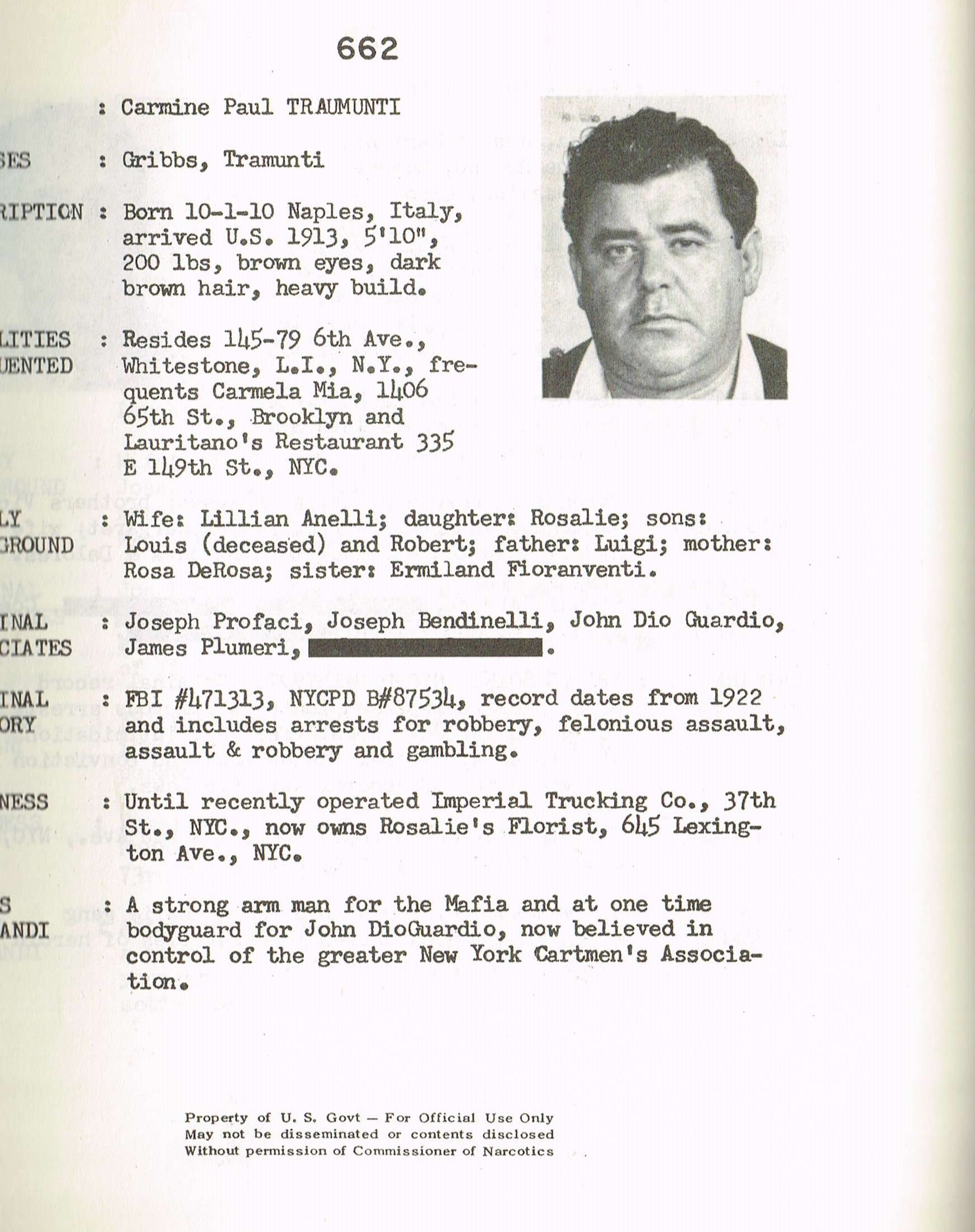
Bureau of Narcotics profile of Carmine Tramunti

In 1967, with the death of Lucchese boss Tommy Lucchese, Tramunti became the official boss of the Lucchese family. Carlo Gambino, the head of the Gambino crime family, allegedly used his influence to make Tramunti the Lucchese boss. Other sources said that Tramunti was a compromise candidate who was acceptable to the different family factions. A common version is that the Mafia Commission designated Tramunti as temporary boss until Lucchese's preferred successor, Anthony "Tony Ducks" Corallo, was released from prison

On November 19, 1970, Tramunti was indicted in Florida on 14 counts of stock fraud and other charges. The government charged that Tramunti and other mobsters forcibly seized control of a Miami investment firm. On December 23, 1971, Tramunti was acquitted of all charges in the stock swindle case. At the time, Tramunti identified himself as a florist.

On November 29, 1972, Tramunti was indicted on criminal contempt charges for lying to a grand jury about calls he made to capo Paul Vario. Tramunti was convicted and sentenced on August 6, 1973, to three years in state prison.

=== French Connection conviction ===
On October 4, 1973, as a result of "Operation Shamrock" (now known as the French Connection Case), Tramunti and 43 other mobsters were indicted on narcotics trafficking charges. Ultimately, Tramunti was convicted in the famous French Connection case for financing a huge heroin smuggling operation. A former steward at an espresso cafe testified to hearing drug dealer Louis Inglese discuss a deal with Tramunti and seeing Tramunti nod his head in approval. On May 7, 1974, Tramunti was sentenced to 15 years in federal prison, with the judge stating that he was "dangerous." Anthony "Tony Ducks" Corallo succeeded Tramunti as head of the Lucchese family. Tramunti would maintain for the rest of his life that "he had been framed. "I may be a mobster and may have done bad things," he insisted, "but I am not a drug dealer.""

=== Death ===
On October 15, 1978, Carmine Tramunti died of natural causes in prison. He is buried in Calvary Cemetery, Queens.

== In popular culture ==
- Tramunti's conviction in the French Connection case is referenced in the 1990 movie, Goodfellas. In the movie, Lucchese family caporegime Paul Cicero (based on the real life counterpart Paul Vario) warns the main character Henry Hill against drug dealing following Hill's release from prison in 1978; Cicero references "Gribbs" as an example of a mob boss who will die in prison "just for saying 'hello'" to an associate who was "sneaking behind his back selling junk". The film depicts Cicero experiencing a similar fate to Gribbs as a result of Hill's involvement with drug trafficking and subsequent co-operation as an informant and prosecution witness.
- Tramunti may have been the inspiration for the Mafia character Dominic Cattano, played by the Sicilian-American actor Armand Assante, in the 2007 motion picture American Gangster.

American Mafia
Preceded by Thomas Lucchese	Lucchese crime family Boss; 1967–1974	Succeeded by Anthony Corallo
