= Michael Taccetta =

American mobster (born 1947)

- Born: Michael Salvatore Taccetta; September 16, 1947 (age 79); Newark, New Jersey, U.S.
- Other name: Mad Dog
- Occupations: Caporegime of the Lucchese crime family Boss of the Jersey Crew
- Children: 4
- Relatives: Martin "Marty" Taccetta (brother)
- Status: Released by NJDOC, 2014
- Allegiance: Lucchese crime family
- Convictions: Murder, conspiracy to commit murder, extortion, racketeering, loansharking, drug trafficking (1993)
- Penalty: 25 years' imprisonment (1993)

Michael Salvatore Taccetta (born September 16, 1947), also known as "Mad Dog," is an American mobster and high-ranking member of the Lucchese crime family, who controlled the family's New Jersey faction in the 1980s.

== Personal life ==
Taccetta, also known as "Mike T," was born in the Vailsburg neighborhood of Newark, New Jersey on September 16, 1947. This was the same neighborhood as the Gambino crime family's capo Joseph Paterno, for whom Taccetta reportedly worked in his early teens. Taccetta is the son of Angelo Taccetta, a self-employed building materials supplier, who law enforcement agencies reputed was a "made man" in the Lucchese crime family. Taccetta stands at 5'7" and weighs close to 225 pounds with black hair and brown eyes.

Michael was first arrested for assault at the age of twelve and was sent to Boys Town, a Catholic youth facility. He lived in Florham Park, New Jersey before his incarceration. He told people that he was self-employed. Taccetta graduated from Saint Benedict's Preparatory School in Newark at nineteen years old and attended one semester at Johnson & Wales University School of Business in Providence, Rhode Island. Taccetta returned to New Jersey and enrolled in Essex County College School of Business for a Bachelor of Arts in Business Management, receiving grades of C and D. He later worked as a laborer with his father and younger brother at the family construction supply firm. Taccetta married his long-time girlfriend, Carol Ann Nozdrovicky, whom he had met at Newark Preparatory in his early twenties. They have 4 children, including Carlo Taccetta, who allegedly is a made member of the Lucchese crime family. The couple lived with Carol's parents in South Orange, New Jersey before moving into a three-family house.

=== Winning the New Jersey State Lottery ===
In 1983, Taccetta's wife, Carol Ann, won $611,979 from the New Jersey State Lottery. Carol was deemed the '100th Millionaire' by the State Lottery Commission, since it began holding the lottery in 1969. She described Michael to the media upon winning the lottery as an "oil company consultant." They were married for seventeen years and Michael fathered four children. As father and husband, he attended the Holy Family Parish with his family. Michael is the godfather to his brother Martin's children as Martin is to his. Michael was a heavyset man whose dark, sunken eyes always appeared to be tired.

=== Family mob ties ===
Michael Taccetta is the cousin of mobsters Michael Perna, and Daniel, Joseph and Thomas Ricciardi. He was especially close to his cousin Daniel, who was five years younger. The two cousins were described as being 'inseparable' during the 1960s. Robert Buccino, a New Jersey organized crime expert, said that Taccetta and Ricciardi ran with a gang that thought nothing of "beating up someone 10 to 1". His cousins Daniel and Thomas later became informants and turned state's evidence when facing jail for murder and drug trafficking.

Michael is the uncle of Joseph Perna born c.a. 1969, John Perna born c.a. 1977 and Ralph Perna Junior born c.a. 1972. They followed their father and uncle into organized crime. He is the uncle of Pamela Abdy, a film producer whose credits include "Garden State" that was awarded an Independent Spirit Award for Best First Feature in 2005 as well as three other movies including "Man on the Moon" in 1999.

Although recognized as an associate of the Gambinos, Taccetta was influenced by his older friend from childhood, Anthony "Tumac" Accetturo, who, at the age of 17, was already recruited by the rival Lucchese crime family, and joined Accetturo's street crew in their North Jersey faction. During the mid-1960s, both Michael and Martin Taccetta started with Accetturo in illegal gambling and loansharking on the orders of Gaetano "Tommy" Lucchese. On December 23, 1971, Taccetta was convicted of conspiracy to operate a lottery and numbers, for which he was sentenced to less than two years in prison, and fined $1,000. He was identified as a career criminal offender and an associate of other criminal offenders.

== Career ==
During the early 1970s, Accetturo, who currently worked as Taccetta's mentor, was indicted on illegal gambling charges in Newark, New Jersey, and decided to avoid prosecution by escaping to Florida. Taccetta was chosen by Accetturo to run day-to-day activities in Newark. In February 1973, Accetturo was indicted for loansharking and extortion. He was eventually arrested in Miami, Florida. Accetturo later returned to run his Newark operations with Taccetta in early 1975.

=== Lucchese Made Man ===
In 1976, the newly made boss of the Lucchese crime family, Anthony "Tony Ducks" Corallo decided to strengthen his New Jersey faction, inducting Accetturo, Taccetta and several others into the Lucchese crime family that year. Accetturo was put in charge of the North Jersey faction of the Luccheses, and Taccetta became his top protégé.

=== Expanding Jersey ===
During the late 1970s, Accetturo encountered several indictments, as the State of New Jersey tried to extradite Accetturo, but failed due to poor health. Accetturo later relocated his business interests to Miami and Hollywood, Florida, but remained the official chief of New Jersey. Taccetta was again chosen to run the Northern Jersey faction on Accetturo's behalf, and soon expanded Accetturo's operations, to include extortion, drug trafficking and money laundering, through his "legitimate" business "Taccetta Group Enterprises", where Taccetta's position was company president.

=== Philly operations ===
On March 21, 1980, the boss of the Philadelphia crime family Angelo "Gentle Don" Bruno was shot to death, in the aftermath of which the double dealing Funzi Tieri of the Genovese LCN had "The Commission" support the murder of all those involved in the Bruno murder (though they had been encouraged to do the same by Tieri). After this, Philip Testa found himself boss, but was killed by his underboss Pete Casella. Consigliere Nicodemo Scarfo, then fighting the remnants of the Casella faction to maintain control of the Philadelphia family. When Accetturo heard of this, he ordered Taccetta to establish a new crew of the Lucchese crime family, under Taccetta's control. Because of the bad relations between the two factions in Philadelphia's crime family, and Taccetta and Accetturo exploiting the situation, the relationship between Philadelphia and the Five Families worsened.

=== Excluded from New Jersey ===
On January 6, 1984, Taccetta was excluded from New Jersey casinos, stemming from his prior convictions in the 1970s. Despite his exclusion, Taccetta kept operating in North Jersey. His brother Martin then served as acting boss on behalf of Taccetta in the mid-1980s.

=== Longest Mafia trial in U.S. ===
In 1986, prosecutions which resulted in the Mafia Commission Trial were set up in New York, to try Anthony Corallo and the entire administration of the Lucchese crime family. Taccetta and Accetturo were also arrested that year, along with 18 other top mobsters of the Northern New Jersey faction. The indictment was the result of a four-year investigation. The charges were 76 counts of labor racketeering, illegal gambling, loansharking, extortion, drug trafficking, money laundering, and conspiracy. The longest Mafia trial ever in the United States, it went for more than 21 months. Stunningly, unlike the Mafia Commission Trial, in the case of Taccetta and Accetturo and their associates, all 20 defendants were acquitted on the Racketeer Influenced and Corrupt Organizations Act predicates, but as the trial was overdue, rivalry developed in the Jersey Crew.

=== Accetturo rivalry ===
During the trial, both Taccetta and Accetturo agreed that it wasn't the right time for a war. That changed in 1988, as Taccetta declared war on Accetturo, and the North Jersey crew split into two factions. One of the main reasons were that Accetturo had promoted his son, Anthony Accetturo, Jr. to reorganize the Jersey crew upon his retirement, which Taccetta had been eager to take over since the early 1980s. When the trial ended in acquittals, Accetturo returned to Florida for his own safety.

=== Whack North Jersey ===
After the conviction of Anthony Corallo in 1986, and the murder of his protégé Anthony "Buddy" Luongo, Brooklyn, New York faction leaders Vittorio "Vic" Amuso and Anthony "Gaspipe" Casso chose themselves as the new Lucchese bosses. Underboss Casso was allowed wide control by his friend Amuso and became paranoid, murdering several mobsters he feared were disloyal. Amuso hadn't been satisfied with their profit from the New Jersey faction in the late 1980s, as he demanded 50% of both Taccetta and Accetturo's take, which they both refused. Vic Amuso and Anthony Casso, a man of great fear and reportedly with dozens of murders on his hands, announced his order, "Whack Jersey". Summoned to a meeting in Brooklyn with Amuso, the entire North Jersey faction, who were fearful of being massacred, went into hiding. Over the next 12 months, most of the New Jersey crew members came back to the family. Victor Amuso told the returned crew members that Accetturo needed to go. Reportedly, Taccetta sent messages to Amuso in Brooklyn, asking for a contract on Accetturo's life. Amuso is reportedly to have agreed, as Taccetta was now under his wings.

=== Weakening New Jersey ===
With Accetturo out of the way, Michael and Martin Taccetta were reportedly the leaders of the New Jersey faction, as Taccetta started cooperating with the head of the Gambino crime family, John Gotti, through Gambino caporegime, Thomas "Tommy" Gambino. During the last years of the 1980s, Taccetta's faction was much weakened due to increased law enforcement and bad relations with Amuso. The new administration was Michael Taccetta as the boss of faction, Michael Perna as the underboss and Martin Taccetta as the official consigliere. Reportedly, around this time law enforcement started seeing the Jersey faction as an independent family.

=== Trial and imprisonment ===
In the early 1990s, the entire New Jersey faction's administration was put on trial, including the elder Accetturo, who had been imprisoned due to the contract both Taccetta and Amuso had put on his life in the late 1980s. The two began another war. Michael and Martin Taccetta were given 25 years for racketeering, narcotics, extortion, loansharking, conspiracy and murder in 1993. Taccetta reportedly went on to control the Jersey Crew, while he was serving his sentence in Atlanta.

== South Woods State Prison ==
During his years as leader, Taccetta fought several internal wars, both with Accetturo and later Thomas Ricciardi, who turned state's evidence to convict Taccetta. His brother Martin Taccetta, though sentenced to life, was let out of prison in 2005 after granted his appeal that he was framed in his murder trial. Martin has since had his release overturned and is serving a life sentence at New Jersey State Prison.

As of April 2012, Michael Taccetta was imprisoned in New Jersey's South Woods State Prison in Bridgeton, New Jersey. He was first eligible for parole on August 13, 2013.

On March 19, 2014, Taccetta was released from prison.

Business positions
Preceded by Anthony Accetturo	Jersey Crew Boss; 1980-2005	Succeeded by Martin Taccetta
