= Anthony Corallo =

American mobster (1913–2000)

- Born: Antonio Corallo; February 12, 1913; East Harlem, New York City, U.S.
- Died: August 23, 2000 (aged 87); United States Medical Center for Federal Prisoners, Springfield, Missouri, U.S.
- Other name: "Tony Ducks"
- Occupation: Crime boss
- Predecessor: Carmine Tramunti
- Successor: Vic Amuso
- Allegiance: Lucchese crime family
- Conviction: Racketeering (1986)
- Penalty: 100 years' imprisonment and fined $240,000 (1987)

Anthony "Tony Ducks" Corallo (born Antonio Corallo, Italian: [anˈtɔːnjo koˈral.lo]; February 12, 1913 – August 23, 2000) was an American mobster and boss of the Lucchese crime family in New York City. Corallo exercised tremendous control over trucking and construction unions in New York.

== Biography ==
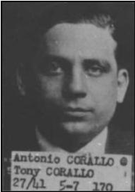
FBI mugshot of Anthony Corallo

Corallo was born in New York City on February 12, 1913, and grew up in the Italian neighborhood of East Harlem.

Corallo was a quiet, unassuming man who enjoyed gardening, opera, and pasta. In his later years, Corallo owned a luxurious home in Oyster Bay Cove, New York. Corallo was married and had a son and a daughter.

== Criminal career ==
=== East Harlem gang ===
In 1929, at the age of 16, Corallo dropped out of high school and joined the 107th Street Gang in East Harlem. His first arrest came in July 1929, for grand larceny, but he was not convicted.

By 1935, Corallo had become a member of the Gagliano crime family, the forerunner of the Lucchese family. Underboss Tommy Lucchese recruited Corallo to work with mobster Johnny Dio, the leader of labor racketeering operations in the Manhattan Garment District.

In 1941, Corallo was arrested after police found him in possession of a narcotics cache valued at $150,000. He was later convicted of narcotics violations and sent to the city jail on Rikers Island for six months.

=== Rise to power ===
In 1943, when Corallo was just 30 years old, he was appointed as a caporegime of his own crew. He then moved his base of operations from East Harlem to Queens. Corallo and Dio eventually controlled five local chapters of the International Brotherhood of Teamsters. The two gangsters used these paper locals to set up favorable deals with trucking companies and exploit the rank and file chapter members. Corallo and Dio also controlled local chapters of the Conduit Workers Union (now called the Communication Workers' Union), the United Textile Workers Union (now called UNITE HERE), and the Brotherhood of Painters and Decorators (now called the International Union of Painters and Allied Trades). These labor racketeering activities generated millions of dollars for the Gagliano family.

From 1941 to 1960, Corallo was arrested at least 12 times for various crimes. However, none of the cases even made it to trial. Lucchese was amazed at Corallo's ability to avoid, or "duck", convictions. After one of these many dismissals, Lucchese mused, "Tony ducks again." From then onward, Corallo was known as "Tony Ducks".

In 1951, longtime boss Tommy Gagliano died of natural causes and Lucchese took over the family.

On August 15, 1959, Corallo testified before the U.S. Senate Select Committee on Improper Activities in Labor and Management. The senators wanted Corallo to explain the theft of $70,000 from Teamsters Union local 239 by using names of dead mob members. Like many other mobsters, Corallo refused to answer any questions; he pleaded the Fifth Amendment 120 times during his two-hour interrogation.

On December 7, 1961, Corallo was indicted on charges of trying to bribe New York Supreme Court Justice J. Vincent Keogh and former U.S. Attorney Elliot Kanaher. Corallo wanted them to drop a bankruptcy fraud case against one of his associates. On January 23, 1961, New York Police subpoenaed Corallo after finding out he was hiding in a Long Island home that was rented by his associate Felice Falco.

On June 17, 1962, Corallo was convicted of bribery. On August 2, 1962, Corallo was sentenced to two years in state prison.

=== Family boss ===
On July 13, 1967, Lucchese died of a brain tumor. By nearly all accounts, Corallo was Lucchese's choice to succeed him.

However, on December 18, 1967, Corallo was indicted on charges of receiving a kickback payment from a contractor for the renovation of the Jerome Park Reservoir in the Bronx. Also indicted was James L. Marcus, the former city water commissioner, who had started dealing with Corallo due to loanshark debts. On June 19, 1968, Corallo was convicted in the Marcus bribery case. On July 26, 1968, Corallo was sentenced to three years in federal prison.

With Corallo in prison, the Commission designated Carmine Tramunti as interim Lucchese boss. Some historians have speculated that Corallo became boss immediately upon his 1970 release from prison, and that Tramunti was only an "acting" or "front" boss for the next three years. On May 7, 1973, Tramunti was sentenced to 15 years in federal prison. Corallo then became the indisputable boss of the Lucchese family.

One of Corallo's first moves as boss was to take over gravel distribution in various areas of New York such as Long Island. In owning major gravel companies in his territories or areas of influence, Corallo increased the Lucchese crime family's influence in the construction industry and with the unions involved. The garbage industry would be next on his list. With the help of a union official named Bernie Adelstein, the front business would be called Private Sanitation Industry Association. Next, with the help of Lucchese capo Paul Vario and his crew, Corallo would gain power at John F. Kennedy International Airport.

=== Mafia Commission Trial ===
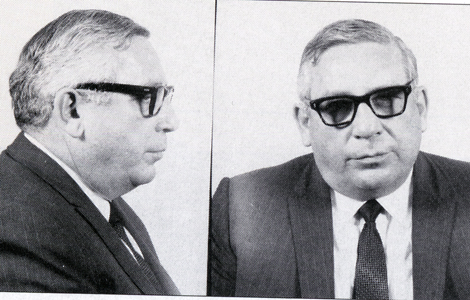
An FBI mugshot of Anthony Corallo

In the early 1980s, Corallo unwittingly provided the government with evidence that would all but end his career. Over the years, Corallo and Salvatore Avellino established a stranglehold on the waste hauling business on Long Island. To gather evidence against Avellino, members of the New York State Organized Crime Task Force (OCTF) used undercover informant Robert Kubecka, the owner of a Suffolk County garbage hauling business. Since the 1970s, Kubecka had refused to participate with mob control of the waste hauling business and had suffered extensive harassment as a result. In 1982, Kubecka agreed to wear a surveillance device during meetings with the mobsters. Although Kubecka was unable to get close to Avellino himself, the information Kubecka gathered eventually persuaded a judge to allow a wiretap on Avellino's home phone in Nissequogue, New York. The home phone tap was also disappointing to the agents; however, it did reveal that Avellino was driving Corallo around all day in Avellino's car.

In 1983, members of the OCTF installed an electronic surveillance device inside the dashboard on Avellino's Jaguar automobile while he and his wife were at a dinner dance. Agents then listened to many conversations between Corallo, Avellino, and other mobsters as they drove around the city. From these recorded conversations, OCTF learned the commission's internal structure, history, and relations with other crime families. These conversations were shared with federal prosecutors and provided them with invaluable evidence against Corallo and other family bosses in the Mafia Commission Trial.

Corallo, Avellino and Salvatore "Tom Mix" Santoro were among 21 people indicted by a Suffolk County grand jury on September 13, 1984 on charges relating to coercion and bid-rigging in the private garbage collection industry on Long Island, following a two-year investigation by the Attorney General, the OCTF, the Suffolk County District Attorney, the Suffolk County Police Department and the New York State Police.

On February 25, 1985, Corallo and other mob leaders were indicted in the Mafia Commission Trial. However, Corallo was in the hospital and was not arrested until after his release a few days later. Among the defendants were underboss Santoro and consigliere Christopher "Christie Tick" Furnari.

Awaiting trial, a meeting was held at Furnari's home, where Corallo told Furnari that he wanted the capo of Furnari's old crew, Vittorio "Vic" Amuso, or Furnari's aide-de-camp, Anthony "Gaspipe" Casso, as his successor. By this time, Corallo realized he would not only be convicted, but would almost certainly die in prison. Furnari, Amuso and Casso met in a separate room, and ultimately it was decided Amuso would take the mantle. Though Corallo reportedly preferred Casso, he agreed to make Amuso acting boss later that year, and it was understood he would formally become boss when Corallo, Santoro, and Furnari were expected to be convicted and sent to prison.

On November 19, 1986, Corallo and the other defendants were convicted of all racketeering charges. On January 13, 1987, Corallo was sentenced to 100 years in prison and fined $240,000.

=== Death ===
On August 23, 2000, Anthony Corallo died of natural causes at the Federal Medical Center for prisoners in Springfield, Missouri.

American Mafia
Preceded by Carmine Tramunti	Lucchese crime family Boss; 1974–87	Succeeded by Victor Amuso
