= Crime in New York City =

New York City
- Crime rates* (2024)

Violent crimes
- Homicide: 4.3
- Rape: 31.1
- Robbery: 199.3
- Aggravated assault: 465.2
- Total violent crime: 699.9

Property crimes
- Burglary: 159.5
- Larceny-theft: 1912.5
- Motor vehicle theft: 200.1
- Total property crime: 2272.1
- Note: Reported crimes per 100,000 population Source: New York State Index Crime

Crime rates in New York City have been recorded since at least the 1800s. The highest crime totals were recorded in the late 1980s and early 1990s as the crack epidemic surged, and then declined continuously from around 1990 throughout the present day. As of 2023, New York City has significantly lower rates of gun violence than many other large cities. Its 2023 homicide rate of 4.1 per 100,000 residents compares favorably to the rate in the United States as a whole (5.6 per 100,000), and rates in much more violent cities such as St. Louis (53.9 per 100,000 residents), and New Orleans (51.3 per 100,000).

During the 1990s, the New York City Police Department (NYPD) adopted CompStat, broken windows policing, and other strategies in a major effort to reduce crime. The drop in crime has been variously attributed to a number of factors, including these changes to policing, the end of the crack epidemic, the increased incarceration rate nationwide, gentrification, an aging population, and the decline of lead poisoning in children.

== History ==
=== 19th century ===
Organized crime has long been associated with New York City, beginning with the Forty Thieves and the Roach Guards gangs in the Five Points area of Manhattan in the 1820s.

In 1835, the New York Herald was established by James Gordon Bennett, Sr., who helped revolutionize journalism by covering stories that appeal to the masses including crime reporting. When Helen Jewett was murdered on April 10, 1836, Bennett did innovative on-the-scene investigation and reporting and helped bring the story to national attention.

Peter Cooper, at the request of the Common Council, drew up a proposal to create a police force of 1,200 officers. The state legislature approved the proposal on May 7, 1844, and abolished the nightwatch system. Under Mayor William Havemeyer, the police force reorganized and officially established itself on May 13, 1845, as the New York Police Department (NYPD). The new system divided the city into three districts and set up courts, magistrates, clerks, and station houses.

==== High-profile murders ====
===== Murder of Helen Jewett =====
Helen Jewett was an upscale New York City prostitute whose 1836 murder, along with the subsequent trial and acquittal of her alleged killer, Richard P. Robinson, generated an unprecedented amount of media coverage.

===== Murder of Mary Rogers =====
The murder of Mary Rogers in 1841 was heavily covered by the press, which also put the spotlight on the ineptitude and corruption in the city's watchmen system of law enforcement. At the time, New York City's population of 320,000 was served by an archaic force, consisting of one night watch, one hundred city marshals, thirty-one constables, and fifty-one police officers.

==== Riots ====
===== 1863 draft riots =====
The New York City draft riots in July 1863 were violent disturbances in New York City that were the culmination of working-class discontention with new laws passed by the U. S. Congress during that year to draft men to fight in the ongoing American Civil War. The riots remain the largest civil insurrection in American history (with 119 to 120 fatalities) aside from the Civil War itself.

President Abraham Lincoln was forced to divert several regiments of militia and volunteer troops from following up after the Battle of Gettysburg to control the city. The rioters were overwhelmingly working-class men, primarily ethnic Irish, resenting particularly that wealthier men, who could afford to pay a $300 ($5,555 in 2014 dollars) commutation fee to hire a substitute, were spared from the draft.

Initially intended to express anger at the draft, the protests turned into a race riot, with white rioters, mainly but not exclusively Irish immigrants, attacking blacks wherever they could be found. At least 11 blacks are estimated to have been killed. The conditions in the city were such that Major General John E. Wool, commander of the Department of the East, stated on July 16 that, "Martial law ought to be proclaimed, but I have not a sufficient force to enforce it." The military did not reach the city until after the first day of rioting, when mobs had already ransacked or destroyed numerous public buildings, two Protestant churches, the homes of various abolitionists or sympathizers, many black homes, and the Colored Orphan Asylum at 44th Street and Fifth Avenue, which was burned to the ground.

===== Other riots =====
In 1870, the Orange Riots were incited by Irish Protestants celebrating the Battle of the Boyne with parades through predominantly Irish Catholic neighborhoods. In the resulting police action, 63 citizens, mostly Irish, were killed.

The Tompkins Square Riot occurred on January 13, 1874, when police violently suppressed a demonstration involving thousands of people in Tompkins Square Park.

=== 20th century ===
High-profile crimes include:

==== 1900s–1950s ====
- April 14, 1903 – The dismembered and mutilated body of Benedetto Madonia, who had last been seen the day before eating with several high-ranking figures in the Morello crime family, the city's first dominant Mafia organization, is found in an East Village barrel, the most notorious of that era's Barrel Murders. After the NYPD arrested several members of the family tied to a local counterfeiting ring. Inspector George W. McClusky, hoping to compel their cooperation through public humiliation, had officers walk them through the streets of Little Italy in handcuffs to police headquarters, a forerunner of the perp walk that has since become a common practice in the city. It backfired, as the men were hailed as heroes by the Italian immigrant community they were paraded past. Charges against all defendants were later dropped for lack of evidence, and the killing remains unsolved.
- June 25, 1906 – Stanford White is shot and killed by Harry Kendall Thaw at what was then Madison Square Garden. The murder would soon be dubbed "The Crime of the Century".
- June 19, 1909 – The strangled body of Elsie Sigel, granddaughter of Civil War Union general Franz Sigel, 19, is found in a trunk in the Chinatown apartment of Leon Ling, a waiter at a Chinese restaurant, ten days after she was last seen leaving her parents' apartment to visit her grandmother. Evidence found in the apartment established that Ling and Sigel had been romantically involved, and he was suspected of the killing but never arrested. No other suspects have ever been identified.
- August 9, 1910 – Reformist Mayor William Jay Gaynor is shot in the throat in Hoboken, New Jersey by former city employee James Gallagher. He eventually dies in September 1913 from a heart attack.
- July 4, 1914 – Lexington Avenue explosion: Four are killed and dozens injured when dynamite, believed to have been accumulated by anarchists for an attempt to blow up John D. Rockefeller's Tarrytown Kykuit mansion, goes off prematurely in a seven-story apartment building at 1626 Lexington Avenue.
- June 11, 1920 – Joseph Bowne Elwell, a prominent auction bridge player, and writer, was shot in the head early in the morning in his locked Manhattan home. Despite intense media interest, the crime was never solved (one confession to police was dismissed because the man who made it was of dubious sanity). The case inspired the development of the locked-room murder sub-genre of detective fiction when Ellery Queen realized that the intense public fascination with the case indicated that there was a market for fictional takes on the story.
- September 16, 1920 – The Wall Street bombing kills 38 at "the precise center, geographical as well as metaphorical, of financial America and even of the financial world." Anarchists were suspected (Sacco and Vanzetti had been indicted just days before) but no one was ever charged with the crime.
- November 6, 1928 – Jewish gangster Arnold Rothstein, 46, an avid gambler best remembered for his alleged role fixing the 1919 World Series, died of gunshot wounds inflicted the day before during a Manhattan business meeting. He refused to identify his killer to police. A fellow gambler who was believed to have ordered the hit as retaliation for Rothstein's failure to pay a large debt from a recent poker game (Rothstein, in turn, claimed it had been fixed) was tried and acquitted. No other suspects have ever emerged.
- August 6, 1930 – The disappearance of Joseph Force Crater, an Associate Justice of the New York Supreme Court. He was last seen entering a New York City taxicab. Crater was declared legally dead in 1939.
- December 24, 1933 – Leon Tourian, 53, primate of the Eastern Diocese of the Armenian Apostolic Church in America, is stabbed to death by several armed men while performing Christmas Eve services. All were arrested and convicted the following summer. The killing was motivated by political divisions within the church; the ensuing schism persists.
- March 19, 1935 – The arrest of a shoplifter inflames racial tensions in Harlem and escalates to rioting and looting, with three killed, 125 injured and 100 arrested.
- March 28, 1937 – Veronica Gedeon, 20, a model known for posing in lurid illustrations for pulp magazines, is brutally murdered along with her mother, Mary Gedeon and a boarder, Frank Byrnes in her mother's Long Island City home. Sculptor Robert George Irwin, who left a telltale soap sculpture at the scene, was eventually arrested after a nationwide manhunt fed by widespread media coverage of the case, said to be the most intense since the Stanford White murder, which capitalized by Gedeon's risque professional work. After doubts about his sanity surfaced during trial, he was sentenced to life in prison.
- July 4, 1940 – Two police detectives are killed, and other officers injured, when a bomb detonated as they were carrying it out of the World's Fair from the British Pavilion. No arrests were made and the case remains open; investigators today believe it may have been planted by British intelligence as a false flag operation to implicate the German-American Bund and draw the U.S. into World War II, which was not going well for Britain at the time.
- November 16, 1940 – "Mad Bomber" George Metesky plants the first bomb of his 16-year campaign of public bombings.
- January 11, 1943 – Carlo Tresca, an Italian American labor leader who led the opposition to Fascism, Stalinism and Mafia control of unions, was shot dead at a Manhattan intersection during the night. Given the enemies he had made and their propensity for violence, the list of potential suspects was long; however, the investigation was incomplete and no one was ever officially named. Historians believe the most likely suspect was mobster Carmine Galante, later acting boss of the Bonanno family, seen fleeing the scene, who had likely acted on the orders of a Bonanno underboss and Fascist sympathizer Tresca had threatened to expose.
- August 1, 1943 – A race riot erupts in Harlem after a black soldier is shot by the police and rumored to be dead. The incident touches off a simmering brew of racial tension, unemployment, and high prices to a day of rioting and looting. Several looters are shot dead, about 500 people are injured, and another 500 arrested.
- March 8, 1952 – A month after helping police find bank robber Willie Sutton, 24-year-old clothing salesman Arnold Schuster is fatally shot outside his Brooklyn home. An extensive investigation failed to identify any suspects, though police came to believe that either the Gambino crime family or Sutton's associates had ordered Schuster killed. Schuster's family filed a lawsuit against the city, which led to a landmark ruling by the New York Court of Appeals that the government has a duty to protect anyone who cooperates with the police when asked to do so.
- October 25, 1957 — Mafia boss Albert Anastasia was shot dead while getting a shave at a Manhattan barbershop. As with many organized-crime killings, it remains officially unsolved.
- August 29, 1959 — Salvador Agron, 16, Puerto Rican gang member who murdered Anthony Krzesinski and Robert Young, Jr., two teenagers. He mistook them for members of a gang called the Norsemen who were supposed to show up for a gang fight. Agron was the subject of the musical The Capeman by Paul Simon.

==== 1960s ====
- January 27, 1962 — The French Connection drug bust nets 112 pounds (51 kg) of heroin hidden inside a car shipped from France, with an estimated street value of $112 million, the biggest drug haul in U.S. history at that point. The work of detectives Eddie Egan and Sonny Grosso leading up to it was later the subject of The French Connection by Robin Moore, which formed the basis for the influential, Oscar-winning 1971 film of the same name.
- May 18, 1962 – Two NYPD detectives were killed in a gun battle with robbers at the Boro Park Tobacco store in Brooklyn, the first time two NYPD detectives died in the same incident since the 1920s. The resulting manhunt brings in the perpetrators, including Jerry Rosenberg, who after being spared the death penalty would become one of America's best-known jailhouse lawyers. The case also led to controversy over the perp walk, in which freshly arrested suspects are paraded in front of the media: Rosenberg filed a federal lawsuit over prejudicial remarks made by a detective during his, and another detective, Albert Seedman, was briefly demoted in response to outrage over a picture of him holding up the head of the other suspect, Tony Dellernia, for photographers who missed the perp walk.
- August 28, 1963 – The Career Girls Murders: Emily Hoffert and Janet Wylie, two young professionals, are murdered in their Upper East Side apartment by an intruder. Richard Robles, a young white man, was ultimately apprehended in 1965 after investigators erroneously arrested and forced a false confession from a black man, George Whitmore, who was innocent of the crime. Whitmore was compelled to wrongfully spend many years incarcerated, but he was eventually released after his innocence was established, while Robles remains in prison as of 2013.
- March 13, 1964 – Kitty Genovese is stabbed 12 times in Kew Gardens, Queens by Winston Moseley. The crime is witnessed by numerous people, none of whom aid Genovese or call for help. The crime is noted by psychology textbooks in later years for its demonstration of the bystander effect. Moseley died in prison in 2016.
- July 18, 1964 – Riots break out in Harlem in protest over the killing of a 15-year-old by a white NYPD officer. One person is killed and 100 are injured in the violence.
- February 21, 1965 – Black nationalist leader Malcolm X is assassinated at the Audubon Ballroom by three members of the Nation of Islam.
- July 14, 1965 – Two children, five-year-old Eddie and four-year-old Alice "Missy", went missing. Later that day, Missy was found strangled and five days after that, Eddie was also found dead. The mother Alice Crimmins was charged for the murders.
- April 7, 1967: Members of the Lucchese crime family, including Henry Hill and Tommy DeSimone, walked into the Air France cargo terminal at JFK airport around midnight and walked out with $420,000 in cash that had been exchanged overseas. The theft, which remained undiscovered for two days, was at the time the highest-valued cargo theft at the airport; it has since been exceeded by the 1978 Lufthansa heist perpetrated by some of the same criminals, including Hill. Both are dramatized in the 1990 Martin Scorsese film GoodFellas, based on Hill's memoirs.
- October 8, 1967 – James "Groovy" Hutchinson, 21, an East Village hippie/stoner, and Linda Fitzpatrick, 18, a newly converted flower child from a wealthy Greenwich, Connecticut family, are found bludgeoned to death at 169 Avenue B, an incident dubbed "The Groovy Murders" by the press. Two drifters later plead guilty to the murders.
- July 3, 1968 – A Bulgarian immigrant and Neo-Nazi, 42-year-old Angel Angelof, opens fire from a lavatory roof in Central Park, killing Lilah Kistler, a 24-year-old woman and a Joseph Bach, an 80-year-old man before being gunned down by police.
- June 13, 1969 – Clarence 13X, founder of the Nation of Islam splinter group Five-Percent Nation, was shot and killed in the early morning hours in the lobby of his girlfriend's Harlem apartment building. The crime remains unsolved.
- June 28, 1969 – A questionable police raid on the Stonewall Inn, a Greenwich Village gay bar, is resisted by the patrons and leads to the Stonewall riots. The event helps inspire the founding of the modern homosexual rights movement.

==== 1970s ====
- March 6, 1970 – Greenwich Village townhouse explosion: Three members of the domestic terrorist group the Weathermen are killed when a nail bomb they were building accidentally explodes in the basement of a townhouse on 18 West 11th Street.
- May 21, 1971 – Two NYPD officers, Waverly Jones and Joseph Piagentini, are gunned down in ambush by members of the Black Liberation Army in Harlem. The gunmen, Herman Bell (now Jalil Muntaqim) and Anthony Bottom were arrested and imprisoned. Bell was released on parole in 2018. As of 2019 Muntaqim remained imprisoned. In 2007 the two men were also charged in connection with the 1971 killing of a San Francisco police officer.
- April 7, 1972 – Mobster Joe Gallo is gunned down at Umberto's Clam House in Little Italy. The incident serves as the inspiration for the Bob Dylan's epic "Joey" recorded in 1975.
- April 14, 1972 – The 1972 Harlem mosque incident: Two NYPD officers responded to an apparent call for assistance from a detective at a Harlem address that turned out to be a mosque used by the Nation of Islam. What happened when they got there is still unclear, but both officers were seriously beaten, and one, Philip Cardillo, was shot. He died of the wounds six days later. Louis 17X Dupree, director of the mosque's school, was eventually tried for Cardillo's murder. After the first jury deadlocked, he was acquitted at a second trial.
- August 22, 1972 – John Wojtowicz and Salvatore Natuarale hold up a Brooklyn bank for 14 hours, in a bid to allegedly get cash to pay for the sex-change operation of Elizabeth Eden, Wojtowicz's wife, although it may have been an effort to repay Wojtowicz's gambling debts. The scheme fails when the cops arrive, leading to a tense 14-hour standoff. Natuarale is killed by the police at JFK Airport. The incident served as the basis for the 1975 film Dog Day Afternoon.
- December 1972 — The police department discloses that around 200 pounds (91 kg) of heroin, much of it seized in the French Connection busts a decade earlier, has been stolen from evidence lockers over a period of several months and replaced with cornstarch by someone who signed in under false names and nonexistent badge numbers. Several detectives were suspected of complicity in the thefts; in 2009 Brooklyn mobster Anthony Casso, serving 455 years in federal prison, intimated that he knew who had stolen the drugs.
- January 3, 1973 – The body of 29-year-old teacher Roseann Quinn is discovered, with multiple stab wounds, in her Upper West Side apartment after she failed to show up for the first day of classes in the new year. John Wayne Wilson, a man she had picked up at nearby bar on New Year's Eve, was later arrested and charged with the murder but killed himself in jail before he could be tried. The incident inspired the 1975 novel Looking for Mr. Goodbar, the source for the 1977 film of the same name starring Diane Keaton.
- April 28, 1973 — Clifford Glover, a 10-year-old black resident of Jamaica, Queens, was shot and killed by police officer Thomas Shea while running from an unmarked car, which he thought was a robbery attempt. Shea was charged with murder, the first time an NYPD officer had been so charged for a killing in the line of duty in 50 years. He claimed that he saw a gun, a claim contradicted by ballistic evidence that showed Glover had been shot from behind. Race riots broke out following his acquittal the following year. It inspired the opening verse of The Rolling Stones's song "Doo Doo Doo Doo Doo (Heartbreaker)" .
- January 24, 1975 – Fraunces Tavern, a historical site in lower Manhattan, is bombed by the FALN, killing four people and wounding more than 50.
- December 29, 1975 – The 1975 LaGuardia Airport bombing: A bomb explodes in the baggage claim area of the TWA terminal at LaGuardia Airport, killing 11 and injuring 74. The perpetrators were never identified.
- July 29, 1976 – David Berkowitz (aka the "Son of Sam") kills one person and seriously wounds another in the first of a series of attacks that terrorized the city for the next year.
- November 25, 1976 – NYPD officer Robert Torsney fatally shoots unarmed 15-year-old Randolph Evans in Cypress Hills, Brooklyn. Torsney is found not guilty by reason of insanity the following year and is released from Queens' Creedmoor Psychiatric Center in 1979, only to be denied a disability pension.
- July 13, 1977 – Dominick Ciscone, a 17-year-old aspiring mobster, is shot and killed while hanging out with friends on Smith Street in the Carroll Gardens neighborhood of Brooklyn, the only homicide to occur during that year's blackout. Police investigate several local parties Ciscone was known to have had disputes with but do not identify any suspects. Despite several promising anonymous tips to police around the killing's 20th anniversary in 1997, it remained unsolved as of 2019.
- September 14, 1977 – Variety reporter Addison Verrill, 36, was found beaten and stabbed in his Greenwich Village apartment after having spent the night in gay bars. After the killer called Village Voice reporter Arthur Bell, an acquaintance of Verrill's, and confessed, he was identified as Paul Bateson, a former radiological technician at New York University Medical Center who had appeared in that role in The Exorcist. Bateson was convicted of the murder and served 25 years in prison; police suspected him in a series of serial killings of still-unidentified gay men whose dismembered bodies were found in bags in the Hudson (inspiring a plot element in the 1980 film Cruising) but no charges were ever filed.
- October 12, 1978 – Sid Vicious, former bassist of seminal English punk band the Sex Pistols, allegedly stabs his girlfriend Nancy Spungen to death in their room in the Hotel Chelsea. He died of a drug overdose before he could be tried.
- December 11, 1978 – Lufthansa heist: At the German airline's JFK Airport cargo terminal, an armed gang makes off with $5 million in cash and $875,000 in jewelry in the early hours of the morning. The well-planned robbery was at the time the largest cash theft ever in the United States and remains the largest theft ever at the airport. It was masterminded by members of the Lucchese crime family, including Henry Hill and Tommy DeSimone, who had pulled off the Air France robbery at the airport nine years earlier. Tensions among the gang over how to divide the money, and some members' failure to keep a low profile in the wake of the crime led to the deaths or disappearances of 10 of those involved over the next few months. Many of the killings are believed to have been committed or ordered by Lucchese associate Jimmy Burke, though no one was ever arrested and charged (not least because many died first). The crime and its aftermath have been dramatized in the films The 10 Million Dollar Robbery, The Big Heist—and GoodFellas, Martin Scorsese's 1990 adaptation of Hill's memoirs. In 2014 Vincent Asaro, a 78-year-old Bonanno family capo was indicted on charges of receiving money from the robbery and conspiring in it. He was acquitted the following year, the only person ever tried in connection with the crime.
- May 25, 1979 – Six-year-old Etan Patz vanishes after leaving his SoHo apartment to walk to his school bus alone. Despite a massive search by the NYPD the boy is never found and was declared legally dead in 2001.

==== 1980s ====
- March 14, 1980 – Ex-Congressman Allard Lowenstein is assassinated in his law offices at Rockefeller Center by Dennis Sweeney, a deranged ex-associate.
- December 8, 1980 – Ex-Beatle John Lennon is murdered in front of his home in The Dakota.
- November 5, 1982 – Author and artist Theresa Hak Kyung Cha was raped and killed by security guard and serial rapist Joey Sanza in The Puck Building.
- September 15, 1983 – Michael Stewart is allegedly beaten into a coma by New York Transit Police officers. Stewart died 13 days later from his injuries at Bellevue Hospital. On November 24, 1985, after a six-month trial, six officers were acquitted on charges stemming from Stewart's death.
- April 15, 1984 – Christopher Thomas, 34, murders two women and 8 children at 1080 Liberty Avenue in the East New York section of Brooklyn.
- September 21, 1984 – Darryl Jeter shoots and kills police officer Irma Lozada at Wilson Avenue station in Bushwick, Brooklyn. Jeter was sentenced to serve 32.5 years to life in prison and was released on parole on December 7, 2021. Lozada became the first female police officer to die while at work in New York City.
- October 29, 1984 – Police shoot and kill 66-year-old Eleanor Bumpurs as they try to evict her from her Bronx apartment. Bumpurs, who was mentally ill, was wielding a knife and had slashed one of the officers. The shooting provoked heated debate about police racism and brutality. In 1987 officer Stephen Sullivan was acquitted on charges of manslaughter and criminally negligent homicide stemming from the shooting.
- December 2, 1984 – Caroline Rose Isenberg, a 23-year-old aspiring actress, was stabbed to death in the early morning hours after returning to her Upper West Side apartment from a Broadway show. Emmanuel Torres, the building custodian's son, was arrested at the end of the month and charged with the crime. He was convicted the following year and sentenced to life in prison. The case received considerable national media attention.
- December 22, 1984 – Bernhard Goetz shoots and seriously wounds four unarmed black men on a 2 train on the subway who he claimed were trying to rob him, generating weeks of headlines and many discussions about crime and vigilantism in the media.
- June 12, 1985 – Edmund Perry, a returning graduate of Phillips Exeter Academy in Exeter, New Hampshire, is shot to death in Harlem by undercover officer Lee Van Houten, who claimed that Perry and his brother, Jonah, attacked and attempted to rob him. A grand jury declined to indict Van Houten the following month.
- December 16, 1985 – Gambino crime family boss Paul Castellano is shot dead in a gangland execution on East 46th Street in Manhattan.
- August 26, 1986 – 18-year-old student Jennifer Levin is murdered by Robert Chambers in Central Park after the two had left a bar to have sex in the park. The case was sensationalized in the press and raised issues over victims' rights, as Chambers' attorney attempted to smear Levin's reputation to win his client's freedom.
- October 4, 1986 – CBS News anchorman Dan Rather is assaulted while walking along Park Avenue by two men, one of whom Rather reported kept asking him "Kenneth, what is the frequency?" as he did. The mysterious question became a pop-culture catch-phrase, and inspired an R.E.M. song that Rather joined with the band in performing on Late Night with David Letterman. William Tager, who apparently believed that Rather was secretly broadcasting messages to him, was identified as one of the assailants in 1997 (though not charged because the statute of limitations had expired) following his own conviction for killing an NBC stagehand.
- November 19, 1986 – 20-year-old Larry Davis opens fire on NYPD officers attempting to arrest him in his sister's apartment in the Bronx. Six officers are wounded, and Davis eludes capture for the next 17 days, during which time he became something of a folk hero in the neighborhood. Davis was stabbed to death in jail in 2008.
- December 20, 1986 – A white mob in Howard Beach, Queens, attacks three black men whose car had broken down in the largely white neighborhood. One of the men, Michael Griffith is chased onto Shore Parkway where he is hit and killed by a passing car. The killing prompted several tempestuous marches through the neighborhood led by Al Sharpton.
- July 9, 1987 – 12-year-old Jennifer Schweiger, a girl with Down syndrome, is abducted and murdered in Staten Island by a sex offender and suspected mass murderer, Andre Rand.
- November 2, 1987 – Joel Steinberg and his lover Hedda Nussbaum are arrested for the beating and neglect of their six-year-old adopted daughter Lisa Steinberg, who died two days later from her injuries. The case provoked outrage that did not subside when Steinberg was released from prison in 2004 after serving 15 years.
- February 26, 1988 – A gunman shot rookie NYPD officer Edward Byrne while he was alone in a patrol car monitoring a Jamaica street where a homeowner had reported violence and threats against his house. The blatant, deliberate nature of the killing resulted in widespread outrage, with President Ronald Reagan personally calling the Byrne family to offer condolences. Four men, apparently acting on the orders of a jailed drug dealer, were arrested within a week; all involved are serving lengthy prison sentences.
- December 21, 1988 – Transgender performer Venus Xtravaganza, featured in the documentary film Paris is Burning, was found strangled under a Manhattan hotel bed. The autopsy established that she had been killed four days earlier. No suspects have ever been named.
- April 19, 1989 – Central Park jogger Trisha Meili is violently raped and beaten while jogging in Central Park. The crime is attributed to a group of young men who were practicing an activity the police called "wilding", with five of these teens convicted and jailed. In 2002, after the five had completed their sentences, Matias Reyes – a convicted rapist and murderer serving a life sentence for other crimes – confessed to the crime, after which DNA evidence proved the five teens innocent.
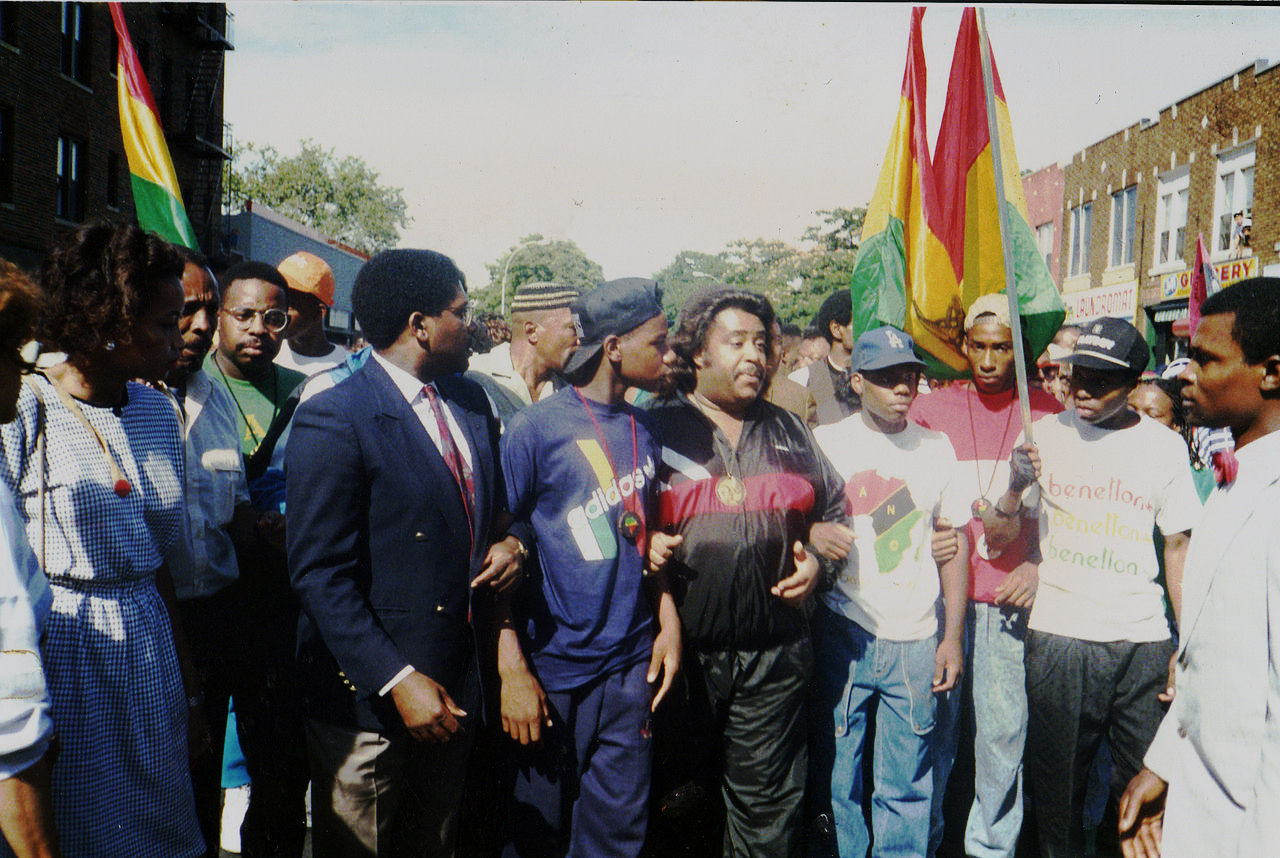
  The Reverend Al Sharpton leading the first protest march over the death of Yusuf Hawkins in Bensonhurst, 1989.
- August 23, 1989 – Yusuf Hawkins, a 16-year-old black student, is set upon and murdered by a white mob in the Bensonhurst neighborhood of Brooklyn.

==== 1990s ====
- March 8, 1990 – The first of the copycat Zodiac Killer Heriberto Seda's eight shooting victims is wounded in an attack in Brooklyn. Between 1990 and 1993, Seda wounds five and kills three in his serial attacks. He is captured in 1996 and convicted in 1998.
- March 25, 1990 – Arson at the illegally operated Happyland Social Club at 1959 Southern Boulevard in the East Tremont section of the Bronx kills 87 people unable to escape the packed dance club, the city's deadliest act of arson ever. Cuban refugee Julio González, who was angry about having been ejected from the club, is arrested, tried and convicted of murder and arson, making the crime also the deadliest to result from a single person's actions in the city's history. González, sentenced to 25 years to life, died in prison in 2016.
- November 5, 1990 – Rabbi Meir Kahane, founder of the Jewish Defense League, is assassinated at the Marriott East Side Hotel at 48th Street and Lexington Avenue by El Sayyid Nosair.
- December 11, 1990 – Senior mafia member, John Gotti is arrested and jailed. Other associates are also arrested.
- January 24, 1991 – Arohn Kee rapes and murders 13-year-old Paola Illera in East Harlem while she is on her way home from school. Her body is later found near the FDR Drive. Over the next eight years, Kee murders two more women before being arrested in February 1999. He is sentenced to three life terms in prison in January 2001.
- July 23, 1991 – The body of a four-year-old girl is found in a cooler on the Henry Hudson Parkway in Inwood, Manhattan. The identity of the child, dubbed "Baby Hope", is unknown until October 2013, when 52-year-old Conrado Juarez is arrested after confessing to killing the girl, his cousin Anjelica Castillo, and dumping her body.
- August 19, 1991 – A Jewish automobile driver accidentally kills a seven-year-old black boy, thereby touching off the Crown Heights riots, during which an Australian Jew, Yankel Rosenbaum, was fatally stabbed by Lemrick Nelson.
- March 11, 1992 – Manuel de Dios Unanue, a Cuban-born journalist who edited several Spanish-language newspapers, was shot to death at a Queens bar. Several men were later convicted in the murder, apparently carried out at the order of the Colombian Cali cartel on whose activities de Dios had reported extensively, the first time the cartel had murdered one of its opponents on American soil.
- September 16, 1992 – During the Patrolmen's Benevolent Association Riot, New York City police officers, many of them openly drinking, block traffic, damage cars, shout racial slurs, and attack members of the news media. Rudolph Giuliani addresses the mob, which had gathered to protest the Mayor Dinkins' proposal for a civilian commission to investigate police misconduct.
- February 26, 1993 – A bomb planted by terrorists explodes in the World Trade Center's underground garage, killing six people and injuring over a thousand, as well as causing much damage to the basement. See: World Trade Center bombing
- December 7, 1993 – Colin Ferguson shoots 25 passengers, killing six, on a Long Island Rail Road commuter train out of Penn Station.
- March 1, 1994 – During the 1994 New York school bus shooting, Rashid Baz, a Lebanese-born Arab immigrant, opens fire on a van carrying members of the Lubavitch Hasidic sect of Jews driving on the Brooklyn Bridge. A 16-year-old student, Ari Halberstam later dies of his wounds. Baz was apparently acting out of revenge for the Cave of the Patriarchs massacre in Hebron, West Bank.
- December 22, 1994 – Anthony Baez, a 29-year-old Bronx man, dies after being placed in an illegal choke-hold by NYPD officer Francis X. Livoti. Livoti is sentenced to 7 1/2 years in 1998 for violating Baez's civil rights.
- November 22, 1995 - Elisa Izquierdo a 6-year-old girl died of a brain hemorrhage inflicted by her mother, Awilda Lopez. Elisa's story made national headlines when it was discovered that New York City's child welfare (now Administration for Children's Services) had missed numerous opportunities to intervene. These failures to protect Elisa subsequently became the inspiration for Elisa's Law, a major restructuring of the city's child welfare system; increasing accountability of all parties involved in child welfare and reducing areas of confidentiality relating to public disclosure in cases of this nature. Elisa's Law was implemented in February 1996.
- November 30, 1995 – Rapper Randy Walker, 27, better known as Stretch, was shot and killed by the occupants of a vehicle passing his minivan in Queens Village, New York, shortly after midnight. No suspects have ever been identified, but it is often believed to be somehow related to his onetime colleague Tupac Shakur's later death since it took place exactly one year after an apparent robbery attempt in Manhattan in which Shakur had been seriously injured.
- December 8, 1995 – A long racial dispute in Harlem over the eviction of a black record-store owner by a Jewish proprietor ends in murder and arson. Fifty-one-year-old Roland Smith, Jr., angry over the proposed eviction, set fire to Freddie's Fashion Mart on 125th Street and opened fire on the store's employees, killing seven and wounding four. Smith also perished in the blaze.
- March 4, 1996 – Second Avenue Deli owner Abe Lebewohl is shot and killed during a robbery. The murder of this popular deli owner and East Village fixture remained unsolved as of 2013.
- March 17, 1996 — During an argument over drug debts, Michael Alig and Robert Riggs kill fellow "Club Kid" Andre Melendez, often known as "Angel" for the winged outfits he wore during the Club Kids' heyday. After keeping his body on ice in a bathtub for several days, Alig ultimately dismembered it and threw the parts in the Hudson River, where they washed up on Staten Island the next month. The pair were not arrested until October, and would eventually serve over a decade in prison after pleading guilty to manslaughter.
- July 4, 1996 – A confrontation between a police officer and subway patron at the 167th Street station on the D train in the Bronx results in the shooting death of Nathaniel Levi Gaines, the patron. Officer Paolo Colecchia was convicted of homicide, the third time that has happened to a police officer in city history.
- February 5, 1997 – Ali Forney, age 22, a homeless, gay, black, and transgender person who advocated for homeless LGBT youth, was found shot dead on a Harlem street. The Ali Forney Center was established in his memory. No suspects have ever been named in the case.
- February 23, 1997 – Abu Ali Kamal, a 69-year-old Palestinian immigrant opens fire on the observation deck of the Empire State Building, killing one and wounding six before taking his own life. In 2007, Kamal's daughter told the New York Daily News that the shooting was politically motivated.
- May 23, 1997 – Michael McMorrow, a real estate agent, was killed, disemboweled and thrown into the lake in Central Park by Christopher Vasquez and Daphne Abdela, a teenage couple. They were nicknamed Baby-Faced Butchers.
- May 30, 1997 – Jonathan Levin, a Bronx teacher and son of former Time Warner CEO Gerald Levin, is robbed and murdered by his former student Corey Arthur.
- August 9, 1997 – Abner Louima is beaten and sodomized with a plunger at the 70th precinct house in Brooklyn by several NYPD officers led by Justin Volpe.
- January 3, 1999 – Kendra Webdale, age 32, is killed after being pushed in front of an oncoming subway train at the 23rd Street station by Andrew Goldstein, a 29-year-old with schizophrenia. The case ultimately led to the passage of Kendra's Law.
- February 4, 1999 – Unarmed African immigrant Amadou Bailo Diallo is shot and killed by four plainclothes police officers, sparking massive protests against police brutality and racial profiling.
- February 15, 1999 – Rapper Lamont Coleman, better known as Big L, is killed in a Harlem drive-by shooting. A friend, Gerard Woodley, was arrested and charged with the murder three months later but then released; no other suspects have ever been identified. Police believe the murder was either revenge for something Coleman's brother had done, or that he was mistaken for his brother.
- March 8, 1999 – Amy Watkins, a 26-year-old social worker from Kansas who worked with battered women in the Bronx, is stabbed to death in a botched robbery near her home in Prospect Heights, Brooklyn. Her two assailants are sentenced to 25 years to life in prison.

=== 21st century ===
==== 2000s ====
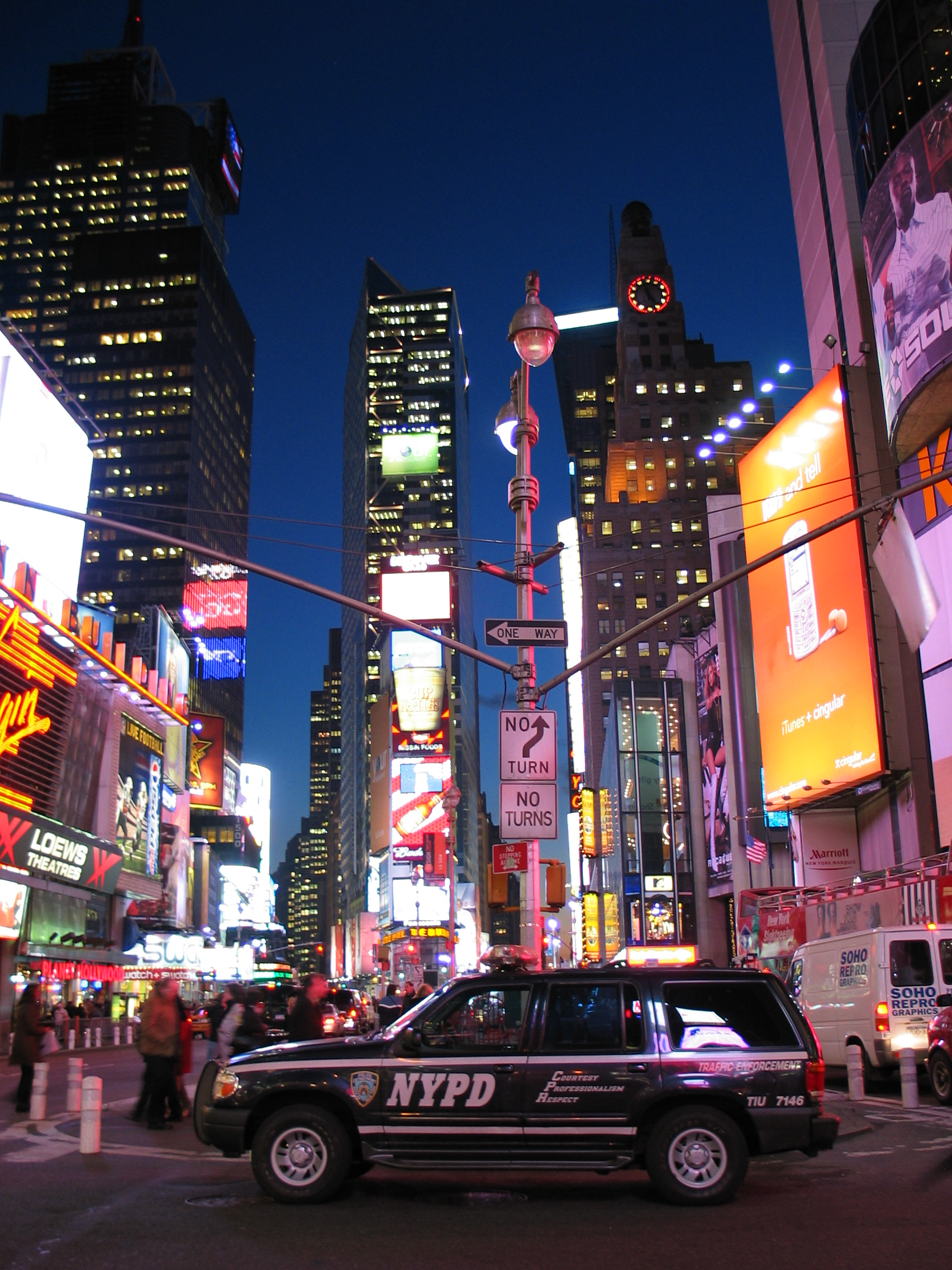
An NYPD vehicle stationed in Times Square in 2005.

- March 16, 2000 – Patrick Dorismond is shot and killed by an NYPD officer in a case of mistaken identity during a drug bust.
- May 24, 2000 – Five employees of a Flushing, Queens, Wendy's restaurant are killed and two are seriously wounded during a robbery that netted the killers $2,400.
- May 10, 2001 – 3 people killed and 2 injured after being tied up in apartment above Carnegie Deli restaurant during a robbery.
- September 11, 2001 – Two jetliners destroy the two 110-story World Trade Center Twin Towers and several surrounding buildings in part of a coordinated terrorist attack, killing 2,606 people who were in the towers and on the ground. It is the deadliest mass-casualty incident in the city's history. That night, Polish immigrant Henryk Siwiak was shot dead in Bedford-Stuyvesant, where he had mistakenly gone to start a new job; due to scarce police resources at that time, the crime remains unsolved. It is the city's only official homicide for that day since the terrorist attack victims are not included in crime statistics.
- October 30, 2002 – Two gunmen went into a Jamaica, Queens recording studio and shot Jason Mizell, 37, better known as Jam Master Jay, a founding member of pioneering hip hop group Run-DMC, in the head at point-blank range; he died shortly thereafter. The murder was a cold case until the arrest of two suspects, Ronald Washington and Karl Jordan Jr., in 2020, followed by that of a third suspect, Jay Bryant, in 2023, after they were indicted on unrelated cocaine trafficking charges. Washington and Jordan were convicted of the murder in 2024 while Bryant is set to be tried in January 2026.
- April 24, 2003 – Romona Moore, a 21-year-old Hunter College student, disappeared after leaving home for a friend's house. The NYPD closed the case after two days. Her body was found on May 15, severely tortured; she had been kept alive for a considerable length of time after the case was closed. The two perpetrators were convicted in a second trial after a mistrial was declared following a courtroom attack by one of them. Moore's family sued the NYPD over what they felt was inadequate attention to the case compared to later cases involving young white women.
- July 23, 2003 – Othniel Askew shoots to death political rival City Council member James E. Davis in the City Hall chambers of the New York City Council.
- October 15, 2003 — One of the Staten Island ferries crashes into the pier at St. George, killing 11. Pilot Richard Smith, who had nodded off due to the side effects of some over-the-counter painkillers he had taken, fled the scene for his home, where he was arrested after having survived two suicide attempts. He was later arrested, and pleaded guilty to manslaughter the next year, for which he was sentenced to 18 months in prison; the city's ferry director also served a year and a day after pleading guilty to the same charge.
- January 27, 2005 – Nicole duFresne, an aspiring actress, is shot dead on the Lower East Side section of Manhattan after being accosted by a group of teenagers. Of the seven accused, Rudy Fleming, Servisio Simmons and Ashley Evans were tried, with Fleming received a life sentence for murder while Simmons and Evans served ten and six year sentences respectively for robbery.
- February 14, 2005 — Rashawn Brazell, 19, of Bushwick, is last seen leaving a subway station with two unidentified individuals. Several days later plastic bags with parts of his dismembered body were found around the neighborhood. In 2017, police arrested a suspect already in custody for another heretofore unsolved Brooklyn homicide and charged him with killing Brazell, who had lived across the street from at the time.
- October 31, 2005 – Fashion journalist Peter Braunstein sexually assaults a co-worker while posing as a fireman, earning him the nickname of the "Fire Fiend" from the city's tabloids. He was arrested after leading officials on a multi-state manhunt. Braunstein was later sentenced to life and will be eligible for parole in 2023.
- January 11, 2006 – Seven-year-old Nixzmary Brown dies after being beaten by her stepfather, Cesar Rodriguez, in their Brooklyn apartment. Rodriguez was convicted of first-degree manslaughter in March 2008.
- February 25, 2006 – 24-year old criminology graduate student Imette St. Guillen is brutally tortured, raped, and killed in New York City after being abducted outside the Falls bar in the SoHo section of Manhattan. 41-year old bouncer Darryl Littlejohn is convicted of the crime and sentenced to life imprisonment.
- July 25, 2006 – Jennifer Moore, an 18-year-old student from New Jersey is abducted and killed after a night of drinking at a Chelsea bar. Her body is found outside a Weehawken motel. Thirty-five-year-old Draymond Coleman was convicted of the crime and sentenced to 50 years in 2010.
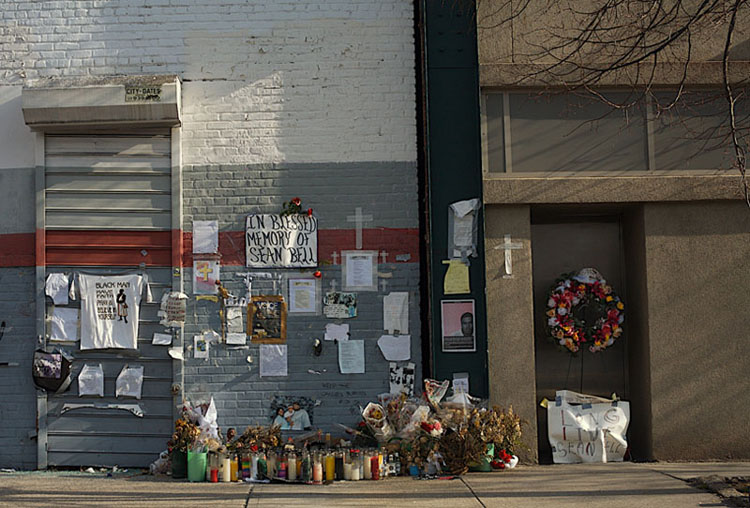
  Memorial to Sean Bell
- August 18, 2006 – 2006 Greenwich Village assault case
- November 1, 2006 – Actress Adrienne Shelly is killed in her apartment by 19-year old Ecuadorian migrant worker Diego Pillco, who attempted to stage her death as a suicide by hanging.
- November 25, 2006 – Four NYPD officers fire a combined 50 shots at a group of unarmed men in Jamaica, Queens, wounding two and killing 23-year-old Sean Bell. The case sparks controversy over police brutality and racial profiling.
- March 14, 2007 – 2007 New York City shooting
- July 9, 2007 – Rookie police officer Russel Timoshenko is shot five times while pulling over a stolen BMW in Crown Heights; he died five days later. A massive manhunt led to the arrest of three men a week later in Pennsylvania, who were eventually convicted of the crime. All three were carrying guns obtained illegally, which led Mayor Michael Bloomberg and other city officials to stiffen city ordinances on illegal firearm possession and seek tighter gun-control laws at the state and national level.
- February 12, 2008 – Psychologist Kathryn Faughey is murdered in her Manhattan office by 39-year old David Tarloff, a mentally-ill man whose intended victim was a psychiatrist in the same practice.
- March 20, 2009 – WABC-AM radio personality George Weber was found stabbed to death in his Brooklyn apartment during an apparent robbery. A teenage boy who had answered an Internet ad Weber placed was later convicted of the crime.

==== 2010s ====
- May 1, 2010 – A bombing in Times Square was thwarted when some shopkeepers and others notified a mounted officer about a 4-wheel-drive vehicle parked illegally. The officer also noticed smoke and explosives and called for backup. 30-year-old Faisal Shahzad, a member of the Pakistani Taliban was arrested and sentenced to life imprisonment on terrorism charges.
- July 22, 2010 – Five members of the Jones family were killed in an apparent case of murder-suicide arson in the Port Richmond section of Staten Island. Although it was initially reported that 14-year-old Romoy "C.J." Raymond was responsible due to being known for setting small-scale fires, it was determined that his mother, 30-year-old Leisa Jones, had killed all four of her children by slitting their throats and committing suicide in the fire.
- February 11, 2011 – Maksim Gelman, 23-years-old, went on a 28-hour rampage, killing four people and wounding five others throughout Brooklyn and Manhattan. He was sentenced to life imprisonment.
- July 13, 2011 – The body of eight-year-old Leiby Kletzky was found dismembered in two locations in Brooklyn after he was murdered by 35-year-old Levi Aron.
- July 31, 2012 – Ramona Moore, 35, disappeared after reportedly arguing with Nasean Bonie, her building superintendent over the rent on her apartment near Crotona Park in the Bronx. Over the next two years, police eventually developed enough evidence to charge him with her murder despite the absence of her body. It was found in Orange County in 2015, the week before his trial was to start, which would have been the first murder prosecution without a body in the borough's history. In 2016, a jury acquitted Bonie, who was already serving time for assaulting his wife, of the murder charge, but convicted him of manslaughter; he was sentenced to 25 years in prison.
- August 24, 2012 – Jeffrey Johnson, 58, shot and killed a former co-worker before being shot and killed by police officers outside of the Empire State Building. A total of 11 people, including the gunman, were shot.
- October 25, 2012 – Lucia and Leo Krim, ages 6 and 2, were stabbed to death by their babysitter, 50-year-old Yoselyn Ortega, in their Upper West Side apartment.
- December 3, 2012 – Death of Ki-Suck Han: Han, 58, of Korean descent, was pushed onto the tracks by 30-year-old Naeem Davis, an immigrant from Sierra Leone, at the Times Square station before eventually being crushed by an oncoming train. The two men had bumped into each other at the turnstiles. Han was drunk and began aggressively engaging Davis. Davis eventually pushed Han away, which caused him to fall onto the tracks. Han had some time to climb back onto the platform, but was too drunk to do so. His case drew controversy, especially due to a photograph that was published of Han on the tracks in the New York Post. Prosecutors brought a murder charge against Davis, to which he pleaded not guilty. In 2017, Davis was acquitted by a jury and released.
- December 27, 2012 – Murder of Sunando Sen: Sen, 46, of Indian descent, was pushed onto an incoming train at 40th Street-Lowery Street station in a hate crime attack by 33-year-old Erika Menendez. In 2015, Menendez was sentenced to 24 years in prison.
- May 18, 2013 – Murder of Mark Carson: Mark Carson, a 32-year-old openly gay African American man, was murdered in Greenwich Village by Elliot Morales. Morales was later convicted of second-degree murder with a hate crime designation.
- January 2, 2014 – Satmar Hasidic businessman Menachem Stark, 39, was kidnapped outside of his office in Williamsburg, Brooklyn during a snowstorm, the intended victim of a robbery. His burned body was found in a trash bin the next day in Great Neck, New York. Of the four cousins indicted in the crime, 29-year-old Kendel Felix was convicted of 2nd-degree manslaughter in September 2016; 32-year-old Irvine Henry pled guilty in February 2017 to conspiracy, hindering prosecution and tampering with physical evidence; 28-year-old Kendall Felix was sentenced in March 2019 to seven years in prison; and 38-year old Erskine Felix, charged with kidnapping and 2nd-degree murder, was sentenced to 15-years-to-life in prison.
- July 17, 2014 – Eric Garner, a 43-year-old Black man on Staten Island, died after a chokehold was applied to him during a confrontation with police over selling untaxed cigarettes. The incident, captured on cellphone video, showed that the asthmatic Garner had repeatedly called out, "I can't breathe!" The case attracted national attention as it occurred three weeks before the equally racially tinged shooting of Michael Brown in Ferguson, Missouri. A grand jury declined to indict Daniel Pantaleo, the officer involved.
- November 17, 2014 – Murder of Wai Kuen Kwok – Kwok, 61, of Chinese descent, was pushed onto an incoming "D" train at 167th Street station. The perpetrator, 36-year-old African-American Kevin Darden, was sentenced to 18 years in prison in a plea deal after initially facing 25 years to life in prison. Darden was a habitual offender who had previously been arrested 50 times. The sentence was criticised by both Kwok's family and James Muriel, the subway motorman who was at the controls of the train that struck Kwok, who stated that the incident destroyed his state of mind. Kwok's death in 2014 meant that the last three victims killed in NYC by being pushed onto subway tracks since 2012 were all Asian-American men.
- November 20, 2014 – A 28-year-old Brooklyn man, Akai Gurley, was shot dead by rookie NYPD officer Peter Liang during a "vertical patrol" on the staircases of Louis H. Pink housing projects in East New York. Liang was convicted of manslaughter in February 2016; he is currently appealing the verdict.
- December 20, 2014 – 2014 Killings of NYPD Officers – Ismaaiyl Brinsley fatally shoots two NYPD officers and then himself in Bedford Stuyvesant, Brooklyn.
- May 2, 2015 – Police officer Brian Moore was shot in Queens by Demetrius Blackwell after Moore and his partner asked Blackwell to stop while walking down the street; Moore died in the hospital two days later. Blackwell was convicted of first-degree murder and sentenced to life in prison.
- May 17, 2015 – Rapper Chinx and another were wounded in a drive-by shooting along Queens Boulevard; he died at the hospital later. Two men, Quincy Homere and Jamar Hill, were charged with the murder in 2017. Homere was already incarcerated for an armed bank robbery committed in November 2015 and pled guilty to a reduced charge of manslaughter in July 2024.
- August 2, 2016 – Murder of Karina Vetrano – Karina Vetrano went for a late afternoon run in Spring Creek Park. Her body was found around 11 pm, with evidence of assault and was ruled a homicide. 22-year-old Chanel Lewis was arrested and tried for her murder and was sentenced to life in prison without the possibility of parole.
- September 2016 – 31 people were injured in a pressure cooker bombing in Chelsea, Manhattan. A bombing occurred earlier that day in Seaside Park, New Jersey, and no one was injured as a result. A suspect in both bombings, 28-year-old Ahmad Khan Rahimi, was arrested the following day after a shootout in Linden, New Jersey that left him and three police officers injured.
- May 18, 2017 – 2017 Times Square car attack: Navy veteran Richard Rojas drove his car on a pedestrian zone. Alyssa Elsme, an 18-year-old tourist from Portage, Michigan, was killed and 20 people were injured.
- June 30, 2017 – Bronx Lebanon Hospital attack: 45-year-old Henry Bello, a former doctor at the facility, shot and killed 32-year-old Tracy Sin-Yee Tam and wounded six other people at the hospital before committing suicide. Tam was randomly targeted after Bello was unable to find his intended target, a different doctor who had accused him of sexual harassment which led to his termination.
- October 31, 2017 – 2017 New York City truck attack: A terrorist attack perpetrated by 29-year-old Sayfullo Saipov killed eight and wounded eleven in Downtown Manhattan.
- June 20, 2018 – Murder of Lesandro Guzman-Feliz: 15-year-old Lesandro "Junior" Guzman-Feliz was killed by members of the Dominican gang Trinitario in the Belmont neighborhood of the Bronx. The death occurred because Guzman-Feliz was mistaken for a member of a rival gang. Public outrage arose when graphic video of the killing began to circulate on the Internet. Video footage shows Guzman-Feliz being dragged out of a bodega by a group of men who repeatedly slash the victim with a machete and stab him with knives. Out of fourteen individuals, all members of the Trinitario gang, five were convicted of his murder in 2019.
- October 5, 2019 – Four homeless men were beaten to death with a heavy blunt object, and a fifth was injured. They were found between 2 a.m. and 5 a.m. on the streets of Chinatown, Manhattan. 24-year-old Randy Rodriguez Santos, also homeless, was arrested.
- December 11, 2019 – Murder of Tessa Majors: 18-year-old Tessa Majors, a freshman at Barnard College, was stabbed and killed during a robbery in Morningside Park. 14-year-olds Luchiano Lewis and Rauchaun Weaver, along with a 13-year-old, whose identity was withheld, were arrested for the crime.

==== 2020s ====
- March 27, 2020 – 2020 New York City Subway fire: On the early morning of March 27, 2020, at around 3:15 AM, 49-year old Nathaniel Avinger set a northbound 2 train of the New York City Subway on fire as it entered the Central Park North–110th Street station in Harlem, Manhattan. The fire killed 36-year old train operator Garrett Goble, injured at least 16 others, and severely damaged the north part of the station and the train cars. Avinger, who was homeless at the time and had been previously convicted of assault, robbery and arson, was arrested four days later after his mugshot was published and has been charged with murder and arson.
- February 12–13, 2021 – Four strangers were stabbed within a 14-hour window along the A train. Two of the victims eventually died from their injuries. Police apprehended a suspect, 21-year old Rigoberto Lopez, homeless and originally from the Dominican Republic, in Upper Manhattan on February 13.
- April 23, 2021 – Killing of Yao Pan Ma: Ma, 61, of Chinese descent, was randomly attacked by 49-year old Jarrod Powell as he was collecting cans along Third Avenue and 125th Street in East Harlem. Ma suffered serious injuries, that eventually caused his death from a cerebral hemorrhage in a long-term care center run by The New Jewish Home on December 31, 2021.
- December 3, 2021 – Killing of Davide Giri: Giri, 30, was an Italian academic at Columbia University when he was stabbed to death in Morningside Park by 25-year old Vincent Pinkney, a member of the Everybody Killer gang.
- January 15, 2022 – Killing of Michelle Go: Go, 40, of Chinese descent, was killed after she was pushed into the path of an oncoming subway train by 61-year old Martial Simon, a homeless Haitian immigrant, at Times Square–42nd Street station, causing her death. Along with the killing of Yao Pan Ma, this incident was against the backdrop amid rising anti-Chinese hate crimes in the city, as well as the country in general since 2020. Simon was initially found unfit to stand trial due to his schizophrenia but passed a mental health evaluation in April 2024 and since been charged with murder.
- February 13, 2022 – Killing of Christina Yuna Lee: Lee, 35 and of Korean descent, was stabbed to death inside her apartment at Chrystie Street by 25-year old Assamad Nash, a black man who had followed her home from the street and into the building. Nash was homeless at the time and had a record of misdemeanor arrests.
- February 28, 2022 – Killing of Gui Ying Ma: Ma, a 62-year-old woman of Chinese descent, was sweeping a sidewalk in Queens the previous year on November 26 when she was attacked with a rock by 32-year old Elisaul Perez. Ma suffered serious injuries as a result, with permanent brain and skull damage. She went into a coma for ten weeks, and although she initially woke up from it in early February, she ultimately died from her injuries, due to complications of a traumatic head injury on February 28. Ma is the fourth American of Asian descent to be killed in the city within the last two months that has been directly attributed to violence against Asian Americans and Pacific Islanders (AAPIs). Perez, initially charged with assault and harassment, was tried for manslaughter after Ma's death and sentenced to 20 years imprisonment in January 2023.
- March 1, 2022 – Steven Zajonc, 28, physically assaulted seven Asian women in Manhattan in a span of two hours in the evening, before he was arrested the next day and charged with hate crimes.
- March 3, 2022 – Harvey Marcelin, known lately as Marceline Harvey and identifying as a transgender woman, was arrested for the murder and dismemberment of 68-year-old Susan Leyden, after having been previously released on other convictions of murder and sexual assault.
- March 12, 2022 – 2022 Northeastern U.S. serial shooter: A man shot two homeless men in Manhattan, killing one. The same man is suspected in three earlier shootings in Washington, D.C., that also targeted homeless men. 30-year old Gerald Brevard III was arrested 3 days after the latest murder.
- March 13, 2022 – Two women working at the Museum of Modern Art were stabbed in a rage and severely injured by 60-year-old Gary Cabana, who was arrested two days later after fleeing and is now being tried for attempted murder.
- April 12, 2022 – 2022 New York City Subway attack: The accused Frank Robert James, a black nationalist, opened fire and shot 10 people on a northbound N train on the New York City Subway in Sunset Park, Brooklyn, and had also threw a smoke grenade. While no one was killed, a few were left with serious injuries.
- April 16, 2022 – Murder of Orsolya Gaal: Gaal, 51, a married mother of two, was found stabbed 58 times in a duffle bag in Forest Park. A 44-year-old handyman David Bonola, who had been living illegally in the U.S. since 2002, was arrested on April 21 as a person of interest and the two reportedly argued before Gaal was killed by the handyman in her basement.
- April 30, 2022 – Murder of Zhiwen Yan: Yan, 45, of Chinese descent, was a food delivery worker on a shift when he was shot and killed on his scooter near 108th Street and 67th Drive in Forest Hills. On June 2, 2022, 51-year-old Glenn Hirsch was charged with his murder. He pleaded not guilty. In August 2022 Hirsch was found dead at his home from a self-inflicted gunshot wound.
- May 11, 2022 – Death of Zinat Hossain: Hossain, 24, was killed when she was pushed under the train at Utica Avenue station by robbers who were trying to steal her bag. Hossain was a Bangladeshi student that attended Hunter College.
- May 22, 2022 – Death of Daniel Enriquez: Enriquez, 48, was riding on a Manhattan-bound Q train when he was shot and killed in what police called a random attack. 25-year old Andrew Abdullah, previously convicted of gang conspiracy and already wanted for car theft since April 28, was arrested and charged with murder.
- May 25, 2022 – Killing of Victor Vega: Vega, 61, was approached by two African-American men while he was walking home at Lexington Avenue near Nostrand Avenue in Bedford-Stuyvesant. The incident, which was caught on surveillance camera, appeared to show the two men intimidating Vega before he turned towards them. One of the men then punched Vega in the face, causing him to fall and land on his back with his head under a parked car. The man then pick-pocketed an unconscious Vega and handed something to his accomplice. Vega was admitted to the Kings County Hospital Center where he subsequently died five days later. His death has been ruled a homicide. 20-year old Isaih James, a member of the Bloods gang, was arrested in August 2023 for a robbery and identified as a perpetrator in the killing.
- January 8–17, 2024 – Five people were stabbed in Brooklyn and Queens in a stabbing spree. Police later apprehended the suspect, 27-year-old Jermain Rigueur, and charged him with attempted murder, assault, and possession of a deadly weapon.
- March 5, 2024 – 44-year-old Collin Small is shot and then dismembered in the Bronx.
- December 4, 2024 – Brian Thompson is fatally shot outside the New York Hilton Midtown in Manhattan.
- December 22, 2024 – Debrina Kawam was immolated to death while she was sleeping in a subway car at the Coney Island-Stillwell Avenue station in Brooklyn.

== Notable recent crime trends ==
=== Late-20th-century trends ===
Freakonomics authors Steven Levitt and Steven Dubner attribute the drop in crime to the legalization of abortion in the 1970s, as they suggest that many would-be neglected children and criminals were never born. On the other hand, Canadian journalist Malcolm Gladwell provides a different explanation in his book The Tipping Point; he argues that crime was an "epidemic" and a small reduction by the police was enough to "tip" the balance. Another theory is that widespread exposure to lead pollution from automobile exhaust, which can lower intelligence and increase aggression levels, incited the initial crime wave in the mid-20th century, most acutely affecting heavily trafficked cities like New York. A strong correlation was found demonstrating that violent crime rates in New York and other big cities began to fall after lead was removed from American gasoline in the 1970s.

==== Gang violence ====
In the 20th century, notorious New York-based mobsters Arnold Rothstein, Meyer Lansky, and Lucky Luciano made headlines. The century's later decades are more famous for Mafia prosecutions (and prosecutors like Rudolph Giuliani) than for the influence of the Five Families.

Violent gangs such as the Black Spades and the Westies influenced crime in the 1970s.

The Bloods, Crips and MS-13 gangs of Los Angeles arrived in the city in the 1980s, but gained notoriety when they appeared on Rikers Island in 1993 to fight off the already established Latin Kings gang.

Chinese gangs were also prominent in Chinatown, Manhattan, notably Ghost Shadows and Flying Dragons.

From the 1990s until their 2013 arrest by the Federal Bureau of Investigation in a sting operation, an Orthodox Jewish gang led by Mendel Epstein and Martin Wolmark kidnapped and tortured a number of Jewish men from Borough Park and Midwood, Brooklyn in troubled marriages to force them into granting religious divorces to their wives, some of whom Epstein charged up to $100,000 to commit the crimes.

=== Child sexual abuse in religious institutions ===
Two cases in 2011 – those of Bob Oliva and Ernie Lorch – have both centered in highly ranked youth basketball programs sponsored by churches of different denominations. In early 2011, Oliva, a long-time basketball coach at Christ the King Regional High School, was accused of two cases of child sexual abuse.

In Manhattan, Father Bruce Ritter, founder of Covenant House, was forced to resign in 1990 after accusations that he had engaged in financial improprieties and had engaged in sexual relations with several youth in the care of the charity.

In December 2012, the president of the Orthodox Jewish Yeshiva University apologized over allegations that two rabbis at the college's high school campus abused boys there in the late 1970s and early 1980s.

=== Nightlife legislation ===
In New York City, legislation was enacted in 2006, affecting many areas of nightlife. This legislation was in response to a number of murders which occurred in the New York City area, some involving nightclubs and bouncers. The city council introduced four pieces of legislation to help combat these problems, including Imette's Law, which required stronger background checks for bouncers. Among the legislative actions taken were the requirement of ID scanners, security cameras, and independent monitors to oversee problem establishments.

It also enacted the following plan:

- Create a city Office of Nightlife Affairs.
- Find ways to get more cops to patrol outside clubs and bars.
- Combat underage drinking and the use of fake IDs.
- Foster better relationship among club owners, the NYPD and the New York State Liquor Authority
- Raise age limit for admittance into a club or bar from 16 to 18 or 21.
- Develop a public-awareness campaign urging patrons to be safe at night.
- Examine zoning laws to help neighborhoods that are flooded with clubs and bars.

A new guideline booklet, NYPD and Nightlife Association Announce "Best Practices, was unveiled on October 18, 2007. This voluntary rule book included a 58-point security plan drafted in part by the New York Nightlife Association, was further recommended by Police Commissioner Ray Kelly and Speaker Christine Quinn. Security measures included cameras outside of nightclub bathrooms, a trained security guard for every 75 patrons and weapons searches for everyone, including celebrities entering the clubs. The new regulation resulted in stricter penalties for serving underage persons.

The Club Enforcement Initiative was created by the NYPD in response to what it referred to as "a series of high-profile and violent crimes against people who visited city nightclubs this year", mentioning the July 27 rape and murder of Jennifer Moore. One article discussed the dangers of police work and undercover investigations.

In August 2006, the New York City Council started initiatives to correct the problems highlighted by the deaths of Moore and St. Guillen. There was also discussions about electronic I.D. scanners. Quinn reportedly threatened to revoke the licenses of bars and clubs without scanners.

In September 2011, the NYPD Nightlife Association updated their Safety Manual Handbook. There is now a section on counterterrorism; this addition came after the planned terrorist attacks on certain bars and clubs worldwide.

== Administration ==
=== Mayors ===
Crime in New York City was high in the 1980s during the Mayor Edward I. Koch years, as the crack epidemic hit New York City, and peaked in 1990, the first year of Mayor David Dinkins's administration (1990–1993), but then began to decline; the number of murders fell from the 1990 peak to a level close to Koch's worst year of 1989 by Dinkins's final year of 1993. The decline accelerated dramatically during the first term of Mayor Rudolph Giuliani (1994–1997), the number of murders falling by sixty percent, and continued to decline, though at much slower rates, during both his second term (1998–2001) and Mayor Michael Bloomberg's three terms (2002–2013).

Scholars differ on the causes of the precipitous decline in crime in New York City (which also coincided with a nationwide drop in crime which some have termed the "Great American Crime Decline"). In a 2007 paper, economist Jessica Reyes attributes a 56 percent drop in nationwide violent crime in the 1990s to the removal of lead (a neurotoxin that causes cognitive and behavioral problems) from gasoline. The Brennan Center for Justice has estimated that between 0% and 5% of the drop in crime in the 1990s may be attributed to higher employment; 5% to 10% of the drop may be attributed to income growth; and 0% to 10% of the drop from increased hiring of police officers.

The Brennan Centre has also stated that the introduction of "compstat" procedures, being a combination of targeted enforcement at crime hot spots and the imposition of greater managerial accountability on police command staff, is the only tactic which has led clearly to subsequent reductions in crime. As law professor Lawrence Rosenthal reported, this was introduced during Giuliani's first term as mayor, together with stop-and-frisk. Economists Steven Levitt and John J. Donohue III argue that the drop in crime in New York City, as in the United States generally, to the legalization of abortion following Roe v. Wade (see legalized abortion and crime effect).

==== David Dinkins ====
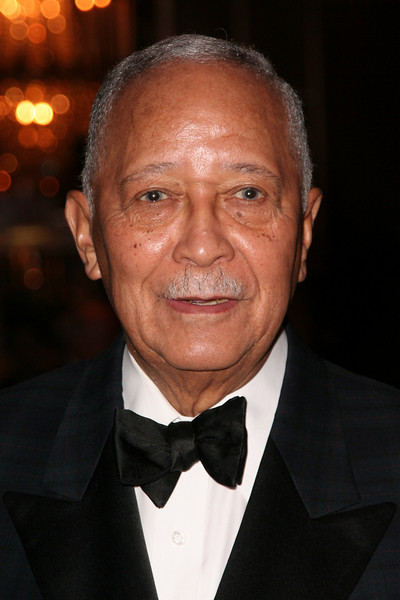
David Dinkins

The rates of most crimes, including all categories of violent crime, made consecutive declines from their peak in his first year, 1990, during the last 36 months of his four-year term. The 30-year upward spiral was ended and a trend of falling rates was initiated that continued beyond his term and accelerated under his successor. Despite the actual abating of crime, Dinkins was hurt by the perception that crime was out of control during his administration. Dinkins also initiated a hiring program that expanded the police department nearly 25%. The New York Times reported, "He obtained the State Legislature's permission to dedicate a tax to hire thousands of police officers, and he fought to preserve a portion of that anticrime money to keep schools open into the evening, an award-winning initiative that kept tens of thousands of teenagers off the street." Dinkins also proposed to create a civilian agency to investigate police misconduct. Police officers opposition to the proposal led to a 1992 police riot, at which Rudolph Giuliani addressed the crowd of officers who damaged cars, chanted racial slurs, and attacked journalists.

==== Rudy Giuliani ====
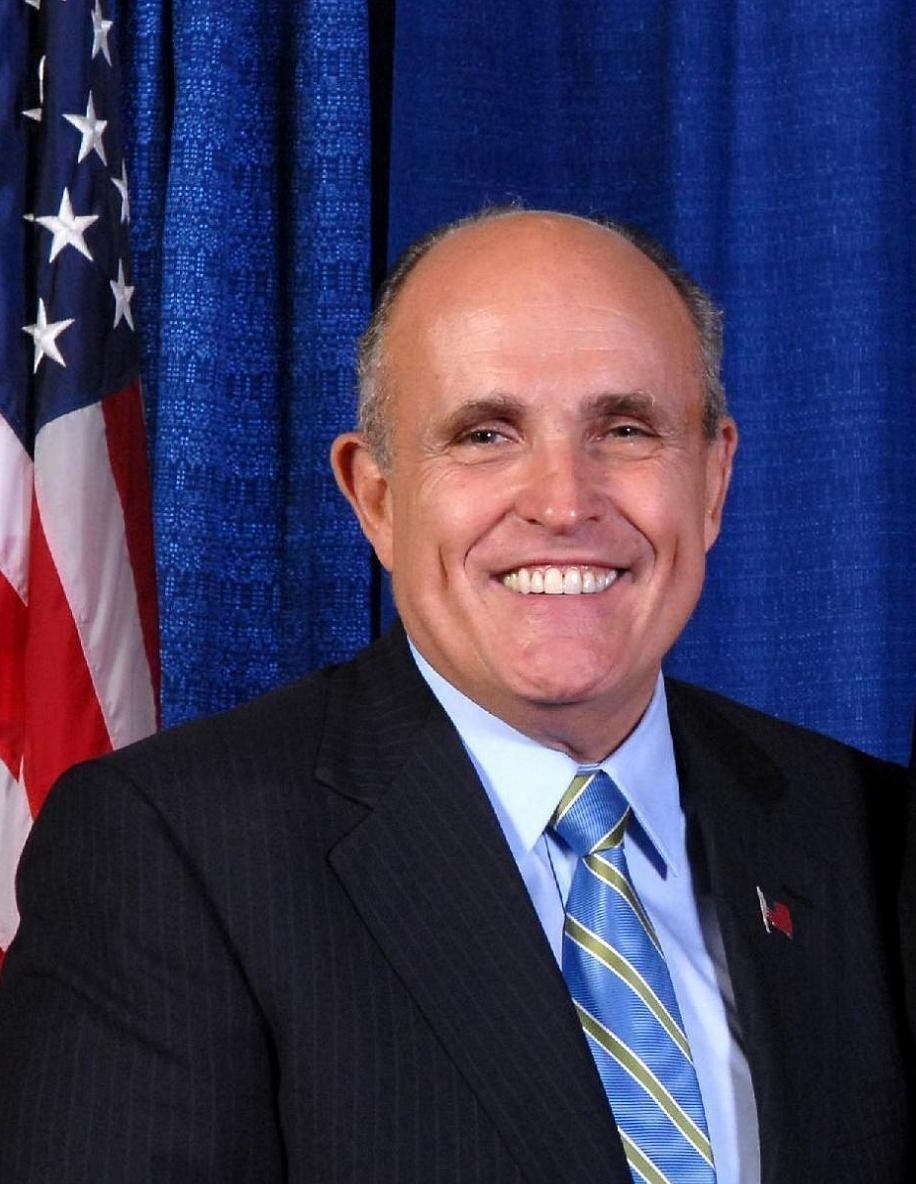
Rudy Giuliani

In Rudolph Giuliani's first term as mayor, the New York City Police Department, under Giuliani appointee Commissioner Bill Bratton, adopted an aggressive enforcement and deterrence strategy based on James Q. Wilson's Broken Windows research. This involved crackdowns on relatively minor offenses such as graffiti, turnstile jumping, and aggressive "squeegeemen", on the principle that this would send a message that order would be maintained and that the city would be "cleaned up".

At a forum three months into his term as mayor, Giuliani mentioned that freedom does not mean that "people can do anything they want, be anything they can be. Freedom is about the willingness of every single human being to cede to lawful authority a great deal of discretion about what you do and how you do it".

Giuliani also directed the New York City Police Department to aggressively pursue enterprises linked to organized crime, such as the Fulton Fish Market and the Javits Center on the West Side (Gambino crime family). By breaking mob control of solid waste removal, the city was able to save businesses over $600 million.

In 1994, in one of his first initiatives, Bratton instituted CompStat, a comparative statistical approach to mapping crime geographically to identify emerging criminal patterns and chart officer performance by quantifying apprehensions. CompStat gave precinct commanders more power, based on the assumption that local authorities best knew their neighborhoods and thus could best determine what tactics to use to reduce crime. In turn, the gathering of statistics on specific personnel aimed to increase accountability of both commanders and officers. Critics of the system assert that it instead creates an incentive to underreport or otherwise manipulate crime data. The CompStat initiative won the 1996 Innovations in Government Award from Harvard Kennedy School. The Brennan Centre for Justice has stated that "compstat" was the only tactic which lead clearly to subsequent reductions in crime.

In 1996, Time magazine featured Bratton, not Giuliani, on its cover as the face of the successful war on crime in New York City. Giuliani forced Bratton out of his position after two years, in what was generally seen as a battle of two large egos in which Giuliani was unable to accept Bratton's celebrity.

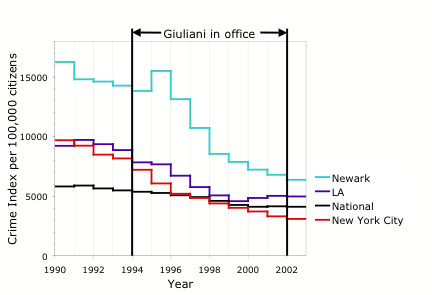
National, New York City, and other major city crime rates (1990–2002)

Giuliani continued to highlight crime reduction and law enforcement as central missions of his mayoralty throughout both terms. These efforts were largely successful. However, concurrent with his achievements, a number of tragic cases of abuse of authority came to light, and numerous allegations of civil rights abuses were leveled against the NYPD. Giuliani's own deputy mayor, Rudy Washington, alleged that he had been harassed by police on several occasions. More controversial still were several police shootings of unarmed suspects, and the scandals surrounding the sexual torture of Abner Louima and the killing of Amadou Diallo. In a case less nationally publicized than those of Louima and Diallo, unarmed bar patron Patrick Dorismond was killed shortly after declining the overtures of what turned out to be an undercover officer soliciting illegal drugs. Even while hundreds of outraged New Yorkers protested, Giuliani staunchly supported the New York City Police Department, going so far as to take the unprecedented step of releasing Dorismond's "extensive criminal record" to the public, for which he came under wide criticism. While many New Yorkers accused Giuliani of racism during his terms, former mayor Ed Koch defended him as even-handedly harsh: "Blacks and Hispanics ... would say to me, 'He's a racist!' I said, 'Absolutely not, he's nasty to everybody'."

The amount of credit Giuliani deserves for the drop in the crime rate is disputed. He may have been the beneficiary of a trend already in progress. Crime rates in New York City started to drop in 1991 under previous mayor David Dinkins, three years before Giuliani took office. A small but significant nationwide drop in crime also preceded Giuliani's election, and continued throughout the 1990s. Two likely contributing factors to this overall decline in crime were federal funding of an additional 7,000 police officers and an improvement in the national economy. Many experts believe changing demographics were the most significant cause. Some have pointed out that during this time, murders inside the home, which could not be prevented by more police officers, decreased at the same rate as murders outside the home. Also, since the crime index is based on the FBI crime index, which is self-reported by police departments, some have alleged that crimes were shifted into categories that the FBI does not quantify.

According to some analyses, the crime rate in New York City fell even more in the 1990s and 2000s than nationwide and therefore credit should be given to a local dynamic: highly focused policing. In this view, as much as half of the reduction in crime in New York in the 1990s, and almost all in the 2000s, is due to policing. Opinions differ on how much of the credit should be given to Giuliani, to Bratton, and to Ray Kelly, who had previously served under Dinkins and criticized aggressive policing under Giuliani.

Among those crediting Giuliani for making New York safer were several other cities nationwide whose police departments subsequently instituted programs similar to Bratton's CompStat.

In 2005, Giuliani was reportedly nominated for a Nobel Peace Prize for his efforts to reduce crime rates in the city. The prize went instead to Mohamed ElBaradei and the International Atomic Energy Agency for their efforts to reduce nuclear proliferation.

==== Michael Bloomberg ====
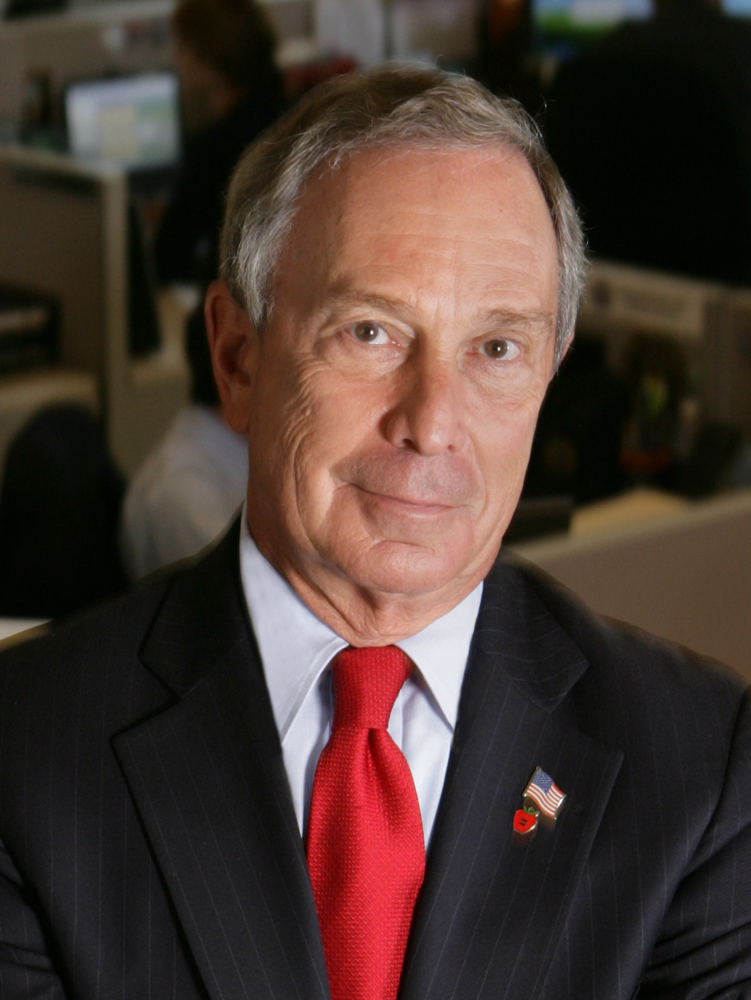
Michael Bloomberg

Starting in 2005, under the mayoral tenure of Michael Bloomberg, New York City achieved the lowest crime rate among the ten-largest cities in the United States. After 1991, the city saw an uninterrupted fifteen-year trend of decreasing crime. Neighborhoods that were once considered dangerous are now much safer. Violent crime in the city has dropped by three quarters in the twelve years ending in 2005 with the murder rate at its lowest then level since 1963 with 539 murders that year, for a murder rate of 6.58 per 100,000 people, compared to 2,245 murders in 1990. The murder rate continued to drop each year since then. In 2012, there were 414 murders, mainly occurring in the outlying, low income areas of NYC. In 2014, there were 328 murders, the lowest number since the introduction of crime statistics in 1963. Among the 182 U.S. cities with populations of more than 100,000, New York City ranked 136th in overall crime.

In 2006, as part of Mayor Michael Bloomberg's gun control efforts, the city approved new legislation regulating handgun possession and sales. The new laws established a gun offender registry, required city gun dealers to inspect their inventories and file reports to the police twice a year, and limited individual handgun purchases to once every 90 days. The regulations also banned the use and sale of kits used to paint guns in bright or fluorescent colors, on the grounds that such kits could be used to disguise real guns as toys. In April, along with Boston mayor Thomas Menino, Bloomberg co-founded Mayors Against Illegal Guns. A December 2013 press release by the group said the bipartisan coalition included over 1,000 mayors. As mayor, Bloomberg increased the mandatory minimum sentence for illegal possession of a loaded handgun, saying: "Illegal guns don't belong on our streets and we're sending that message loud and clear. We're determined to see that gun dealers who break the law are held accountable, and that criminals who carry illegal loaded guns serve serious time behind bars." He opposes the death penalty, saying he would "rather lock somebody up and throw away the key and put them in hard labor."

In July 2007, the city planned to install an extensive web of cameras and roadblocks designed to detect, track and deter terrorists called Lower Manhattan Security Initiative.

In 2007, New York City had 494 reported homicides, down from 596 homicides in 2006, and the first year since 1963 (when crime statistics were starting to be published) that this total was fewer than 500. though homicides rose (to 523) in 2008, they fell again in 2009 to 466, an almost fifty-year low. Homicides continued to decline, with the city reporting 414 in 2012 and only 333 in 2013.

Data tracking criminal complaints in seven major felony offenses (a key performance indicator used by the NYPD) were as follows:

Criminal Complaints in Seven Major Felony Offenses During the Bloomberg Administration 2002—2013
Offense	2002	2003	2004	2005	2006	2007	2008	2009	2010	2011	2012	2013
Murder & Non-Negligent Manslaughter	587	597	570	539	596	496	523	471	536	515	419	335
Rape	2,144	2,070	1,905	1,858	1,525	1,351	1,299	1,205	1,373	1,420	1,445	1,378
Robbery	27,229	25,989	24,373	24,722	23,739	21,809	22,401	18,601	19,486	19,717	20,144	19,128
Felony Assault	21,147	19,139	18,622	17,750	17,309	17,493	16,284	16,773	16,956	18,482	19,381	20,297
Burglary	31,275	29,110	26,976	24,117	23,143	21,762	20,725	19,430	18,600	18,720	19,168	17,429
Grand Larceny	45,771	46,751	48,763	48,243	46,625	44,924	44,242	39,580	37,835	38,501	42,497	45,368
Grand Larceny Of Motor Vehicle	26,656	23,413	20,884	18,246	15,745	13,174	12,482	10,670	10,329	9,314	8,093	7,400
Total Seven Major Felony Offenses	154,809	147,069	142,093	135,475	128,682	121,009	117,956	106,730	105,115	106,669	111,147	111,335

==== Bill de Blasio ====
Bill de Blasio was sworn in office as mayor on January 1, 2018, he was sworn in as mayor of New York.

Until 2018, crime under the de Blasio administration continued a generally downward trend. In January 2020 robberies were up 39% from the previous year, shootings were up 29% and car theft was up 72%. Likewise, February and March saw 20% increases in major index crimes. De Blasio said that the consecutive months of 20% increases had been caused by recent bail reforms. Some advocacy groups who support the bail reforms accused the NYPD of misclassifying non-index crimes to put pressure on politicians in Albany. While the cause remains a subject of debate, recent changes to stop and frisk may have also had an impact, a view that was supported by former police commissioner Raymond W. Kelly.

In June 2020, gun violence spiked to the highest levels seen in nearly 25 years. De Blasio responded that more officers would be on the streets:

"We're not going back to the bad old days when there was so much violence in the city, nor are we going back to the bad old days where policing was done the wrong way, and, in too many cases, police and community could never connect and find that mutual respect."

Unlike the crime increases from earlier months, June also saw a spike in murders, up 134% over the previous year. August saw shootings more than double compared to the previous year.

Data tracking criminal complaints in seven major felony offenses, a key performance indicator used by the NYPD, were as follows:

Criminal Complaints in Seven Major Felony Offenses During the de Blasio Administration (2014—2021)
Offense	2014	2015	2016	2017	2018	2019	2020	2021
Murder & Non-Negl. Manslaughter	333	352	335	292	295	319	468	488
Rape	1,352	1,438	1,438	1,449	1,794	1,755	1,427	1,491
Robbery	16,539	16,931	15,500	13,956	12,913	13,371	13,106	13,831
Felony Assault	20,207	20,270	20,847	20,052	20,208	20,698	20,572	22,835
Burglary	16,765	15,125	12,990	12,083	11,687	10,783	15,478	12,811
Grand Larceny	43,862	44,005	44,279	43,150	43,558	43,250	35,505	40,870
Grand Larceny Of Motor Vehicle	7,664	7,332	6,327	5,676	5,428	5,430	9,037	10,415
Total Seven Major Felony Offenses	106,722	105,453	101,716	96,658	95,883	95,606	95,593	102,741

==== Eric Adams ====
The election of Eric Adams as mayor was widely seen as a response by the electorate to concerns about rising crime. In March 2024 Adams said violent crime on the subway was being driven by recidivism: "We don't have a surge in crime. We have a surge in recidivism." Assaults on police officers continued to increase. Adams attributed it to an "erosion of expectation of authority". Police officials blamed criminal justice reform efforts in general for failing to deter attacks on cops with alternatives to incarceration programs. According to Mike LiPetri "only about 8% of the arrest population for assault actually does any kind of jail".

The fatal shooting of police officer Jonathan Diller in March 2024 called into question the administration's claims of a decline in crime. The man who killed Officer Diller was a parolee with 21 prior arrests. Adams spoke from Jamaica Hospital after meeting Diller's wife: "It is the good guys against the bad guys".

Data tracking criminal complaints in seven major felony offenses, a key performance indicator used by the NYPD, were as follows:

Criminal Complaints in Seven Major Felony Offenses During the de Adams Administration (2022—2025)
Offense	2022	2023	2024	2025
Murder & Non-Negl. Manslaughter	438	391	382	309
Rape	1,617	1,455	1,748	2,048
Robbery	17,411	16,910	16,580	15,075
Felony Assault	26,063	27,876	29,461	29,838
Burglary	15,746	13,773	13,070	12,798
Grand Larceny	51,565	50,586	48,450	48,061
Grand Larceny Of Motor Vehicle	13,749	15,795	14,199	13,523
Total Seven Major Felony Offenses	126,589	126,786	123,890	121,652

=== Police commissioners ===
Two of the most influential police commissioners of New York City, Raymond Kelly and William Bratton, helped to greatly reduce the city's crime rate. The New York Times has called both men "the city's most significant police leaders of the past quarter-century." However, New York City crime started to decline in 1991 under Lee Brown, the second Black police commissioner in history.

==== Lee Brown ====
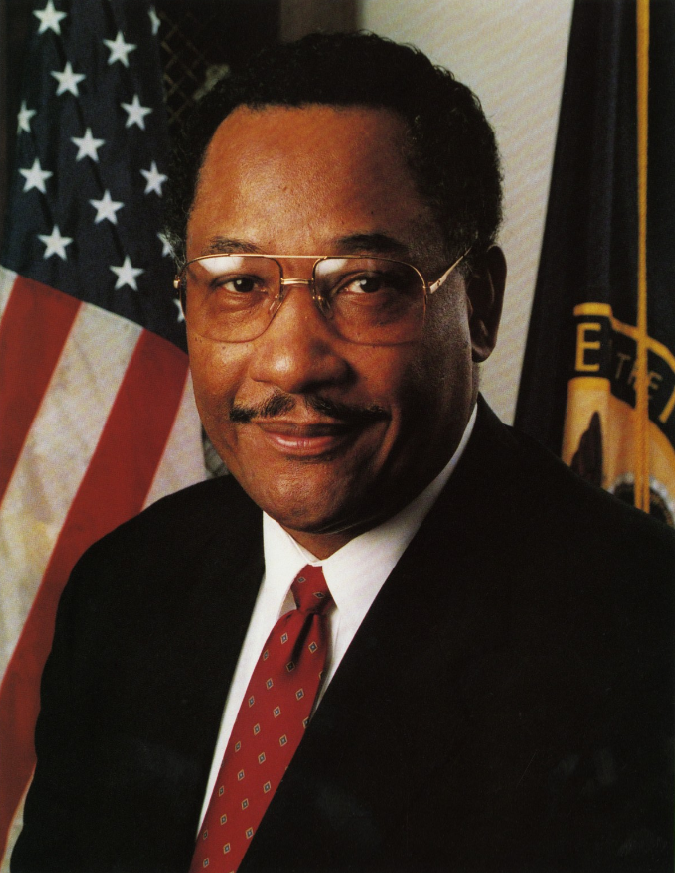
Lee Brown

In December 1989, David Dinkins appointed Lee Brown as the 36th Police Commissioner of New York City, and the second Black police commissioner in the city's history. Crime peaked for the first time in NYC history in 1990, but starting in 1991, crime began to decrease under Brown's community policing policies implemented within the department. Brown resigned in September 1992.

==== Ray Kelly ====
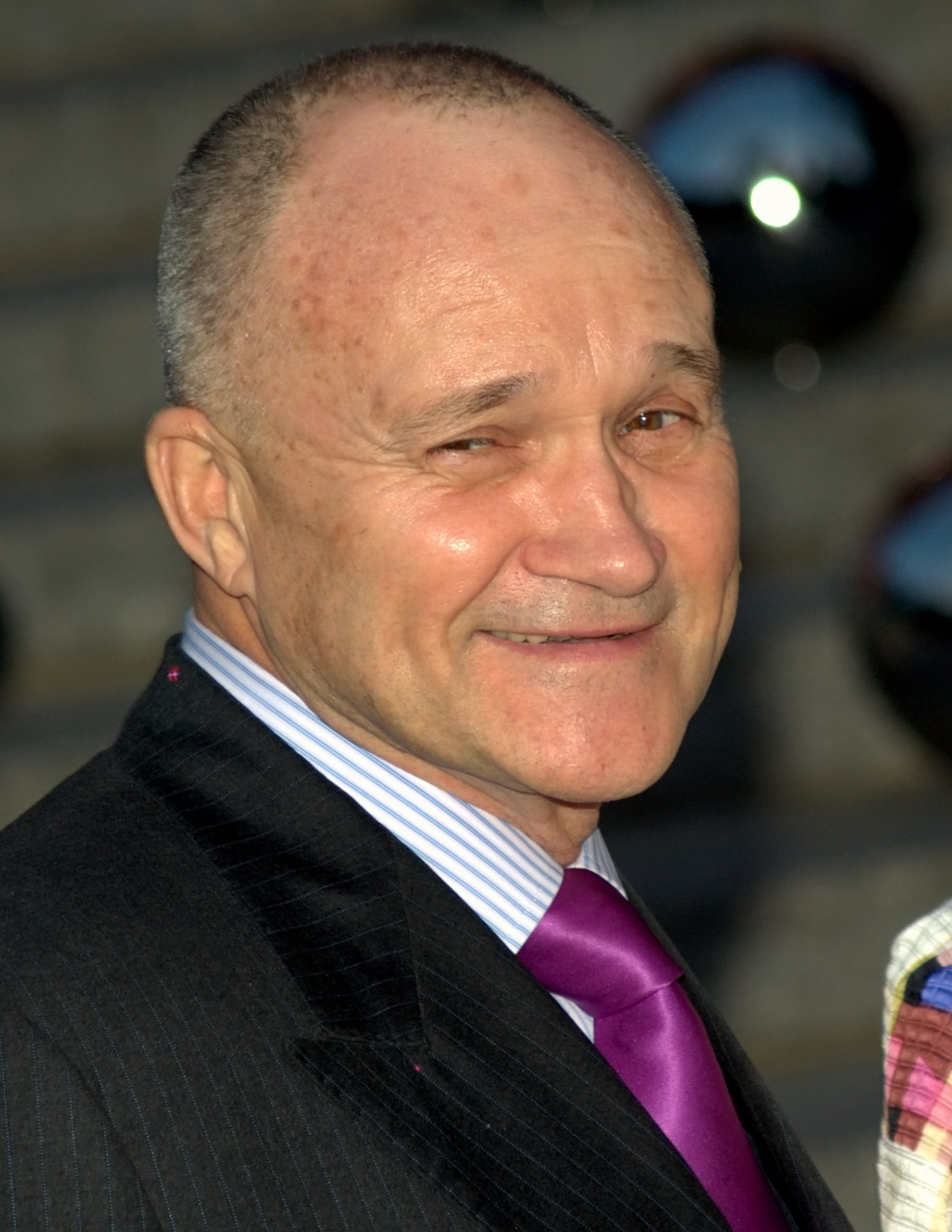
Ray Kelly

On October 16, 1992, David Dinkins appointed Raymond Kelly the 37th Police Commissioner of the City of New York. The national decline in both violent crime and property crime began in 1993, during the early months of Raymond Kelly's commissionership under Dinkins. At the time a firm believer in community policing, Kelly helped spur the decline in New York City by instituting the Safe Streets, Safe City program, which put thousands more cops on the streets, where they would be visible to and able to get to know and interact with local communities. As the 37th commissioner, he also pursued quality of life issues, such as the "squeegee man" that had become a sign of decay in the city. The murder rate in New York City had declined from its 1990 mid-Dinkins-administration historic high of 2,254 to 1,927, when Kelly left in 1994, and continued to plummet even more steeply under Mayors Giuliani and Bloomberg.

The decline continued when Kelly returned as 41st Commissioner under Mayor Bloomberg in 2002–2013. As commissioner of the NYPD under Mayor Michael Bloomberg, Kelly had often appeared at outreach events such as the Brooklyn's annual West Indian Day Parade, where he was photographed playing the drums and speaking to community leaders. Bloomberg and Kelly, however, continued to place heavy reliance on the CompStat system, initiated by Bill Bratton and since adopted by police departments in other cities worldwide. The system, while recognized as highly effective in reducing crime, also puts pressure on local precincts to reduce the number of reports for the seven major crimes while increasing the number of lesser arrests.

Bloomberg and Kelly continued and indeed stepped up Mayor Giuliani's controversial stop-and-frisk policy, which is considered by some to be a form of racial profiling. In the first half of 2011, the NYC police made 362,150 such arrests, constituting a 13.5 percent increase from the same period in 2010, according to WNYC radio (which also reported that 84 percent of the people stopped were either black or Latino, and that "nine out 10 stops did not result in any arrest or ticket".) According to New York State Senator Eric Adams, "Kelly was one of the great humanitarians in policing under David Dinkins. I don't know what happened to him that all of a sudden his philosophical understanding of the importance of community and police liking each other has changed. Sometimes the expeditious need of bringing down crime numbers bring out the worst in us. So instead of saying let's just go seek out the bad guy, we get to the point of, 'Let's go get them all.' If Kelly can't philosophically change, then we need to have a leadership change at the top."

Under Bloomberg, Commissioner Kelly also revamped New York City's Police Department into a world-class counter-terrorism operation, operating in conjunction with the CIA. Prior to the September 11, 2001 attacks there were fewer than two dozen officers working on terrorism full-time; ten years later there were over 1,000. One of Kelly's innovations was his unprecedented stationing of New York City police detectives in other cities throughout the world following terrorist attacks in those cities, with a view to determining if they are in any way connected to the security of New York. In the cases of both the March 11, 2004, Madrid bombing and the July 7, 2005 London bombings and July 21, 2005 London bombings, NYPD detectives were on the scene within a day to relay pertinent information back to New York. An August 2011 article by the Associated Press reported the NYCPD's extensive use of undercover agents (colloquially referred to as "rakers" and "mosque crawlers") to keep tabs, even build databases, on stores, restaurants, mosques. and clubs. NYPD spokesman Paul Browne denied that police trawled ethnic neighborhoods, telling the AP that officers only follow leads. He also dismissed the idea of "mosque crawlers", saying, "Someone has a great imagination."

According to Mother Jones columnist Adam Serwer, "The FBI was reportedly so concerned about the legality of the NYPD's program that it refused to accept information that came out of it." Valerie Caproni, the FBI's general counsel, told the AP that the FBI is barred from sending agents into mosques looking for leads outside of a specific investigation and said the practice would raise alarms. "If you're sending an informant into a mosque when there is no evidence of wrongdoing, that's a very high-risk thing to do," she was quoted as saying. "You're running right up against core constitutional rights. You're talking about freedom of religion."

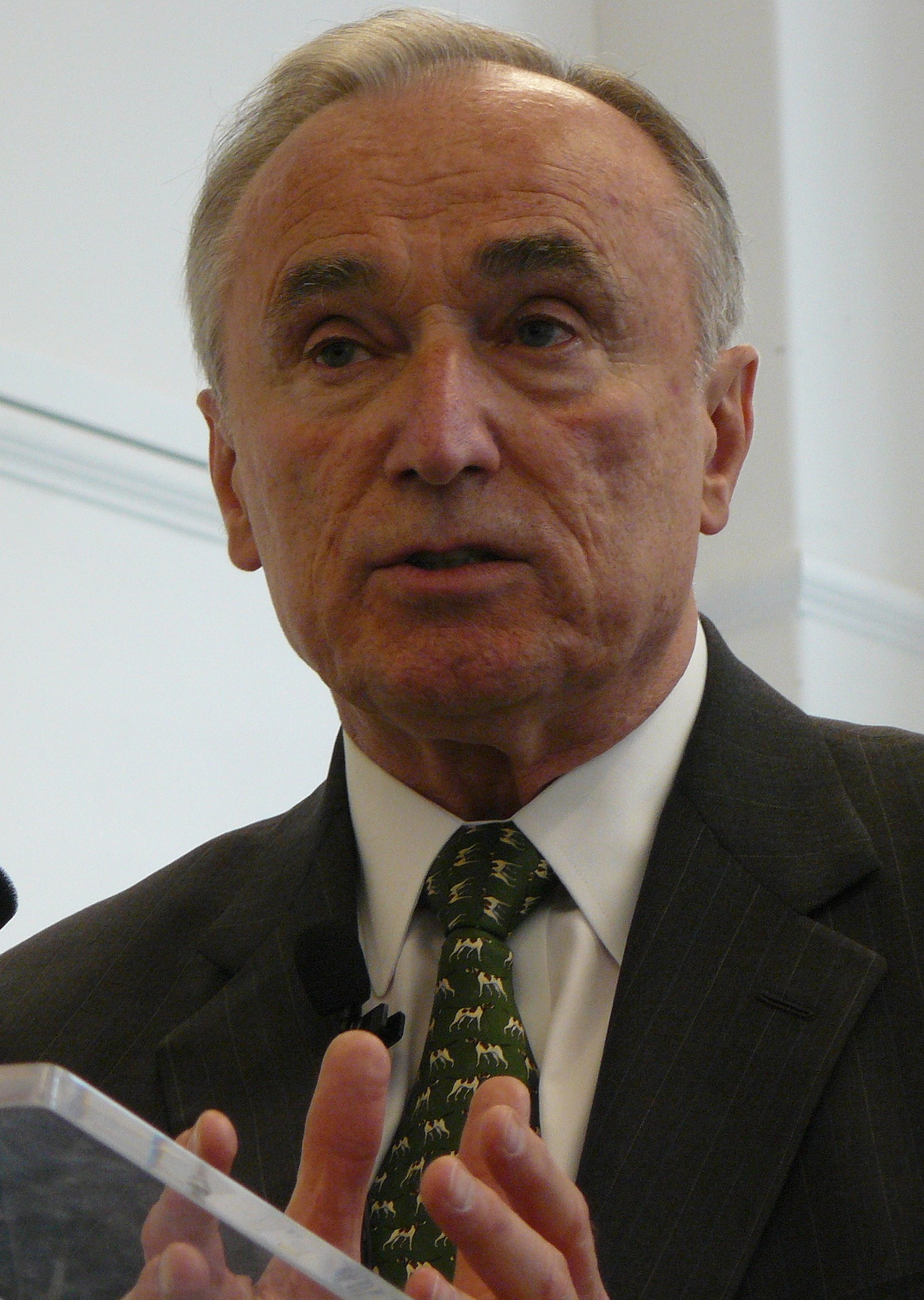
Bill Bratton

Under Mayor Bloomberg, Kelly's NYPD also incurred criticism for its handling of the protests surrounding the 2004 Republican National Convention, which resulted in the City of New York having to pay out millions in settlement of lawsuits for false arrest and civil rights violations, as well as for its rough treatment of credentialed reporters covering the 2011 Occupy Wall Street demonstrations.

On March 5, 2007, it was announced that a Rikers Island inmate offered to pay an undercover police officer posing as a hit man to behead Kelly as well as bomb police headquarters in retaliation for the controversial police shooting of Sean Bell.

==== Bill Bratton ====
Bill Bratton became the chief of the New York City Transit Police in 1990. In 1991 the Transit Police gained national accreditation under Bratton. The department became one of only 175 law-enforcement agencies in the country and only the second in New York State to achieve that distinction. The following year it was also accredited by the State of New York, and by 1994, there were almost 4,500 uniformed and civilian members of the department, making it the sixth largest police force in the United States. Bratton had left the NYC Transit Police returning to Boston in 1992 to head the Boston Police Department, one of his long-time ambitions. In 1994, Bratton was appointed the 38th Commissioner of the NYPD by Mayor Rudolph W. Giuliani. He cooperated with Giuliani in putting the broken windows theory into practice. He had success in this position and introduced the CompStat system of tracking crimes, which proved successful in reducing crime in New York City and is still in use today. A new tax surcharge enabled the training and deployment of around 5,000 new better-educated police officers, police decision-making was devolved to precinct level, and a backlog of 50,000 unserved warrants was cleared. Bratton resigned in 1996.

On December 5, 2013, New York City mayor-elect Bill de Blasio named Bratton as New York City's new Police Commissioner to replace Raymond Kelly after de Blasio's swearing-in on January 1, 2014. The New York Times reported that at Bratton's swearing-in on January 2, 2014, the new Police Commissioner praised his predecessor Raymond Kelly, but also signaled his intention to strike a more conciliatory tone with ordinary New Yorkers who had become disillusioned with policing in the city: "We will all work hard to identify why is it that so many in this city do not feel good about this department that has done so much to make them safe — what has it been about our activities that have made so many alienated?".

==== Howard Safir ====
Howard Safir became Police Commissioner in April 1996 after the first resignation of William Bratton. Safir continued Bratton's crime-cutting initiatives and policies, and implemented his own initiative, Courtesy, Professionalism and Respect that has been plastered on every police car in NYC since 1997. Safir left office in August 2000, replaced by Bernard Kerik.

== Murders by year ==
Year	Murders
1928	404 (Note: 1928: First year tabulated.)
1929	425
1930	494
1931	588
1932	579
1933	541
1934	458
1935	
1936	510
1937–1938	
1939	291
1940	275
1941	268
1942	265
1943	201
1944	288
1945	292
1946	346
1947	333
1948	315
1949	301
1950	294
1951	243
1952	309
1953	350
1954	342
1955	306
1956	315
1957	314
1958	354

Year	Murders
1959	390
1960	482
1961	483
1962	631
1963	548
1964	636
1965	634
1966	654
1967	746
1968	986
1969	1043
1970	1117
1971	1466
1972	1691
1973	1680
1974	1554
1975	1645
1976	1622
1977	1557
1978	1504
1979	1733
1980	1814
1981	1826
1982	1668
1983	1622
1984	1450
1985	1384
1986	1582
1987	1672
1988	1896

Year	Murders
1989	1905
1990	2245 (Note: 1990: Highest total to date.)
1991	2154
1992	1995
1993	1946
1994	1561
1995	1177
1996	983
1997	770
1998	633
1999	671
2000	673
2001	649 (Note: 2001: Not including the September 11 attacks.)
2002	587
2003	597
2004	570
2005	539
2006	596
2007	496
2008	523
2009	471
2010	536
2011	515
2012	419
2013	335
2014	333
2015	352
2016	335
2017	292
2018	295

Year	Murders
2019	319
2020	468
2021	488
2022	438
2023	391
2024	377
2025	303

Number of murders in New York City per year from 1928 to 2023, based on the table

== Specific locations ==
The boroughs of Queens and Staten Island have historically had lower crime rates compared to Brooklyn, The Bronx and Manhattan. Since 1985, the Bronx has consistently had the highest homicide and violent crime rate among the five boroughs.

Index Crime Rates by Borough (per 100,000 population)
The Bronx	Brooklyn	Manhattan	Queens	Staten Island
3,540.1	2,438.5	4,403.5	2,236.1	1,479.8

Violent Crime Rates by Borough (per 100,000 population)
The Bronx	Brooklyn	Manhattan	Queens	Staten Island
1,290.2	669.0	823.3	526.3	359.8

=== The Bronx ===
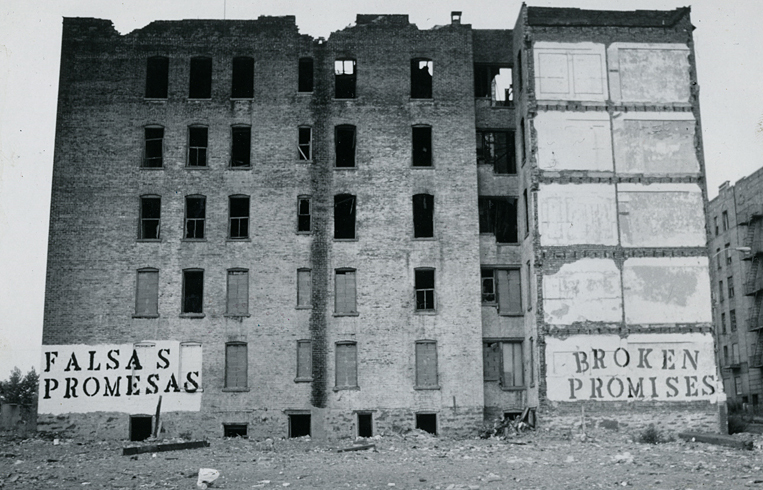
Burned-out building, Charlotte Street

With some of the poorest neighborhoods in the country, the Bronx, specifically the South Bronx, became noteworthy as a high-crime area in the later part of the 20th century. Beginning in the 1960s, White flight, landlord abandonment, a decline in city services, reduced investment, economic changes, changing demographics, and the construction of the Cross Bronx Expressway (CBE) all contributed to the borough's decay.

The construction of expressways in the Bronx, especially the CBE within the South Bronx, divided several neighborhoods and displaced thousands of residents and businesses. The already poor and working-class neighborhoods were further disadvantaged by the decreasing property value and increasing vacancy rates. Racial tensions during the Civil Rights Movement of the 1950s and 1960s further contributed to middle-class flight and the decline of many neighborhoods. By the late 1960s, the vacancy rate of homes in the South Bronx was the highest of any place in the city.

The early 1970s saw South Bronx property values continue to plummet to record lows, as the city experienced a fiscal crisis. Primarily, White flight led to abandonment and deterioration of large numbers of buildings. This, coupled with a stagnant economy and an extremely high unemployment rate, attracted increased social problems including the proliferation of street gangs and a large number of squatters. This had a domino effect, leading landlords of nearby apartment buildings to neglect their properties as well. Police statistics show that as the crime wave moved north across the Bronx, the remaining white tenants in the South Bronx (mostly elderly Jews) were preferentially targeted for violent crime by the influx of young, minority criminals because they were seen as easy prey. This became so common that the slang terms "crib job" (meaning how elderly residents were as helpless as infants) and "push in" (home invasion) were coined specifically in reference to them.

Moreover, South Bronx residents were reportedly burning down vacant properties, either for scrap or to get better housing, while some landlords were doing the same in order to collect the insurance money. Media attention brought the Bronx, especially its southern half, into common interest nationwide. The phrase "The Bronx is burning", attributed to Howard Cosell during a Yankees World Series game in 1977, refers to the arson epidemic caused by the total economic collapse of the South Bronx during the 1970s. During the game, as ABC switched to a generic helicopter shot of the exterior of Yankee Stadium, an uncontrolled fire could clearly be seen burning in the ravaged South Bronx surrounding the park. By the time of Cosell's 1977 commentary, dozens of buildings were being burned in the South Bronx every day, sometimes whole blocks at a time. The local police precincts – already struggling and failing to contain the Bronx's massive wave of drug and gang crime – had long since stopped bothering to investigate the fires, since there were too many to track.

The 1975 New York City fiscal crisis was succeeded by the New York City blackout of 1977, which triggered massive looting that bankrupted stores. By 1979, many Bronx neighborhoods went aflame and were turned into rubble. Apartment buildings were abandoned or sold to lesser landlords amid rapid urban decay. Its high schools became notorious as the city's worst, and it was struck by the crack epidemic. During the 1970s, the NYPD's 41st Precinct Station House at 1086 Simpson Street became known as "Fort Apache, The Bronx". By 1980, the 41st was renamed "The Little House on the Prairie", as two-thirds of the area's 94,000 residents had fled, and the station house was one of the few buildings that had not been abandoned or burnt down. In total, over 40% of the South Bronx was burned or abandoned between 1970 and 1980; 44 census areas lost more than 50% of their area to fires, and seven lost over 97% of their buildings to arson or abandonment. The appearance was frequently compared to that of a bombed-out and evacuated European city following World War II. One of the most drastic cases of this was Charlotte Street in Crotona Park East—the street had become so deteriorated that part of it was de-mapped in 1974. After President Jimmy Carter personally visited Charlotte Street in 1977, he ordered the head of the U.S. Department of Housing and Urban Development to take steps to salvage the area.

Despite significant investment compared to the post-war period, many exacerbated social problems remain in many neighborhoods including high rates of violent crime, substance abuse, overcrowding, and substandard housing conditions. The Bronx has the highest rate of poverty in New York City, and the greater South Bronx is the poorest area.

=== Brooklyn ===
Neighborhoods such as Brownsville, Canarsie, and East New York used to be majority Italian and Jewish, but have shifted into mostly Black and Hispanic communities. Between the 1950s and 1970s a demographic shift occurred, the borough lost almost 500,000 people, most of them White, and at the same time the crime rate in Brooklyn increased. Those residents moved to neighboring boroughs of Queens and Staten Island, in addition to suburban counties of Long Island and New Jersey.

==== Central Brooklyn ====
In 1961, Alfred E. Clark of The New York Times referred to Bedford–Stuyvesant as "Brooklyn's Little Harlem". One of the first urban riots of the era took place there. Social and racial divisions in the city contributed to the tensions. In 1964, a race riot started in Harlem, Manhattan, after an Irish NYPD lieutenant, Thomas Gilligan shot and killed a black teenager named James Powell, who was only 15. Race relations between the NYPD and the city's black community strained as police were seen as an instrument of oppression and racially biased law enforcement.

On top of this, few black officers were present on the force. In predominantly black New York neighborhoods, arrests and prosecutions for drug-related crimes were higher than anywhere else in the city, despite evidence that illegal drugs were being used at the same rate in white communities. This further contributed to the problems between the white dominated police force and the black community. Race riots followed in 1967 and 1968 as part of the political and racial tensions in the United States of the era, aggravated by high unemployment among blacks, de facto segregation in housing, and the failure to enforce civil rights laws. This contributed to the New York City teachers' strike of 1968, when Brownsville's majority white teacher population clashed with the majority black residential population. Conversely, the mostly white population of Canarsie protested efforts at racial school integration in the early 1970s, which largely led to white flight in Canarsie by the 1980s.

=== Manhattan ===
Starting in the mid-19th century, the United States became a magnet for immigrants seeking to escape poverty in their home countries. After arriving in New York, many new immigrants ended up living in squalor in the slums of the Five Points neighborhood. By the 1820s, the area was home to many gambling dens and brothels, and was known as a dangerous place to go. In 1842, Charles Dickens visited the area and was appalled by the horrendous living conditions he saw there. The area was so notorious that it even caught the attention of Abraham Lincoln, who visited there in 1860 before his Cooper Union speech. The predominantly Irish Five Points Gang was one of the country's first major organized crime entities.

As Italian immigration grew in the early 20th century, many joined ethnic gangs. A prominent example is Al Capone, who got his start in crime with the Five Points Gang. The Mafia (also known as Cosa Nostra) first developed in the mid-19th century in Sicily, and spread to the East Coast of the United States during the late 19th century, following waves of Sicilian and Southern Italian emigration. Lucky Luciano established Cosa Nostra in Manhattan, and formed alliances with other criminal enterprises. This included the Jewish mob, which was led by Meyer Lansky, who was the leading Jewish gangster of that period. From 1920 to 1933, U. S. Prohibition helped create a thriving black market in liquor, which the Mafia was quick to capitalize on.

The borough experienced a sharp increase in crime during the post-war period. The murder rate in Manhattan hit an all-time high of 42 murders per 100,000 residents in 1979. Manhattan retained the highest murder rate in the city until 1985 when it was surpassed by the Bronx. Most serious violent crime has been historically concentrated in Upper Manhattan and the Lower East Side, though robbery in particular was a major quality-of-life concern throughout the borough. Through the 1990s and 2000s, crime in Manhattan plummeted in all categories versus historic highs.

Today crime rates in most of Lower Manhattan, Midtown, the Upper East Side, and the Upper West Side are consistent with other major city centers in the United States. However, crime rates remain high in the Upper Manhattan neighborhoods of East Harlem, Harlem, Washington Heights, Inwood, and NYCHA developments across the borough despite significant reductions. In more recent years there has been an increase in violent crime, particularly in Upper Manhattan and NYCHA developments.

==== Harlem ====
Harlem, a large neighborhood within the northern section of the New York City borough of Manhattan, has historically had some of the highest rates of poverty and violent crime citywide. Although the rate of crime has decreased compared to historic highs of the early 1990s, high rates of crime are still prevalent in the neighborhood. Crime in Harlem is primarily related to illicit activities such as theft, robbery, drug trafficking and prostitution. Criminal organizations such as street gangs are responsible for a significant portion of crime, particularly violent crime. The leading cause of death among young black males in Harlem is homicide. According to a survey published in 2013 by Union Settlement Association, residents of East Harlem perceive crime as their biggest single concern. Harlem today maintains one of the highest violent crime rates in New York City. In 2021, the 25th Precinct had the second-highest rates of felony assault and robbery, the sixteenth-highest rate of rape, and the highest rate of murder out of the New York Police Department's 77 precincts.

==== Chinatown ====
The early days of Chinatown were dominated by Chinese "tongs" (now sometimes referred to as "associations")—a mix of clan associations, landsman's associations, political alliances (Kuomintang vs. Chinese Communist Party), and (more secretly) crime syndicates. The associations started to give protection from harassment due to anti-Chinese sentiment. Each of these associations was aligned with a street gang. The associations were a source of assistance to new immigrants, doing things such as giving out loans and helping to start businesses.

Until the 1980s, the portion of Chinatown east of the Bowery, considered part of the Lower East Side, had a higher proportion of non-Chinese residents than in Chinatown's western section. During the 1970s and 1980s, this area had deteriorating building conditions, including vacant lots and storefronts, with fewer businesses. It suffered from many violent crimes such as gang activities, robberies, burglaries and rape, as well as racial tensions with other ethnic groups. Female Chinese garment workers were especially targets of robbery and rape, with many leaving work together in groups to protect each other as they were heading home.

Similarly, crime in Chinatown increased due to the poor relations between Cantonese and Fuzhouese immigrants when the latter group started moving into the area in the 1980s and 1990s. Due to the Fuzhou immigrants having no legal status and an inability to speak Cantonese, many were denied jobs in Chinatown, and instead became criminals to make a living. There was a large amount of Cantonese resentment against Fuzhou immigrants arriving into Chinatown.

During the mid-to-late 1980s, Chinatown began to experience an influx of Vietnamese refugees from the Vietnam War. Since most of the Vietnamese could not speak Mandarin or Cantonese, which was solely used for most social services, they struggled to survive and lived on the fringes of the community. Eventually, many Vietnamese youth within the city started to form gang factions. Under the leadership of a wealthy Vietnamese immigrant named David Thai, who combined many separate gangs into one known as Born to Kill, Vietnamese youths began a violent crime spree in Chinatown – robbing, extorting, and racketeering – drawing much resentment from the Chinese community.

==== Washington Heights and Inwood ====
Washington Heights and Inwood, neighborhoods in Upper Manhattan, recorded a total of 103 murders in 1990. The crack epidemic of the late 1980s and early 1990s impacted the community especially hard. The 33rd precinct was established in the area in 1993. The violent crime rate remains higher than the city as a whole today despite a significant decline compared to the crack epidemic. Drug trafficking and human trafficking continue to be a major quality of life issues in the community.

=== Subway crime ===
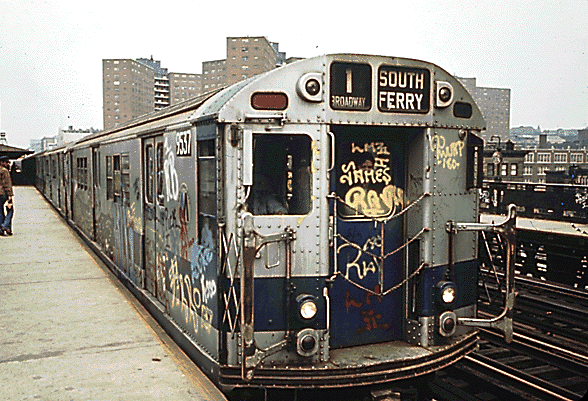
A New York City 1 service subway car in 1973

The New York City Subway is a rapid transit system that serves four of the five boroughs of New York City, New York: the Bronx, Brooklyn, Manhattan, and Queens. Its operator is the New York City Transit Authority (NYCTA), which is controlled by the Metropolitan Transportation Authority (MTA) of New York. Since the Federal Transit Administration has kept national ridership data, it has been the busiest mass transit system for any mode and any city in the United States.

Crime on the New York City Subway reached a peak in the late 1970s and early 1980s, with the city's subway having a crime rate higher than that of any other mass transit system in the world. During the 2000s, the subway had a lower crime rate, as crime started dropping in the 1990s.

==== Escalation ====
In the 1960s, mayor Robert Wagner ordered an increase in the Transit Police force from 1,219 to 3,100 officers. During the hours at which crimes most frequently occurred (between 8:00 p.m. and 4:00 a.m.), the officers went on patrol in all stations and trains. In response, crime rates decreased, as extensively reported by the press.

However, as a consequence of the city's 1976 fiscal crisis, service had become poor and crime had gone up, with crime being announced on the subway almost every day. Additionally, there were 11 "crimes against the infrastructure" in open cut areas of the subway in 1977, where TA staff were injured, some seriously. There were other rampant crimes as well. For example, in the first two weeks of December 1977, "Operation Subway Sweep" resulted in the arrest of over 200 robbery suspects. Passengers were afraid of crime, fed up with long waits for trains that were shortened to save money and upset over the general malfunctioning of the system. The subway also had many dark subway cars. Further compounding the issue, on July 13, 1977, a blackout cut off electricity to most of the city and to Westchester.

Due to a sudden increase in violent crimes on the subway in the last week of 1978, police statistics about crime in the subway were being questioned. In 1979, six murders on the subway occurred in the first two months of the year, compared to nine during the entire previous year. The IRT Lexington Avenue Line was known to be frequented by muggers, so in February 1979, a group headed by Curtis Sliwa began unarmed patrols of the 4 train during the night time, in an effort to discourage crime. They were known as the Guardian Angels, and would eventually expand their operations into other parts of the five boroughs. By February 1980, the Guardian Angels' ranks numbered 220.

On the IRT Pelham Line in 1980, a sharp rise in window-smashing on subway cars caused $2 million in damages; it spread to other lines during the course of the year. When the broken windows were discovered in trains that were still in service, they needed to be taken out of service, causing additional delays; in August 1980 alone, 775 vandalism-related delays were reported. Vandalism of subway cars, including windows, continued through the mid-1980s; between January 27 and February 2, 1985, 1,129 pieces of glass were replaced on subway cars on the 1, 6, CC, E, and K trains.

On January 20, 1982, MTA Chairman Richard Ravitch told the business group Association for a Better New York that he would not let his teenage sons ride the subway at night, and that even he, as the subway chairman, was nervous riding the trains. The MTA began to discuss how the ridership issue could be fixed, but by October 1982, mostly due to fears about transit crime, poor subway performance, and some economic factors, ridership on the subway was at extremely low levels matching 1917 ridership. Within less than ten years, the MTA had lost around 300 million passengers, mainly because of fears of crime. In July 1985, the Citizens Crime Commission of New York City published a study showing this trend, fearing the frequent robberies and generally bad circumstances.

==== Transit Police shakeup and turnaround ====
In March 1979, Mayor Ed Koch asked the city's top law enforcement officials to devise a plan to counteract rising subway violence and to stop insisting that the subways were safer than the streets. Two weeks after Koch's request, top TA cops were publicly requesting Transit Police Chief Sanford Garelik's resignation because they claimed that he had lost control of the fight against subway crime. Finally, on September 11, 1979, Garelik was fired, and replaced with Deputy Chief of Personnel James B. Meehan, reporting directly to City Police Commissioner Robert J. McGuire. Garelik continued in his role of chief of security for the MTA.

By September 1979, around 250 felonies per week (or about 13,000 that year) were being recorded on the subway, making the crime rate the most of any other mass transit network anywhere in the world. Some police officers supposedly could not act upon the quality of life crimes and were only to look for violent crimes.

Among other problems the following were included:

Transit police radios and the New York City Police radios transmitted at different frequencies, and if additional help above ground was needed, it could not be summoned because no one above ground would hear the request. Subway patrols were also rigidly scheduled, and it wasn't long before felons (and even the general riders) knew exactly when police would be on their train, or at particular stations. The public perception at the time was that the war on subway crime was failing. In October of 1979, additional decoy and undercover units were deployed in the subway.

Meehan had claimed to be able to, along with 2,300 police officers, "provide sufficient protection to straphangers" with felonies per day dropped from 261 to 154. However, overall crime grew by 70% between 1979 and 1980.

The MTA began a five-year program to eradicate graffiti from subway trains in 1984. In 1989, the Metropolitan Transportation Authority asked the Transit Police (then located within the NYCTA) to focus on minor offenses such as fare evasion. In the early nineties, the NYCTA adopted similar policing methods for Penn Station and Grand Central Terminal. When in 1993, Mayor Rudy Giuliani and Police Commissioner Howard Safir were elected to official positions, the Broken Windows strategy was more widely deployed in New York under the rubrics of "zero tolerance" and "quality of life". Crime rates in the subway and city dropped, prompting New York magazine to declare "The End of Crime as We Know It" on the cover of its edition of August 14, 1995. Giuliani's campaign credited the success to the zero-tolerance policy. The extent to which his policies deserve the credit is disputed. Incoming New York City Police Department Commissioner William J. Bratton and author of Fixing Broken Windows, George L. Kelling, however, stated the police played an "important, even central, role" in the declining crime rates.

Trends continued and Giuliani's successor, Michael Bloomberg, stated in a November 2004 press release that "Today, the subway system is safer than it has been at any time since we started tabulating subway crime statistics nearly 40 years ago."

==== Shoves, falls, and track intrusions ====
A legacy transit system constructed with unique combinations of rolling stock, stations and right-of-way, the New York City subway lacks platform screen doors adopted in similar systems built later in the 20th century. Incidents in which victims have been shoved into the path of subways have received national attention. In 1999, one such shoving incident (involving a schizophrenic perpetrator in a state of psychosis) led New York State to adopt Kendra's Law, allowing courts to impose outpatient treatment. Rail suicides are also a longstanding phenomenon of the New York City subways.

The MTA Chair and CEO Janno Lieber stated that are also looking into "making changes to subway platforms", and that "these (shoving) incidents are unacceptable and have to stop." In 2022, the MTA announced that it will be trialing platform doors at three subway stations. Stopgap measures adopted to mitigate the problem have included metal barriers that have been installed in 158 stations as of June 2026.

Fatalities in New York City Subway collisions (2021-2025)
	2021	2022	2023	2024	2025
Suicide	29	29	33	34	18
Other	40	54	67	67	72
Total	69	83	100	101	90

== Policing tactics ==
=== Broken windows theory ===
The broken windows theory is a criminological theory of the norm-setting and signalling effect of urban disorder and vandalism on additional crime and anti-social behavior. The theory states that maintaining and monitoring urban environments in a well-ordered condition may stop further vandalism and escalation into more serious crime.

=== CompStat ===
CompStat is the name given to the New York City Police Department's accountability process and has since been replicated in many other departments. CompStat is a management philosophy or organizational management tool for police departments, roughly equivalent to Six Sigma or TQM, and was not a computer system or software package in its original form. Through an evolutionary process, however, some commercial entities have created turnkey packages including computer systems, software, mobile devices, and other implements collectively assembled under the heading of CompStat. Instead, CompStat is a multilayered dynamic approach to crime reduction, quality of life improvement, and personnel and resource management. CompStat employs Geographic Information Systems and was intended to map crime and identify problems. In weekly meetings, ranking NYPD executives meet with local precinct commanders from one of the eight patrol boroughs in New York City to discuss the problems. They devise strategies and tactics to solve problems, reduce crime, and ultimately improve quality of life in their assigned area.

=== Policing ===
Law enforcement in New York City is carried out by numerous law enforcement agencies. New York City has the highest concentration of law enforcement agencies in the United States. As with the rest of the US, agencies operate at federal, state, and local (county and city) levels. However, New York City's unique nature means many more operate at lower levels. Many private police forces also operate in New York City. The New York City Police Department is the main police agency in the city.

=== Stop-and-frisk ===
The NYPD has come under scrutiny for its use of stop-and-frisk, implemented under Rudy Giuliani's tenure as mayor.

It is a practice of the New York City Police Department by which police officers stop and question hundreds of thousands of pedestrians annually, and frisk them for weapons and other contraband. The rules for stop, question and frisk are found in New York State Criminal Procedure Law section 140.50, and are based on the decision of the United States Supreme Court in the case of Terry v. Ohio. About 684,000 people were stopped in 2011. The vast majority of these people were black or Hispanic. Some judges have found that these stops are not based on reasonable suspicion of criminal activity.

On October 31, 2013, the United States Court of Appeals for the Second Circuit blocked the order requiring changes to the New York Police Department's stop-and-frisk program and removed Judge Shira Scheindlin from the case. On November 9, 2013, the city asked a federal appeals court to vacate Scheindlin's orders. Bill de Blasio, who succeeded Bloomberg as mayor in 2014, has pledged to reform the stop-and-frisk program, and is calling for new leadership at the NYPD, an inspector general, and a strong racial profiling bill.

== See also ==
- Crime in New York (state)
- List of United States cities by crime rate
- Timeline of New York City
