= Amy Watkins =

American murder victim

Amy Watkins (1972–1999) was a social worker from Topeka, Kansas, who was murdered while walking down the street on March 8, 1999, in Brooklyn, New York. Her death sparked widespread dismay in New York City, where the murder rate had been steadily dropping since 1990, and days later 300 marchers expressed their grief with a candlelight march on her Prospect Heights street. Mayor Rudy Giuliani attended her wake.

Watkins graduated from the University of Kansas in 1996, and was a student at the Hunter College School of Social Work at the time of her death. Both institutions established scholarships in her name. The New York City chapter of the National Association of Social Workers also renamed a scholarship in her honor.

== Investigation ==
The NYPD was unable to make an arrest in the Watkins case for over a year, until August 2000, when one of the assailants boasted of the crime. Two men were ultimately convicted in 2001, David Jamison and Felix Rodriguez, and both received lengthy prison sentences. The case also made headlines because, during the course of the trial, Amy's father Lawrence Watkins, a teacher at Dominican Academy and at New York University, and his wife Gayle Greene Watkins, established a close relationship with the mother of the main perpetrator, Jamison.

== See also ==
- Timeline of New York City crimes and disasters
