= Murder of Nathaniel Levi Gaines =

American murder victim

Nathaniel Levi Gaines
- Born: 1971
- Died: July 4, 1996 (aged 24–25); New York City
- Occupation: Highway toll taker

Nathaniel Levi Gaines (1971 – July 4, 1996) was an African-American resident of Yonkers, New York who was fatally shot by a New York City Transit Police officer (a division of the New York City Police Department). The officer, Paolo Colecchia, was convicted of second-degree manslaughter—only the third successful homicide prosecution of a police officer in the city since 1977.

Gaines was a veteran of service in the Persian Gulf War, and had no criminal record, nor any history of encounters with police or law enforcement agencies.

== Shooting ==
The July 4, 1996 altercation between Gaines and police officer Paolo Colecchia, which resulted in Gaines' death, occurred on the 167th Street subway station platform of the "D" line in the Bronx. Colecchia reported after the incident that there had been a struggle between himself and Gaines in the subway station, claiming that Gaines had tried to grab his gun and push him onto the railway track. However, it became clear that the officer knew during the struggle that Gaines was not in possession of any weapon.

== Controversy ==
Due to the nature of the crime, and the fact that the officer was white and the victim black, the story caused large scale disruption and controversy across New York. As well as racial discord, there was also controversy over the actions of police officers and their conduct and the increasing number of officers accused of using excessive force.

== Criminal charges ==
Colecchia, who had a history of civilian complaints made against him to the NYPD, was sentenced to 1.5 to 4.5 years in prison for second degree manslaughter, the city's third police officer to be sentenced for committing the crime while on active duty.

== See also ==
- List of unarmed African Americans killed by law enforcement officers in the United States
- List of killings by law enforcement officers in the United States
