= Harvey Marcelin =

American serial killer

- Born: Harvey A. Marcelin; May 21, 1938 (age 88); Harlem, New York City, New York, U.S.
- Other name: Marceline Harvey
- Status: Incarcerated
- Convictions: Bonds: Murder; Miranda: Manslaughter; Leyden: Murder
- Penalty: Bonds: Life imprisonment with parole Miranda: 12 years imprisonment Leyden: Life imprisonment without parole

Details
- Victims: 3
- Span of crimes: 1963–2022
- Country: United States
- State: New York
- Date apprehended: For the final time in April 2022

Harvey A. Marcelin (born May 21, 1938) is an American serial killer of women.

Marcelin has been convicted of killing three women, including two former girlfriends, in 1963 and 1986; his most recent conviction was in May 2026.

Marcelin came out as transgender and began transitioning to a woman in 1993. However, in early 2026, he began re-identifying as a man.

== Early life ==
Harvey A. Marcelin was born May 21, 1938, in Harlem, New York City, the only child of a shipping clerk and a seamstress who later moved to Washington Heights. According to later interviews, Marcelin was spoiled by both of his parents and grew up in a relatively stable environment.

When he was ten, his father died, after which Marcelin had to be brought up by his mother. He attended kindergarten and later a Catholic school run by the St. Aloysius Catholic Church in Harlem where, according to Marcelin, he was sexually abused, whipped and forced to eat expired food by the nuns. As a result, he experienced many emotional and behavioral problems, and by his teenage years, he had begun to engage in sexually deviant behavior.

By his own admission, Marcelin first began cross-dressing in 1951 after attending a Halloween party, after which he reportedly began suffering from gender dysphoria and had sex with a man for the first time. Around this time, his mental health began to decline rapidly, with the then-14-year-old being accused of attempting to sexually assault an 8-year-old girl in 1952. Not long after, he was admitted to a psychiatric hospital in the summer of that year for evaluation on behalf of Catholic Charities USA. The medical reports noted that at that time, Marcelin was a noted truant who committed thefts and regularly engaged in sexual activity with men and women alike. Upon his release, Marcelin returned to school and graduated in 1956, but soon returned to his criminal lifestyle.

=== Hospitalization ===
In 1957, he was charged with a burglary, convicted and spent several months in the county jail. After being released, Marcelin spent the period from the late 1950s to 1963 living with his mother and working as a copy machine operator, as he had difficulty finding a stable source of income due to his mental illness and drug addiction. Despite his repeated internments, psychiatrists could never reach a consensus on what exactly he suffered from.

On April 9, 1962, Marcelin voluntarily sought treatment at the Bellevue Hospital, where he remained until April 16, whereupon he was discharged to his wife's custody. Tests conducted during this time established that he showed signs of chronic schizophrenia, delusions and a paranoid personality.

== Murder of Jacqueline Bonds ==
=== Marriage and affairs ===
In the early 1960s, Marcelin married a woman named Florence Jackson, but their relationship proved troublesome, as Marcelin often cheated on Florence with other women. In early 1962, Marcelin met 24-year-old Jacqueline Bonds, with whom he soon began an intimate relationship. However, Bonds soon began to accuse him of being aggressive and eventually ended their affair – this caused Marcelin to start stalking and sexually harassing her, as well as threaten to "get her" in front of Bonds's mother.

In March 1963, Marcelin, along with his newest girlfriend, Clementine Benifield, were arrested in Brooklyn on charges of attempted rape, second-degree assault and burglary. After his arrest, he claimed that Bonds was with them at the time of the crimes, and Bonds was promptly detained, but when it later became clear that she played a small role, the prosecutors offered her a plea deal - in exchange for testifying against her co-defendants, she would be granted immunity from prosecution. While the investigation was still underway, Marcelin was released from prison after his mother paid his bail.

On April 18, Marcelin went to Bonds' apartment on 2216 Eighth Avenue in Manhattan and got into an argument with her in the hallway, during which Marcelin pulled out a .32 caliber revolver and shot her. Bonds then ran into her bedroom, but was shot again twice, staggering and collapsing into the living room, where she succumbed to her injuries. Marcelin was arrested shortly afterwards and taken to the Bellevue Hospital for a psychiatric assessment. The examining psychiatrists ruled that while he suffered from a schizoid personality disorder with sociopathic traits, Marcelin was sane and could stand trial.

=== First trial and incarceration ===
At trial, Marcelin was found guilty of first-degree murder of Bonds on November 18, 1963, and was sentenced to a life term with a chance of parole after a jury deadlocked on the death penalty. When asked why he did it, he claimed that he killed Bonds out of jealousy, since Bonds was beautiful and popular and Marcelin did not want her to be with other men.

After his conviction, Marcelin was transferred between the various prison facilities across New York. In 1971, he participated in the Attica Prison riot, which would later become one of the most famous and significant events of the prisoners' rights movement by bringing more attention to their demands for political rights and better living conditions. The riot caused a public outcry across the nation and attracted media attention after it was violently suppressed by the police. After the riot ended, a number of inmates were transferred to other prisons, including Marcelin. In November of that year, he was interviewed by reporters and described what had happened, stating that the rioters had been bullied by prison staff at the facilities they were transferred to.

For many years, his parole applications were repeatedly denied due to his aggressive behavior towards women and sending inappropriate letters to hospital volunteers. In May 1984, after serving more than 21 years in prison, Marcelin was granted parole with lifetime supervision and released.

== Killing of Anna Serrera ==
=== 1980s post-release life ===
After his release, Marcelin returned to New York City, where he found lodging in a room at the Cambridge Residence Hotel in Harlem. Due to financial difficulties, he had trouble finding employment after his release and earned a living by renting out his hotel room. He also spent a great amount of time amongst prostitutes and pimps, as well as homeless people who struggled from various forms of alcoholism and drug addictions.

In early 1985, he met 29-year-old Anna Laura Serrera Miranda, a heroin addict and prostitute who soon became his lodger and roommate. On October 29, Marcelin, who had recently ingested crack cocaine, stabbed Miranda to death during an argument, after which he dismembered the corpse, put it into black plastic garbage bags and then scattered them around various areas of Central Park. He was quickly arrested after the remains were discovered, as his neighbor Roberto Romano had seen him when he was carrying blood-soaked bags the day after the murder.

=== Second trial and incarceration ===
During interrogations, Marcelin fully admitted to killing Miranda, but insisted he had done so in self-defense. According to Marcelin, they had gotten into an argument because Miranda stopped paying her rent and stole several items from the hotel room, including a flute and cufflinks. He claimed that he was never aggressive with Miranda and cared for her, while she often left for days at a time without explanation. An autopsy concluded that Miranda had been stabbed a total of 33 times.

Because he had committed a felony, Marcelin's parole was revoked and he was returned to prison to continue serving his life term. In 1986, he was convicted of killing Miranda, but the charges were downgraded to manslaughter following a guilty plea, adding only 12 years to his existing life term. He was allowed to apply for parole, and as a result, from 1985 to 2019, he applied for parole a total of 15 times, but was always denied due to the severity of his crimes. Some of the arguments for his parole ranged from asking for a new trial to getting involved in a class action lawsuit for his involvement in the Attica prison riot, as well as labeling an all-female parole board "sexist" for denying him parole.

In 1993, while incarcerated at the Auburn Correctional Facility, Marcelin met with a transsexual inmate who advised him to start taking the hormone therapy medication Premarin, after which Marcelin completely dedicated himself to transitioning to female. In 2019, he was finally granted parole by the Parole Board after they took into account his advanced age; successful completion of multiple rehabilitation programs; graduate degree in computer science and technology; and letters from various volunteer organizations that pledged to provide him with housing and employment if released.

Marcelin was thus granted parole a second time on August 7, 2019, at the age of 81, having spent nearly 55 years incarcerated since the murder of Jacqueline Bonds.

== Murder of Susan Leyden ==
=== 2010s post-release life ===
After his release, the 81-year-old Marcelin returned to New York City, now presenting as a transgender woman and going under the name Marceline Harvey. In late 2019, while visiting the Tompkins Square Park in East Village, he met Susan Leyden, a 68-year-old lesbian living in a Fort Greene-based homeless shelter for LGBT people. At the time she met Marcelin, Leyden suffered from an undisclosed mental illness and was addicted to drugs, but was formerly a successful entrepreneur who owned a jewelry store in Fort Lee, New Jersey, which she had to abandon in the late 2010s due to her declining mental health.

Soon after they became acquainted with one another, they started living at the shelter and developed romantic feelings for one another. A few months later, Marcelin and Leyden found housing in Manhattan. Despite his advanced age and long imprisonment, Marcelin was able to quickly adapt to social life and to the Internet, establishing accounts on social networks such as Facebook. He also began to live an active social life, spending much of his free time outdoors, trying to get to know women and having intimate relationships. On his social media accounts, Marcelin posted pictures of herself with makeup and various female wigs. At around this time, two other women became close friends with his and often came to the apartment he shared with Leyden.

=== Discovery and arrest ===
In late February 2022, Marcelin stabbed Leyden to death and later dismembered her corpse, parts of which were subsequently scattered around various blocks in New York City. Leyden's torso was found wrapped in a multicolored bag with a flower decal by a passer-by in a shopping cart several blocks away from the apartment on March 3, prompting police to question him about the gruesome discovery.

On the following day, Marcelin was arrested at the apartment following a police search which uncovered Leyden's severed head, a power saw, and bloody sheets. Police also reviewed surveillance footage that covered the entryway of the apartment building where Leyden and Marcelin lived, with the footage showing that Leyden was last seen alive entering the building on February 27. In the following days, only Marcelin was seen on the footage, and until his arrest, he was seen traveling with a purse that belonged to Leyden. In addition to this, surveillance footage from a local hardware store taken on March 1 showed him purchasing a reciprocal saw; the next day, footage from a grocery store showed Marcelin riding a mobility scooter with what appeared to be a severed human leg on the seat.

=== Charges and theories about motive ===
On March 30, 2022, Marcelin was charged with second-degree murder and concealment of a corpse, to which he pleaded not guilty. Police have thus far been unable to establish a motive for the murder. An examination of Marcelin's social media accounts revealed that he initially established contact with Leyden in 2019, and throughout 2020 and 2021, he repeatedly used Leyden's photos as his social media profile picture. In October 2021, just months before Leyden's murder, Marcelin responded to a comment made by Leyden by simply saying "Love personified". Police speculate that the feelings were not mutual and that Leyden was actually afraid of Marcelin and wanted to end their relationship, which in turn could have further motivated the murder. In November 2020, Marcelin uploaded a photo of a young blonde woman as his Facebook profile's main picture - in response, Leyden posted a negative comment, calling him a "freak".

=== Marcelin's version of events ===
After his arrest, Marcelin was interviewed in Rikers Island by a reporter for The New York Post, during which he gave details of his biography and his version of events. In the interview, he admitted responsibility for the murders of Bonds and Miranda, but categorically denied killing Leyden, instead blaming one of the female acquaintances who frequented the apartment.

Marcelin also said that he has a split personality, with one identity periodically replacing the other. He described the female identity, Marceline Harvey, as a peaceful, caring lesbian, while the male one - Harvey Marcelin - was a "bad guy" who was misogynistic, a deviant and very aggressive. A number of acquaintances of Marcelin who were interviewed at a later date expressed disgust and disbelief in regards to the crime committed, with a friend of Leyden's saying that whoever the killer was, they deserved either life without parole or the death penalty.

=== Third trial and conviction ===
Marcelin's trial for the murder of Susan Leyden began on April 20, 2026. It ended in May 2026, after Marcelin began identifying as male again, and with another conviction for murder. On June 10, 2026, Marcelin was sentenced to life imprisonment without the possibility of parole.
