= Caroline Rose Isenberg =

American actress

Caroline Rose Isenberg (October 27, 1961 - December 2, 1984) was an American actress and Harvard College graduate whose 1984 murder on a Manhattan rooftop gathered wide national media coverage in the United States.

== Early life ==
Isenberg was born October 27, 1961, in Brookline, Massachusetts. She attended the Brimmer and May School and was an undergraduate at Harvard College where she lived in Currier House. During her senior year she was chosen to act in First Affair, a made-for-TV movie set and filmed at Harvard. Although numerous other undergraduates were included as extras, she was the only student who had a speaking part.

After graduation, she moved to Manhattan and took an apartment at 929 West End Avenue on the Upper West Side, with her best friend Sea Glassman. Isenberg began to take drama classes at Neighborhood Playhouse School of the Theatre.

== Murder ==
In the early hours of December 2, 1984, after returning from a Broadway show, she was attacked, dragged to the roof of her apartment building and stabbed. Her calls for help were quite specific and made reference to her name and apartment number, something that in classes on women's safety she had learned could increase the chance that others would intervene to help. This in fact succeeded in getting neighbors to summon the police. She was taken to the hospital where she managed to give the police a statement on her attacker, but died early that morning. Several days later, nearly one thousand people attended her funeral in Brookline, Massachusetts and her burial in Wakefield, Massachusetts.

Emmanuel Torres, the son of the building custodian, was arrested on December 29, 1984, and was convicted of her murder in 1985. The case attracted detailed national coverage for a number of reasons: it highlighted the dangers of 1980s New York City and also showed how violent crime robbed a talented young person of a bright future. There was some controversy that the murder of a white woman received so much more coverage than did the hundreds of killings of non-white women each year. The racial politics of the case were further complicated when it was revealed that the killer's brother, Alfredo Torres, was a physician in residence. Much of the coverage took up the question of how two brothers could have such divergent life histories.

At Emmanuel Torres' August 1985 sentencing, Justice Stephen G. Crane remarked that the case was of "Shakespearean proportions in its foul and tragic dimensions." Crane told Torres, "To this day, you have never expressed regret at the murder of this beautiful human being. All you have ever done is boast about it to police, to television reporters and to fellow inmates."

Torres was sentenced to life imprisonment.

== Legacy ==
The rock band The Alarm released a song entitled Caroline Isenberg on a 1986 EP that tells the story of her death as does "Suite 929" by Brian Gari on his CD "Songs For Future Musicals."

"Night Prayer," a poem by Seattle-based author Stacey Levine, appeared in the May 1985 issue of the political/activist journal Northwest Passage. The poem reflects on Caroline Isenberg's death.

=== Scholarships ===
A number of scholarships have been established to commemorate Isenberg, including one at her secondary school and one at Harvard.

- Caroline R. Isenberg Scholarship Fund is given at the Brimmer and May School to an Upper School student who shows promise in art .
- Caroline Isenberg Traveling Fellowship, Harvard University

== Filmography ==
- First Affair (1983)
