= 2022 Northeastern U.S. serial shooter =

Serial shooter targeting homeless men in the northeastern U.S.

Details
- Victims: 2 killed, 3 wounded
- Span of crimes: March 3 – March 12, 2022
- Country: United States
- States: Washington, D.C., New York
- Date apprehended: One suspect arrested

In March of 2022, a man shot five homeless men in Washington, D.C., and New York City, wounding three and killing two. Shortly before midnight on March 13, 2022, the New York and District of Columbia police departments announced that they believed a single person was responsible for the attacks. The fatal shooting in New York City, caught on tape, shows a man inspecting a homeless man sleeping on a sidewalk cornering a building, then pointing a .22-caliber handgun towards the man's upper body and opening fire.

On March 15, Gerald Brevard, a 30-year-old resident of Washington, D.C., was arrested in connection with the attacks. On October 26, 2026, he was found guilty of a bias-related hate crime in federal court for the attacks in Washington.

== Attacks ==
One man was shot on March 3, 2022, at around 4:00 a.m. and another was shot on March 8 around 1:20 a.m., with both attacks occurring in Northeast Washington, D.C., and the injuries described as non-life-threatening. On March 9, an officer responding to a tent fire discovered a man dead inside due to multiple gunshot and stab wounds. The man was later identified as 54-year-old Morgan Holmes.

On March 12, a man was shot in the arm in New York City while asleep at about 4:30 a.m., the victim woke up and screamed at the man, "What are you doing?" before the shooter fled the scene. Later, another man was found dead with gunshot wounds to his head and neck, with video footage of the attack showing the attacker approaching the victim and kicking him several times before opening fire. Witnesses reported gunfire around 6:00 a.m. The victim was identified as Gambian native Abdoulaye Coulibaly.

== Investigation ==
Police initially connected the killings after a Metropolitan Police Captain from Queens recognized the man's photo from an investigation in Washington. Federal investigators from the ATF compared the .22-caliber shell casings and confirmed they were similar.

Both New York City Mayor Eric Adams and Washington, D.C. Mayor Muriel Bowser announced that they were coordinating with federal authorities to fully investigate the crimes. The New York City Police Department (NYPD) and Washington's Metropolitan Police Department (MPD) announced on March 13 that they were opening a joint investigation into the shootings, along with the Bureau of Alcohol, Tobacco, Firearms and Explosives (ATF). Authorities offered a number of rewards for information resulting in an arrest: MPD offered a reward of $25,000, NYPD offered a reward of $10,000, and the ATF Washington Field Division offered $20,000.

Police in Washington, D.C., released a video of the suspected perpetrator and passed out flyers around the area of the shootings. Mayor Bowser announced to reporters that the shootings were connected, due to ballistic evidence.

On March 15, ATF investigators in Washington, D.C., arrested a 30-year-old male suspect in connection with the shootings. Police said they had earlier received a tip from someone who recognized the suspect.

== Response ==
Adams and Bowser released a joint statement calling the shootings "heartbreaking and tragic" and the perpetrator a "cold-blooded killer." NYPD Police Commissioner Keechant Sewell noted the vulnerability of the homeless population and that the police would use any tool and method available to arrest the perpetrator.

Adams announced a task force to help identify homeless individuals in subways and other locations and provide information and safe locations at city shelters. However, many of the homeless population refused to enter shelters, claiming that the shelters offered were unsafe and unsanitary due to a lack of resources provided for upkeep and other homeless individuals.
