= Death of Anthony Baez =

1994 death of a man in New York police custody

Anthony Ramon Baez (September 20, 1965 – December 22, 1994) was a security guard who died immediately following an altercation with police on December 22, 1994, at the age of 29. His death occurred early in the morning on CamPlace in the Mount Hope section of the Bronx, New York. The fatal encounter began when Anthony Baez and his brothers accidentally hit a police car with their football, at approximately 1:30 am. The Baez brothers continued their game, playing in the opposite direction. Officer Francis Livoti arrested David Baez first for disorderly conduct. He then attempted to arrest Anthony Baez, who had protested his brother's arrest by crossing his arms in front of his chest. A scuffle ensued, while other officers arrived on scene. Baez was subdued, lost consciousness, and was taken to a hospital, where he was declared dead of asphyxiation. Controversy centered over the extent to which officers contributed to his death, specifically whether he was subjected to an unauthorized choke hold by Officer Francis Livoti.

== Personal details ==
Anthony Baez was 6 feet 6 inches tall, 270 pounds, and asthmatic. Mr. Baez had allegedly resisted arrest and police claimed it took four officers to handcuff him and bring him to the ground. Baez was taken to the hospital by the police when a dispatched ambulance by Sgt. William Monahan, failed to arrive. The New York City Medical Examiner ruled that Anthony Baez' death was caused by asphyxiation due to "compression of his neck and chest", as well as acute asthma. Dr. Hirsch said that the classification of homicide indicated the death was caused "either entirely or partially" by "the actions of another person".

Phil Caruso, the president of the Patrolmen's Benevolent Association, said that Anthony Baez “resisted violently when they attempted to put handcuffs on him, that's when he had the asthmatic attack." Sgt. William Monahan later testified that after the struggle, he saw Mr. Baez, handcuffed, stand up and walk briefly, with assistance from Officer Francis Livoti, contradicting claims by Baez's family that he was already limp when cuffed.

Livoti was the subject of several civilian complaints for excessive force, though none had been substantiated by the Civilian Complaint Review Board.

== Criminal trials and investigations ==
In March 1995, a Bronx grand jury indicted Livoti on charges of manslaughter in the second degree. Homicide charges were initially thrown out after an indictment with an incorrect charge was noted.

In December 1995, Livoti was reindicted for criminally negligent homicide. Livoti's trial began in September 1996. He had waived his right to a jury trial and instead opted to have the case heard solely by a judge. In October 1996, Officer Francis Livoti was acquitted by former New York Supreme Court justice Judge Jerry Sheindlin. The acquittal was greeted with widespread public outcry and unrest, including the shooting of a police captain (who survived) in an act of "revenge".

Federal prosecutors charged Livoti with civil rights violations, similar to cases brought against Los Angeles police officers Stacey C. Koon and Laurence Powell for the beating of Rodney King. Officer Daisy Boria was considered a distant relative of the Baezes and was present at his arrest in 1994. She contradicted three of her fellow police officers, including her partner. Boria had testified that she saw no confrontation between Livoti and Baez. However, in 1987, she had been indicted on perjury charges by the Manhattan District Attorney for lying about an insurance case. She was later acquitted. In 2003, disciplinary charges were brought against two other officers, Mario Erotokritou and Anthony Farnan, involved in the death of Anthony Baez. Both officers were summarily dismissed.

In his defense, Livoti denied that he had used a choke hold, asserting that any choking was unintentional and that he had not caused Baez's injuries or death. Three officers at the scene testified that they did not see anyone put Baez in a choke hold, that Baez was resisting arrest when Livoti handcuffed him, and that Baez was conscious after being restrained. Baez' father and brothers testified that Livoti did put Baez in a choke hold, and that Baez was limp when Livoti handcuffed him. Officer Francis Livoti also contended that the district court failed to consider that Baez at least contributed to the confrontation by resisting his (Livoti's) efforts to handcuff him (Baez) behind his back. Prosecutors countered that there was no probable cause for the arrest in the first place, it not being a crime to accidentally hit a police car with a football.

== Conclusion ==
On June 26, 1998, Livoti was convicted in Manhattan's Federal Court of violating Anthony Baez's civil rights, and was sentenced to seven and a half years in federal prison. Livoti was released in April 2005, after serving six and a half years.

The death of Anthony Baez created wide media attention. Baez's death was seized on by people who said that the police are too quick to use deadly force. This was the third and most notable incident involving NYPD police brutality in 1994, and in some previous cases the officers were acquitted.

Baez's widow filed a $13 million wrongful death claim in 1995. She settled with the NYPD for $3 million in October 1998.

In 2000 the street where Baez died was renamed Anthony Baez Place.

== Film ==
A documentary film, Every Mother's Son, profiling the mothers of three men killed by the NYPD and their legal and political efforts, was made in 2004, about the cases of Gidone Busch, Amadou Diallo and Baez.

== See also ==
- List of killings by law enforcement officers in the United States
