= List of inmates at the United States Penitentiary, Atlanta =

This is a list of notable current and former inmates at the United States Penitentiary in Atlanta. Inmates who were released from custody prior to 1982 are not listed on the Federal Bureau of Prisons website.

== Mafia figures ==
Inmate Name	Register Number	Photo	Status	Details
Nicodemo Scarfo	09813-050		Transferred to FMC Butner; died of natural causes in 2017.	Boss of the Philadelphia crime family from 1981 to 1988; convicted in 1988 of racketeering conspiracy for directing Mafia activities including drug trafficking, loansharking, extortion, and murder.
Ignazio Lupo	Unlisted*		At USP Atlanta from 1910 to 1920 and from 1936 to 1946.	Founder of the Morello crime family in New York City, convicted of counterfeiting in 1910; returned to prison in 1936 for racketeering; suspect in numerous Mafia-related murders.
Jimmy Burke	Unlisted*		Released from custody in 1978 after serving 6 years.	Associate of the Lucchese crime family in New York City; Burke and fellow associate Henry Hill were convicted of extortion in 1972; Burke is the suspected mastermind of the 1978 Lufthansa Heist, in which nearly $6 million in cash and jewels were stolen at JFK Airport. Burke and Hill were portrayed in the 1990 film Goodfellas.
Al Capone	Unlisted*		Transferred to the federal prison on Alcatraz Island in 1934 by Atlanta Correctional Officer James D. Stephens.	Leader of the Chicago Outfit, which smuggled and bootlegged liquor during Prohibition in the 1920s; convicted of tax evasion in 1931.
Vincent Papa	Unlisted*		Murdered at USP Atlanta in 1977.	Associate of the Lucchese crime family in New York City; convicted in 1975 masterminding the theft of heroin seized during the French Connection investigation from the New York City Police Department property office from 1969 to 1972.

== Sports figures ==
Inmate Name	Register Number	Photo	Status	Details
Willie Aikens	01732-031		Released in 2008 after serving 14 years.	Former Major League Baseball player; convicted in 1994 of selling crack-cocaine.
Denny McLain	04000-018		Released from custody in 1988 after serving 29 months.	Major League baseball pitcher and two-time Cy Young Award winner; pleaded guilty in 1988 to racketeering and drug trafficking.

== Fraudsters ==
Inmate Name	Register Number	Photo	Status	Details
Frank Abagnale	Unlisted*		Escaped from USP Atlanta in 1971; captured several weeks later in New York City.	Notorious check forger portrayed in the 2002 film Catch Me If You Can.
Carlo Ponzi	Unlisted*		Released from custody in 1924 after serving 3 years.	Inventor of the financial fraud known as Ponzi scheme; convicted of mail fraud in 1920.

== Political prisoners ==
Inmate Name	Register Number	Photo	Status	Details
Eugene V. Debs	Unlisted*		Released in 1921 after his sentence was commuted by US President Warren G. Harding.	Founding member of Industrial Workers of the World and US Presidential candidate for the Socialist Party of America; convicted of sedition in 1918 for promoting opposition to the military draft during World War I; received over 900,000 votes while incarcerated in 1920.
Vilyam Genrikhovich Fisher	Unlisted*		Sentence commuted and released in 1962 as part of a prisoner exchange with the Soviet Union for the release of Francis Gary Powers and Frederic Pryor.	Convicted of espionage with relation to the Hollow Nickel Case and sentenced to 45 years' imprisonment
Marcus Garvey	Unlisted*		Released from custody in 1927 after serving 4 years.	Founder of the Universal Negro Improvement Association (UNIA) and leading figure in the Black Nationalist and Pan Africanist movements; convicted of mail fraud in 1923 for promoting the Black Star Line, a UNIA business dedicated to the transportation of goods and eventually throughout the African global economy.
Pedro Albizu Campos	Unlisted*		Transferred to a hospital prison in 1943 and released in 1947 after serving 10 years.	President of the Puerto Rican Nationalist Party from 1930 to 1965; convicted in 1936 of sedition in connection with the assassination of Puerto Rican Police Chief Elisha Riggs, which was in retaliation for the Río Piedras massacre, during which police killed four unarmed party supporters.

== Public officials ==
Inmate Name	Register Number	Photo	Status	Details
Ed Norris	41115-037		Released from custody in 2005 after serving 6 months.	Baltimore Police Commissioner from 2000 to 2002; pleaded guilty in 2004 to misusing police department funds for personal expenses and tax fraud.
George A. Caldwell	Unlisted*		Released from custody in 1941 after serving 1 year and pardoned by US President Harry Truman.	Louisiana contractor who supervised the construction of 26 public buildings; convicted in 1940 of tax evasion and accepting kickbacks in connection with the Louisiana Hayride scandals of 1939 and 1940.
William Colbeck	Unlisted*		Released in 1940 after serving 16 years.	Politician and organized crime figure in St. Louis; convicted in 1924 of two 1923 armed robberies which netted over $2 million.
Phil Driscoll	41294-074		Released from custody in 2008 after serving 1 year at the minimum-security prison camp.	Grammy-winning trumpeter; convicted in 2006 of conspiracy and tax evasion.

== Others ==
Inmate Name	Register Number	Photo	Status	Details
Roy Gardner	Unlisted*		Served several years of a 75-year sentence at USP Atlanta; attempted to escape in 1926.	Notorious bank robber and escape artist; stole over $350,000 in cash and securities from banks and mail trains in 1920 and 1921.
Harry Golden	Unlisted*		Released in 1932 after serving 3 years; pardoned by US President Richard Nixon in 1974.	American author and newspaper publisher; convicted of mail fraud in 1929.
Charles Harrelson	02582-016		Transferred to USP Florence ADX, the federal supermax prison in Colorado, after attempting to escape from USP Atlanta in 1995.	Convicted of murdering Federal Judge John H. Wood, Jr. in 1979 at the behest of a narcotics dealer; father of actor Woody Harrelson.

== See also ==
- United States Penitentiary, Atlanta
- List of U.S. federal prisons
- Federal Bureau of Prisons
- Incarceration in the United States
