= Point shaving =

Type of match fixing in sports

In organized sports, point shaving is a type of match fixing where the perpetrators try to change the final score of a game without the intention of changing who wins. This is typically done by players colluding with gamblers to prevent a team from covering a published point spread, where gamblers bet on the margin of victory. The practice of shaving points is illegal in some countries, and stiff penalties are imposed for those caught and convicted, including jail time.

A point-shaving scheme generally involves a sports gambler and one or more players of the team favored to win the game. In exchange for a bribe, the player or players agree to ensure that their team will not "cover the point spread" (the bribed player's team may still win but not by as big a margin as that predicted by bookmakers). The gambler then wagers against the bribed team. Alternatively, players on the team picked to lose may be bribed to lose by more points than the indicated point spread, and gamblers will wager on their opponents, the favorites, to cover the spread. Also, an official (referee) of the game may be bribed, or even bet on his own behalf, so that one or more "close calls" will be called in favor of the "underdog" rather than the team favored to win.

== Basketball ==
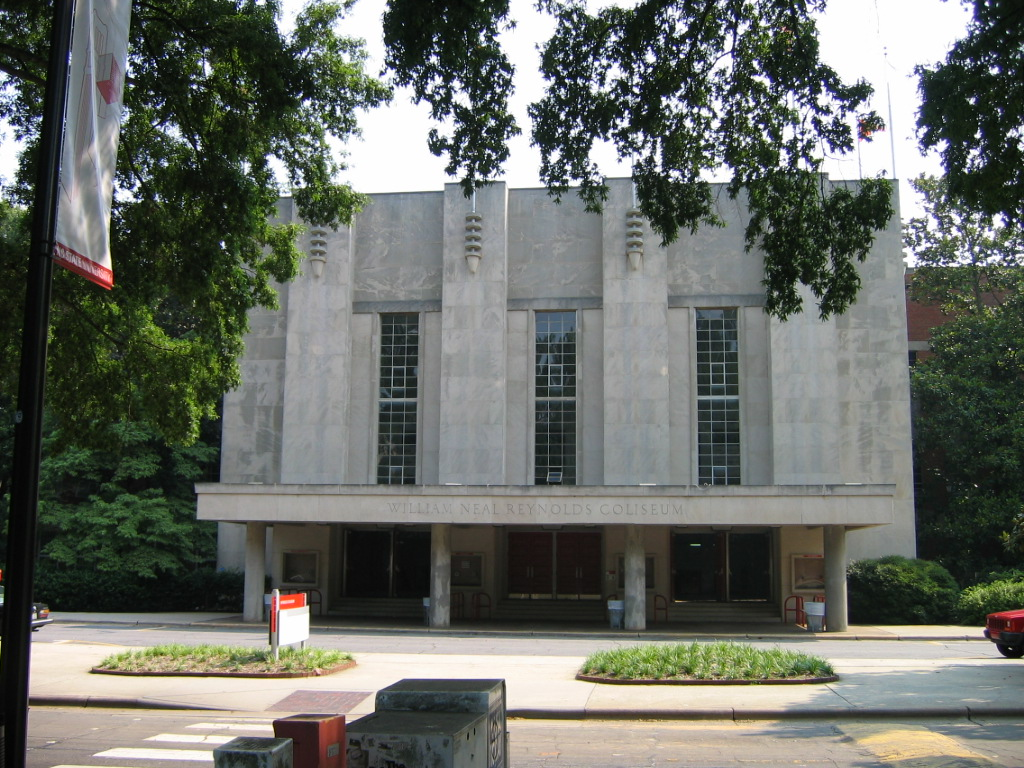
The Dixie Classic was played at Reynolds Coliseum in Raleigh, North Carolina

Basketball is a particularly easy medium for shaving points because of the scoring tempo of the game and the ease by which one player can influence key events. By deliberately missing shots or committing turnovers or fouls, a corrupt player can covertly ensure that their team fails to cover the point spread without an outright loss. This is further complicated due to the similar behavior of an honest player who takes a shot and misses. Although the NCAA has adopted a zero-tolerance policy with respect to gambling activity by its players; some critics believe that it unwittingly encouraged point shaving due to its formerly strict rules regarding amateurism, combined with the large amount of money wagered on its games. The NCAA has produced posters warning players not to engage in point shaving.

Famous examples of point shaving are the 1951 college basketball point-shaving scandal; the Dixie Classic and the greater NCAA University Division scandals of 1961, both of which were primarily led by former NBA All-Star Jack Molinas; the Boston College basketball point-shaving scandal of 1978–79, which was perpetrated by gangsters Henry Hill and Jimmy Burke; and the Tulane men's basketball point-shaving scandal of 1984–85, which led the university to disband its program for four seasons.

On 15 August 2007, NBA referee Tim Donaghy pleaded guilty to two felonies related to wagering on games that he officiated in a scheme somewhat related to point shaving. The difference in this case was that Donaghy sought to affect the outcome of over–under bets by changing calls so that both teams would score more than predicted, thus seeking to give the impression that at worst that he was merely strictly calling fouls as opposed to being outright biased.

On 15 January 2026, twenty people were federally charged with bribery, wire fraud and conspiracy in a scheme that involved 39 US college athletes on 17 NCAA Division I teams.

== In popular culture ==
In the television series The Sopranos, the character Carmine Lupertazzi Sr. was reputed to have invented the concept of point shaving in 1951.

Point shaving is an underlying plot thread in the 1974 film The Longest Yard and the 2005 remake. In both films, the character Paul "Wrecking" Crewe, a former professional quarterback, was kicked out of the NFL for point shaving prior to the events of the films.

In One Tree Hill, Nathan Scott, the star basketball player of Tree Hill High, colludes with a gambler to shave points during the North Carolina high school state semi-finals and finals. This eventually leads to him losing a scholarship to Duke University and temporarily derailing his college prospects. He bounces back from the scandal to play at a junior college, leading to a scholarship to the University of Maryland and a career in the NBA.
