= My Blue Heaven (1990 American film) =

1990 American comedy film

- Theatrical release poster
- Directed by: Herbert Ross
- Written by: Nora Ephron
- Produced by: Herbert Ross; Anthea Sylbert
- Starring: Steve Martin; Rick Moranis; Joan Cusack
- Cinematography: John Bailey
- Edited by: Robert M. Reitano; Stephen A. Rotter
- Music by: Ira Newborn
- Production company: Hawn/Sylbert Movie Company
- Distributed by: Warner Bros.
- Release date: August 17, 1990
- Running time: 95 minutes
- Country: United States
- Language: English
- Box office: $23.6 million

My Blue Heaven is a 1990 American crime comedy film directed by Herbert Ross, written by Nora Ephron, and starring Steve Martin, Rick Moranis, and Joan Cusack. This is the third film in which Martin and Moranis starred together. It has been noted for its relationship to Goodfellas, which was released one month later. Both films are based on the life of Henry Hill, although the character is renamed "Vincent 'Vinnie' Antonelli" in My Blue Heaven. Goodfellas was based on the book Wiseguy by Nicholas Pileggi, while the screenplay for My Blue Heaven was written by Pileggi's wife Nora Ephron, and much of the research for both works was done in the same sessions with Hill.

== Plot ==
Vinnie Antonelli is a former mobster recently inducted into the Witness Protection Program with his wife Linda in the suburbs near San Diego. The two are under the eye of federal agent Barney Coopersmith. Vinnie is assigned the name Todd Wilkinson.

As he is trying to adjust to suburban life, Vinnie slips into his usual dishonest ways. After stealing a car, he is arrested. Assistant DA Hannah Stubbs questions him, and he fabricates a series of elaborate lies.

Barney flashes his credentials, and frees Vinnie, telling Hannah that she can not hold him due to his upcoming testimony. Barney's partner Kirby convinces him to stake out the mall on Thanksgiving to catch someone looking to buy stolen credit cards, but Barney sees that it is "Todd" and sends Kirby home. Meanwhile, Vinnie follows Hannah into a pet store and comes across another ex-mobster, Billy Sparrow.

Vinnie and Barney find common ground when they find out that both of their wives left them. Linda went back to New York City because she misses it; Margaret leaves Barney because he is no fun.

Introduced to a group of other ex-mobsters, Vinnie finds out that the government stipend will be paid only until he testifies. Together, they start hijacking delivery trucks. Vinnie is stopped for speeding, and again questioned by Hannah after stolen merchandise was found in his trunk. Barney springs him again by pointing out that the police did not have a search warrant.

After flying to New York City to testify, Vinnie gives Barney the slip, first at the airport, then at the hotel. As Vinnie has not been laying low, two mobsters try to take him out, but Barney shoots a chandelier, scaring them off. Vinnie and Barney feel indebted to each other.

Back in San Diego, Vinnie gets Hannah and her sons Jamie and Tommy tickets to a baseball game. Inviting Barney as well, he has them sit together. The kids tell Vinnie that their baseball field has drainage problems, and he suggests a fundraiser to pay for it. Barney invites Hannah to a law enforcement cocktail party.

Vinnie meets his kind of woman in the supermarket. Her name is Shaldeen, and they elope to Reno. At the party, Barney dances with Hannah then they compare marital woes. Taking her home, he spends the night. The next morning, her ex-husband Will lets himself in, and Barney throws him out.

Although he still has three weeks before his assignment with Vinnie is completed, Barney and Kirby are placed undercover as Canadians fences in town to buy stolen goods from the hijacking ring. Meanwhile, the hijackers intercept a truckload of water-cooler bottles, and Vinnie distributes them around the town, marking them for donations for the little league.

Hannah discovers the fund raising scheme and arrests Vinnie again. Vinnie makes a deal for freedom in exchange for turning on his buyers. Hannah agrees, but when the fences turn out to be the FBI sting, Hannah prosecutes Vinnie under his real name, risking his safety over Barney's objections. Barney visits Vinnie in his cell, confesses his feelings for Hannah, and is angry at Vinnie for jeopardizing his new relationship.

In court, Hannah tries to convince the judge that there is no danger and Vinnie should not be released on bail, when two mafia hitmen open fire. Crystal Rybak, the officer who has a crush on Vinnie, gets him out of the courthouse, and he declares that he is in debt to her for life and they kiss. They escape to an active job site. Vinnie's ex-mob friends are breaking ground on a new little league ballpark. Barney convinces Hannah this was always the plan, and they make up.

One year later, everyone is at the town's new ballpark. The stands are full, and they are selling Vinnie's new book, 'How I Got Here', on the sidelines. He has married Crystal, and they have a baby. Linda and Shaldine are both present, having subsequently married men who were both also admitted into the witness protection program.

== Cast ==
- Steve Martin as Vinnie Antonelli / Tod Wilkinson
- Rick Moranis as Barney Coopersmith
- Joan Cusack as Hannah Stubbs
- Melanie Mayron as Crystal Rybak
- Bill Irwin as Kirby
- Carol Kane as Shaldeen
- William Hickey as Billy Sparrow / Johnny Bird
- Deborah Rush as Linda Antonelli
- Daniel Stern as Will Stubbs
- Jesse Bradford as Jamie Stubbs
- Corey Carrier as Tommie Stubbs
- Seth Jaffe as Umberto Mello
- Robert Miranda as Lilo Mello
- Ed Lauter as Robert Underwood
- Larry Block as Defense Attorney
- Julie Bovasso as Vinnie's mother
- Colleen Camp as Dr. Margaret Snow Coopersmith
- Gordon Currie as Wally Bunting
- Raymond O'Connor as Dino
- Troy Evans as Nicky
- Carol Ann Susi as Filomena
- Bonnie Briedis as an extra
- Sean Murray as an extra

== Production ==
In late 1987, executive producer-screenwriter Nora Ephron presented the concept for My Blue Heaven to actress Goldie Hawn, who initially expressed interest in the role of the district attorney. The project was under development at Warner Bros. Pictures with Allyn Stewart when a Writers Guild strike lasting twenty-two weeks began in March 1988, causing a delay in Ephron's completion of the script. In early 1989, Hawn declined the role, but she and her business partner, Anthea Sylbert, retained their positions as executive producer and producer, respectively.

The search for a prominent actor to lead the film commenced, with Steve Martin expressing interest in portraying the FBI agent. However, after Danny DeVito turned down the gangster role, Ephron suggested Martin consider the lead. At one point, Arnold Schwarzenegger was cast as Antonelli but left the project after receiving the lead role in Kindergarten Cop. After Martin agreed to take his place, producers cast Rick Moranis as Coopersmith.

Director Herbert Ross became available due to a delay in a different project, and production commenced in October 1989. Ross aimed to transcend mere escapist comedy, emphasizing the notion that "safety and comfort [lie in] middle-class values," asserting that fundamentally "everyone is middle class," even the gangster, who transforms into a "pillar of the suburban community." Ephron informed Martin that his character was more about hyperactivity than an accent. A pivotal moment in character creation occurred when Martin introduced an old costume from his former nightclub act—a "shiny, silver-gray jacket." Costume designer Joe Aulisi then crafted twenty-two light-colored designer suits in silks and sharkskins, featuring wide shoulders, lapels, and tight trousers to achieve a distinctive "lounge-lizard look."

The fictional town of Fryburg, California, was crafted using various locations, including San Luis Obispo, San Diego, Los Angeles, Atascadero, and Paso Robles, California. Some exterior scenes were filmed at Jack Murphy Stadium and the Hotel del Coronado terrace in San Diego, as well as the entrance of Atascadero city hall. During post-production, the ending of the story underwent a modification to adopt a "kinder, gentler ending."

== Music ==
The film's score was composed by Ira Newborn.

1. "My Blue Heaven" (Music: Walter Donaldson, Lyrics: George A. Whiting) – Fats Domino
2. "Surfin' U.S.A." (Chuck Berry and Brian Wilson) – The Beach Boys
3. "Stranger in Paradise" (Robert Wright and George Forrest) – Tony Bennett
4. "I Can't Help Myself (Sugar Pie Honey Bunch)" (Brian Holland, Lamont Dozier, and Eddie Holland) – Billy Hill
5. "The Boy from New York City" (John Taylor and George Davis) – The Ad Libs
6. "New York, New York" (John Kander and Fred Ebb)
7. "Take Me Out to the Ball Game" (Albert von Tilzer and Jerry Northworth)
8. "The Star-Spangled Banner" – United States Marine Band

== Reception ==
=== Box office ===
My Blue Heaven opened in 1,859 venues on August 17, 1990, and earned $6.2 million in its debut, ranking fourth in the North American box office and second among the week's new releases. It closed with a domestic gross of $23.6 million.

=== Critical response ===
On the review aggregator website Rotten Tomatoes, 71% of 21 critics' reviews are positive, with an average rating of 5.9/10. Metacritic reports a weighted average score of 35 out of 100, based on 14 critics, indicating "generally unfavorable reviews". Audiences polled by CinemaScore gave the film an average grade of "B−" on an A+ to F scale.

David J. Fox of The New York Times said the film was "a truly funny concept and a disappointment on the screen."

== See also ==
- List of media set in San Diego
