= Robert Germaine =

American drug trafficker

Robert Germaine, Sr. (October 1, 1925 – April 1986) was an American drug trafficker, burglar, and freelance writer in New York City.

== Criminal career ==
The son of French-Canadian immigrants, Germaine was a self-proclaimed freelance novelist and an expert "stick up man" who accompanied mobsters on hijacking jobs. He was an associate of the Lucchese crime family, and was initially affiliated with a crew headed by Christopher "Christie Tick" Furnari.

On January 3, 1972, Germaine was one of the gunmen of the Pierre Hotel armed robbery, where he and his seven cohorts, after binding and gagging the hotel employees, taking the Pierre under siege, ransacked the safe deposit boxes, and plundered an estimated $28,000,000 in jewels and cash. By the late 1970s, Germaine was associated with Henry Hill and Jimmy "the Gent" Burke, and was involved in Hill's criminal activities following the Lufthansa heist up to Hill's incarceration.

An excellent stick-up man and burglar, Germaine was married and had one son, a chemicals salesman and small-time drug dealer named Robert Germaine, Jr. Germaine, Sr. later became Henry Hill's partner in his heroin and cocaine trafficking ring on Long Island. At the time of his partnership with Hill, he was also a fugitive in connection with a botched armed robbery of a multi-million dollar wholesale jewelry store on East Fifty-Seventh Street in New York. Germaine, Sr. became a close friend of Hill after the latter hired his son Germaine, Jr. to do some landscaping at Hill's Rockville Centre home. Germaine, Jr. became a confidential informant and began providing information to law enforcement which led to the arrest of fifteen members of Hill's drug ring, including his own father, after he was arrested for selling $1,200 worth of Quaaludes to undercover police in Nassau County. He is portrayed in Goodfellas as the uncredited drug dealer played by Paul Herman.

=== Arrest and capture ===
Nassau County investigators raided Germaine's Long Island home wearing bulletproof vests and wielding riot shotguns. When the cops walked in, Germaine Sr. insisted they had the wrong man and showed them his false identification claiming he was a freelance writer. He even showed the investigators the manuscript he was working on. The police brought him to the station house for questioning, whereupon they brought out his police record that he had received for a robbery conviction in Albany, New York, thus falsifying his claim. Fingerprints taken after his arrest positively linked him with a botched multimillion dollar jewelry robbery in Manhattan.

His son, a high-school dropout who worked as a chemical store salesman, testified against his father during the trial. It was later revealed that Germaine Jr. turned into an informant for the police because of his own arrest for trafficking in cocaine and barbiturates supplied by his father.

In 1980, Robert Germaine Jr. was shot and killed in Kew Gardens, Queens on orders from Jimmy Burke. The hitman was Angelo Sepe, an associate of Burke.

== Writing career ==
Robert Germaine Sr. was never able to get his writing published after his drug trafficking incarceration in 1980. The subject of the manuscript he had been working on was never disclosed. He was later released and moved to somewhere in Dade County, Florida dying a short while later of unknown causes.
