= Robert's Lounge =

Saloon in Queens, New York City, US

Coordinates: 40°40′39″N 73°49′11″W

- Interactive map of Robert's Lounge
- Address: 114-45 Lefferts Boulevard; South Ozone Park, Queens, New York City, United States
- Type: Saloon

Robert's Lounge was a saloon located at 114-45 Lefferts Boulevard, in South Ozone Park, Queens, New York City.

Several notable figures of the American Mafia owned shares in the establishment, including James Burke and Vincent Asaro. Burke used the location, which included an attached building with a cellar clubhouse and mosaic floor, as a hub for illegal operations, including the Lufthansa heist and Boston College basketball point-shaving scandal. The group responsible for truck hijackings in Brooklyn and Queens and heists at John F. Kennedy International Airport were known as the "Robert's Lounge group". The saloon was used as a hangout by Paul Vario. The basement was a graveyard for mob victims. A human leg bone and a portion of a human shoulder bone were excavated from the basement on June 6, 1980. The bones were thought to have been those of two of Burke's associates, Thomas DeSimone and Martin Krugman, who went missing a short time after the Lufthansa heist.

Robert's Lounge was under control of new owners by 1980, and was known as South Side Inn. In 2015, a restaurant serving Guyanese and Jamaican food was operating at the former site of Robert's Lounge.

== Bibliography ==
- Pileggi, Nicholas (1986). Wiseguy: Life in a Mafia Family. Simon & Schuster. ISBN 0-671-44734-3.
- Volkman, Ernest; Cummings, John (October 1986). The Heist: How a Gang Stole $8,000,000 at Kennedy Airport and Lived to Regret It. New York: Franklin Watts. ISBN 0-531-15024-0.
