= Air France robbery =

1967 robbery at JFK Airport in New York City

The Air France robbery was a major robbery that took place in April 1967, when associates of the Lucchese crime family stole $420,000 ($3.01 million in 2024) from the Air France cargo terminal at New York City's JFK International Airport. While there were many cargo thefts at JFK airport in 1967, this was the largest cash robbery that had taken place at the time. It was carried out by Henry Hill, Robert McMahon, Tommy DeSimone, and Montague Montemurro, on a tip-off from McMahon. Hill believed it was the Air France robbery that endeared him to the Mafia.

== Planning ==
Air France was the carrier for American currency that had been exchanged in Southeast Asia. The airline had contracted to return the money to the US for depositing with American banks. The money was usually carried in linen bags, each containing US$60,000, and Air France shipped up to $1 million per week in this manner. The money was stored in a cement-block strong room with a round-the-clock private security guard.

According to Robert McMahon, who worked for Air France's cargo operation, Air France aircraft regularly delivered three or four $60,000 packages at a time, and he told Henry Hill that three or four men with pistols could easily steal it. However, it was difficult to predict when the money would be there, so a stickup was risky. Hill decided it would be better to steal the key so they could attempt to steal the money at a moment's notice without tipping off Air France that they knew about the money. Reconnaissance missions revealed that the most difficult obstacle would be the security guard, who kept the key with him at all times, even on days off.

A break into the guard's home turned up a potential vulnerability: women. McMahon introduced the guard to an expensive escort at The Jade East Motel located near JFK International Airport. In time, the guard and the escort became intimate. After a number of dry runs, McMahon and the escort were able to distract the guard long enough for Hill to retrieve the key from his pants and make a copy.

== Execution ==
McMahon received notice that between $400,000 and $700,000 would be delivered on Friday, April 7, 1967. He said the best time for the actual robbery would be just before midnight, when the security guard would be on his meal break.

On the day of the robbery, Hill and Tommy DeSimone drove to the Air France cargo terminal at John F. Kennedy International Airport with an empty suitcase, the largest Hill could find. At 11:40 p.m, they entered the Air France cargo terminal. McMahon said that they should just walk in, as people often came to the terminal to pick up lost baggage. DeSimone and Hill entered the unsecured area unchallenged. They unlocked the door with the duplicate key. Using a small flashlight, they found seven of the bags, which they loaded into the suitcase and left. No alarm was raised, no shots fired, and no one was injured. The theft was not discovered until the following Monday, when a Wells Fargo truck arrived to pick up the cash to be delivered to the French American Banking Corporation.

== Portrayal in film ==
The robbery was portrayed in the 1969 film Le clan des siciliens by Henri Verneuil and the 1990 film Goodfellas by Martin Scorsese. The latter film portrayed it being an inside job, with a security guard simply giving Henry Hill a key (as opposed to attempting to copy one), and also used the significantly more lucrative Lufthansa heist of 1978 to show the deadly consequences of the following internal fight between the robbers.
