= The Big Heist =

2001 Canadian-American TV movie

- Genre: Crime; Docudrama
- Based on: The Heist by: Ernest Volkman; John Cummings
- Written by: Jere Cunningham; Gary Hoffman
- Directed by: Robert Markowitz
- Starring: Donald Sutherland; John Heard; Jamie Harris; Janet Kidder
- Music by: Lou Pomanti
- Country of origin: United States
- Original language: English

Production
- Executive producer: Gary Hoffman
- Producers: Robert Markowitz; Mark Winemaker
- Production location: Toronto
- Cinematography: Rudolf Blahacek
- Editor: David Beatty
- Running time: 92 minutes
- Production companies: Alliance Atlantis; Gary Hoffman Productions

Original release
- Network: A&E
- Release: June 10, 2001

The Big Heist is a 2001 crime drama television film directed by Robert Markowitz and written by Jere Cunningham and Gary Hoffman. The film, based on the 1986 non-fiction book The Heist by Ernest Volkman and John Cummings, tells the story of the 1978 Lufthansa heist. It is a co-production of the United States and Canada, and stars Donald Sutherland, John Heard, Jamie Harris, and Janet Kidder. It aired on A&E on June 10, 2001.

== Plot ==
Based on the 1986 book The Heist: How a Gang Stole $8,000,000 at Kennedy Airport and Lived to Regret It, the film tells the story about the 1978 Lufthansa heist.

== Cast ==
- Donald Sutherland as Jimmy Burke
- John Heard as Detective Richard Woods
- Jamie Harris as Frankie Burke
- Janet Kidder as Maria
- Nick Sandow as Henry Hill
- Michael P. Moran as Louis "The Whale", inspired by Louis Cafora
- Joe Pingue as Martin Krugman
- Bo Rucker as Parnell "Stacks" Edwards
- Rocco Sisto as Tommy DeSimone
- Robert Morelli as Angelo Sepe
- Joe Maruzzo as Paolo Falcone, inspired by Paolo LiCastri
- Gino Marrocco as Paulie Vario
- Sam Coppola as Paul Castellano
- Steven Randazzo as John Gotti
- Craig Eldridge as FBI Agent Billings

== Production ==
=== Similar projects ===
The heist was also the subject of the much better-known 1990 film Goodfellas, directed by Martin Scorsese, and of the 1991 made-for-television film, The 10 Million Dollar Getaway. Filming took place in Toronto.

=== Historical context ===
Although the movie correctly depicts the Lufthansa heist, showing Jimmy Burke as the leader of a crew linked to Paulie Vario, the crew wasn't part of the Gambino family as depicted, but rather was a large part of the Lucchese crime family, and the robbery brought a large quantity of funding for Tony Corallo.

The film depicts Burke as an Irish immigrant, speaking with a strong Irish accent; he was in fact born and raised in the United States.

Although Burke did have connections with John Gotti, Gotti was never involved with the Lufthansa heist nor did he want to be a part of it. According to a rumour, on an FBI wire tap from the 1980s years after the original heist, Gotti was heard to say to underboss and his capo Aniello Dellacroce: "I didn't want any part of that shit that Burke and those other fucks pulled. Only micks would do something crazy like this. Micks are fucking crazy; end of fucking statement". It was also alleged by Hill, in Hill's book The Lufthansa Heist, that John Gotti personally killed Tommy DeSimone, a member of the stick-up team.
