= Vincent Asaro =

American mobster (1937–2023)

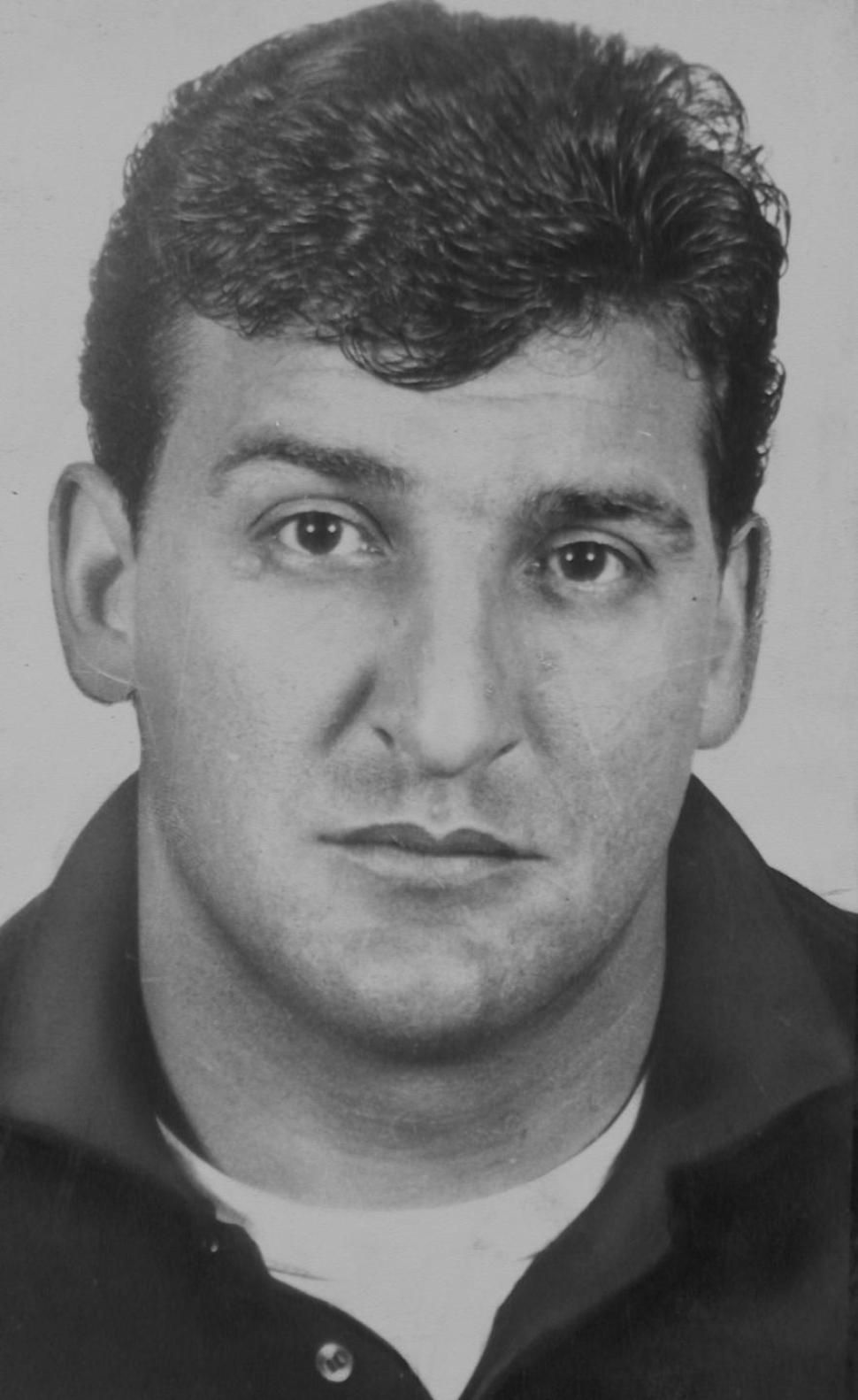
- 1966 Mugshot of Asaro
- Born: July 10, 1935; New York City, U.S.
- Died: October 22, 2023 (aged 88); New York City, U.S.
- Occupation: Mobster
- Allegiance: Bonanno crime family
- Conviction: Arson (2017)
- Penalty: Eight years' imprisonment

Vincent "Vinny" Asaro (July 10, 1935 – October 22, 2023) was an American mobster who served as a caporegime in the Bonanno crime family. Born in Queens, a borough of New York City, he was arrested by the FBI on January 23, 2014 and indicted on charges related to the 1978 Lufthansa heist at John F. Kennedy International Airport. He was found not guilty in November 2015 of the charges, and was also acquitted of all charges in the 1969 murder of Paul Katz, who owned a warehouse in which Asaro and another suspect housed stolen goods. He was also indicted in March 2017 and was sentenced to eight years in prison.

== Mob career ==
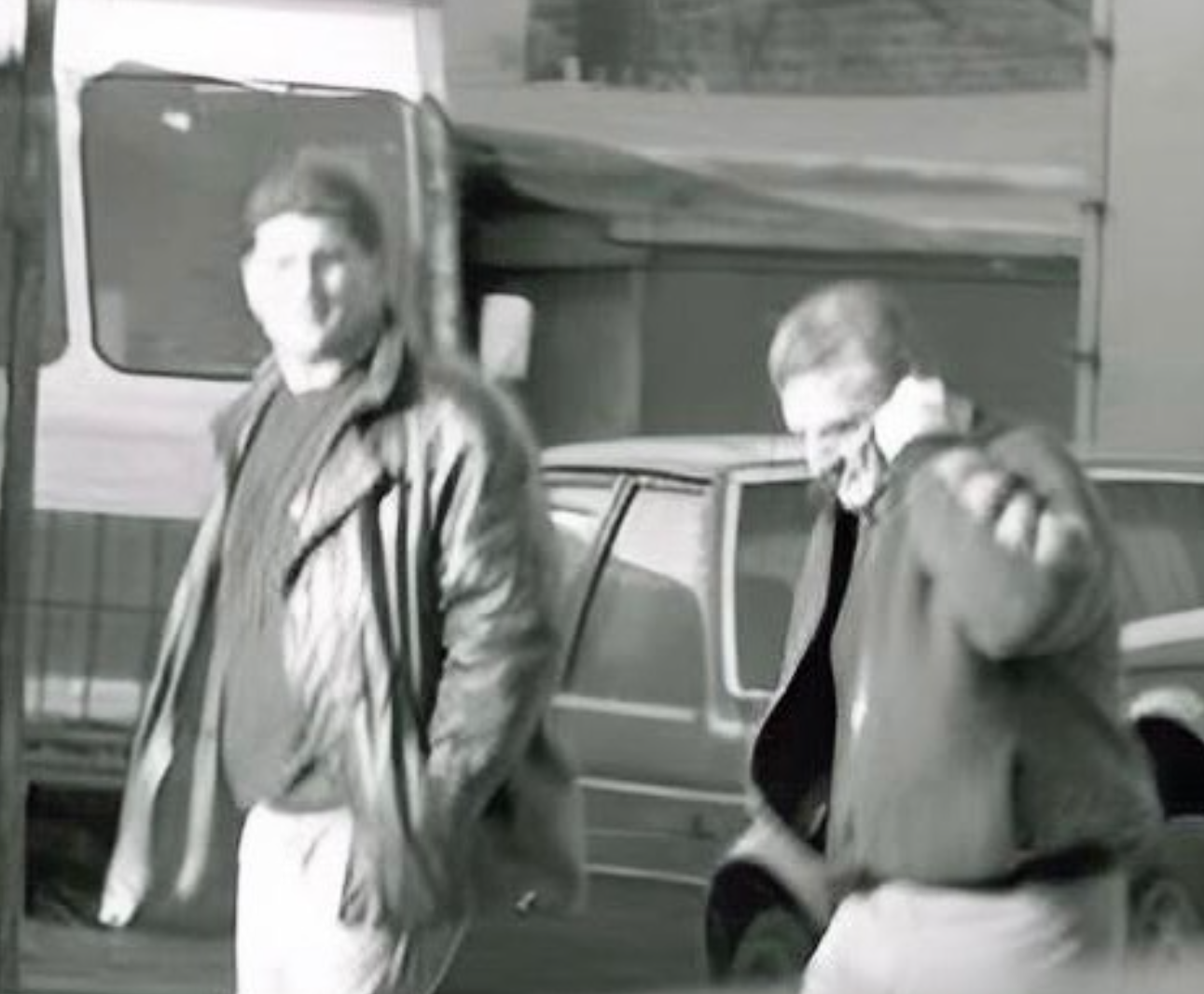
FBI surveillance photo of Vincent Asaro (R) and his son Jerome Asaro (L) in 1989 walking Meeker Ave in Brooklyn

Vincent Asaro was born in Ozone Park, Queens on July 10, 1935, his father was Girolamo Asaro (1913-1977, Who his son is named after) and his mother was Josephine Valenti. His father was the brother-in-law to Michael Zaffarano. In 1979, after the murder of Bonanno boss Carmine Galante, Asaro became a capo of a Queens crew in the Bonanno family. In February 1980, his uncle Michael Zaffarano died.

Asaro's grandfather Vincenzo was born in 1892 in Castellammare del Golfo, Sicily. He is a distant cousin of Joe Bonanno and family. Vincenzo’s sister Brigida Asaro married Vito Bonventre (born 1891), the brother of his close business associate and fellow mobster Giovanni Bonventre. Vincenzo (grandfather of Vincent) was the main suspect in the 1930 murder of Catello Coppola.

According to Lucchese crime family associate turned informant Henry Hill, Asaro was a caporegime in the Bonanno crime family, who oversaw the family's interests in JFK airport.

Asaro would help his son Jerome Asaro become a member of the Bonanno family and in the taking over of his crew. However, Asaro and his son had a falling out in later years and did not speak with each other.

== Lufthansa heist accusations ==
On January 23, 2014, Asaro was arrested by the FBI and indicted on federal racketeering charges stemming from the 1978 Lufthansa heist. The charges also included the theft of $1.25 million of gold salts, involvement in the pornography industry, and for the ordering of the murder of a cousin who testified in court. Arrested along with Asaro were his son Jerome, acting boss Thomas DiFiore, acting capo Giacomo Bonventre, and soldier John Ragano.

Controversially, author Daniel Simone, Henry Hill's co-writer of their book, The Lufthansa Heist, published on August 1, 2015 by Lyons Press, claims that Hill asserted to him that "Asaro had no involvement in the famous robbery." In fact, Asaro does not appear nor is he mentioned in Simone's book. Furthermore, in the Author's Notes and Sources page of The Lufthansa Heist, Simone lists numerous law enforcement agents who collaborated with him in the development of the book and, he attests, none of these subjects ever mentioned Asaro in connection with the Lufthansa robbery. More strangely, those investigators had not known about a Gaspar Valenti, the informant who testified against Asaro, his cousin.

In November 2015, Asaro was found not guilty of all charges related to the Lufthansa heist. Upon leaving the courthouse after his acquittal he was infamously heard joking to his lawyer "Don't let them see the body in the trunk".

== Paul Katz murder suspect ==
Asaro was also a suspect in the 1969 death of Paul Katz. Katz owned a warehouse that Asaro and James Burke used to store stolen goods. When law enforcement raided the warehouse, Asaro and Burke immediately suspected Katz of being a government informant. The two men allegedly killed Katz with a dog chain and buried his remains under a vacant house. When the NYPD reopened the Katz case, Asaro and Burke allegedly moved the remains to the house of Burke's daughter and reburied them there. In 2013, a police search uncovered the remains.

Asaro was arrested and tried for the murder of Paul Katz, but was acquitted of all charges on November 12, 2015.

== Arson order ==
In March 2017, Asaro was indicted and charged in an arson case. In June 2017, Asaro pleaded guilty in a case of ordering car arson against a motorist who had cut him off in Howard Beach, Queens in April 2012. Prosecutors allege that Asaro enlisted a Bonanno crime family associate to execute the crime; however, the associate then engaged the grandson of former Gambino crime family boss John Gotti, John J. Gotti (who also pleaded guilty in the case), and he carried out the order in his stead. The day after the incident, Asaro apparently contacted a Gambino crime family associate who had access to a local police department database. The database linked the car plate to the home address of the driver. Prosecutors also alleged that Gotti was the getaway driver during a $6,000 bank robbery in 2012; he and another man pleaded guilty. Asaro was incarcerated at the Metropolitan Detention Center, Brooklyn while awaiting sentencing. He faced the possibility of up to 20 years in prison, meanwhile prosecutors were seeking 15 years in prison. The Brooklyn prosecutors said that although Asaro had "participated in racketeering, murder, robbery, extortion, loansharking, gambling and other illegal conduct, he has served less than eight years in jail." In late December 2017, Asaro was sentenced to eight years in prison. Initially scheduled to be released from the United States Medical Center for Federal Prisoners in 2022, he was granted a compassionate release on April 14, 2020, and released six days later, due to his age and health vulnerability (he had a stroke the year prior) because of the risk of COVID-19 amid the COVID-19 pandemic in the United States.

== Death ==
Vincent Asaro died in Queens, New York on October 22, 2023, at the age of 88.
