= Thomas Agro =

American mobster (1931–1987)

- Thomas Agro
- Born: November 29, 1931; New York City, New York, U.S.
- Died: August 31, 1987 (aged 55); New York City, New York, U.S.
- Other names: Tommy A, T.A., Tipp, and Thomas Ambrosiano
- Allegiance: Gambino crime family

Thomas Agro (November 29, 1931 – August 31, 1987), also known as "Tommy A", "T.A.", "Tipp", and "Thomas Ambrosiano", was a New York gangster with the Gambino crime family who ran lucrative bookmaking and gambling operations in Florida.

== Biography ==
In 1975 or 1976, Agro became a "made man," or full member, of the Gambino crime family. Agro was sponsored for membership by Joseph N. Gallo, the family consigliere and worked under Joseph Armone, one of Paul Castellano's most trusted associates. While Agro was never promoted being above soldier, he enjoyed a privileged relationship with family boss Paul Castellano. During this period, Agro was sent to prison for bookmaking. By 1976, Agro was dividing his time between New York and Palm Beach County, Florida.

In Florida, Agro chose mobster Joseph Iannuzzi as his representative. Iannuzzi enjoyed the attention and respect he received when Agro was in Florida. The two mobsters frequented the top nightspots and betting tracks. It was while at the greyhound racing tracks that Agro coined Iannuzzi's nickname, "Joe Dogs". Iannuzzi was given free rein to operate on behalf of Agro and the Gambino crime family. Iannuzzi operated bookmaking and loansharking while engaging in the occasional robbery and burglary. When Agro's sponsor, Joe N. Gallo, visited Florida, Iannuzzi would look after him.

In 1980, the Agro/Iannuzzi relationship began to fizzle. Agro had previously lent Ianuzzi a sizeable amount of money to be used to facilitate a loanshark book. Ianuzzi was supposed to pay Agro several percentage basis points ("points") a week. Ianuzzi would then offer loans to fellow criminals and gamblers at several additional points. The difference, called the "spread," would be Iannuzzi's profit. Ianuzzi would hold several weeks' or months' worth of interest ("vig"), delivering it to Agro whenever he visited New York. At other times, Agro would visit Iannuzzi in Florida to collect the interest. Agro had plans to invest the illegal interest into legitimate businesses. However, Ianuzzi soon fell several months behind in delivering the money to Agro. Later in 1980, while visiting New York, Ianuzzi deliberately snubbed Agro.

On January 19, 1981, the enraged Agro found Ianuzzi at the Don Ritz Pizzeria on Singer Island, Florida and severely beat him with a baseball bat. After surviving this attack, Ianuzzi decided to start working as an informant for the Federal Bureau of Investigation (FBI). Since Ianuzzi had been assaulted with a bat, the FBI agents appropriately dubbed the case Operation Home Run. Ianuzzi now paid Agro the delinquent money (with funds supplied by the FBI), and Agro welcomed him back to the family. Ianuzzi now wore a hidden listening device whenever he met with Agro and other Florida mobsters. On one tape, Agro told Iannuzzi that he had survived the January attack only because the pizzeria owner's wife entered the room. On one occasion, Agro confessed to the murders of Lucchese associates Anthony DeSimone and Thomas DeSimone. However, Ianuzzi was not recording at that moment, so Agro was never convicted of these murders.

In 1984, Agro was prosecuted at the Home Run trials in Florida for loan sharking, extortion, and attempted murder. After being sentenced to fifteen years in a federal penitentiary, Agro fled to Quebec, where he was joined by LuAnn. The couple later moved to the Nuns' Island section of Montreal, where he deserted LuAnn for another woman, Ann Okcha. Later in 1984, the Royal Canadian Mounted Police (RCMP) arrested Agro. He was soon repatriated to the United States and sent to prison. In 1986, Agro was released from prison due to an inoperable brain tumor.

On February 11, 1987, Agro pleaded guilty to federal racketeering charges in a court session held in his hospital room at Mount Sinai Hospital in New York. Agro died later in 1987.

== In popular culture ==
- In the 1990 film Goodfellas, the character "Vinnie" (played by Charles Scorsese, the father of director Martin Scorsese) is based on Agro. Vinnie is seen cooking sauce while in prison and when the character Tommy DeVito (based on Thomas DeSimone) is murdered.
- Agro is portrayed by Ron Gabriel in the 2001 film Boss of Bosses.
