= Wiseguy (book) =

1985 crime non-fiction book by Nicholas Pileggi

Wiseguy: Life in a Mafia Family
- Hardcover edition
- Author: Nicholas Pileggi
- Language: English
- Subject: Henry Hill, Mafia, criminals, case studies
- Genre: True crime, non-fiction
- Publisher: Simon & Schuster
- Publication date: 1985
- Publication place: United States
- Media type: Print (hardcover & paperback), eBook, audio cassette, audio CD, Audible Audio Edition, Amazon Kindle
- Pages: 256 pp (hardcover)
- ISBN: 0-671-44734-3
- OCLC: 12558700
- Dewey Decimal: 364.15092
- LC Class: HV6248.H453 P54 1985

Wiseguy: Life in a Mafia Family is a 1985 non-fiction book by crime reporter Nicholas Pileggi that chronicles the life of Henry Hill, a Mafia associate turned informant. The book is the basis for the 1990 Academy Award–winning film Goodfellas directed by Martin Scorsese.

== Summary ==
Henry Hill began his life of crime at age 11 in 1955, by working as a go-fer for Paul Vario, the local boss of Hill's working-class Irish/Italian neighborhood. Vario quickly "promoted" Hill to selling loose cigarettes and other stolen goods on his behalf. In 1959, Hill was arrested for the first time for using stolen credit cards. Hill refused to cooperate with the police, earning the respect of Vario and Vario's close associate, hijacker and fence Jimmy Burke.

In 1960, when Hill was 17, he enlisted in the United States Army, to the surprise of his peers. When questioned about his decision by Vario, Hill explained that he wanted to please his father, who disapproved of his son's association with the Mafia. While stationed at Fort Bragg in North Carolina, however, Hill continued his criminal activities, which led to his dishonorable discharge in 1963. He returned to the streets of New York, where he was happily welcomed back by Vario and Burke.

In 1964, Hill met Tommy DeSimone, aka "Two Gun Tommy," a young aspiring gangster with violent tendencies, and both worked as stick-up men for Vario, hijacking trucks and stealing their contents for resale. In 1965, Hill reluctantly joined Vario's son on a double date, where he met Karen Friedman, a young Jewish woman from the Five Towns section of New York. Hill and Friedman continued to date, and they eloped only four months after meeting. They had their first child, Gregg, in 1966, and a second, Gina, in 1968.

In 1969, Hill began an affair with Linda Coppociano behind Karen's back and invested the profits of his crimes into purchasing a restaurant/lounge called The Suite. It was there that, on June 11, 1970, Burke and DeSimone murdered William Bentvena (also known as William "Billy Batts" Devino), a made man with the Gambino crime family and a close friend of Gambino family captain and future Boss John Gotti.

In 1978, Burke masterminded a robbery of the Lufthansa cargo terminal at John F. Kennedy International Airport after being tipped off to the lax security by an inside man. The heist was carried out by DeSimone and Burke's associates Robert "Frenchy" McMahon and Montague Montemurro in December of that year.

In 1980, Hill was arrested for heroin trafficking, and, knowing that he was facing a long sentence and that Burke and Vario were planning to kill him, decided to become an informant and entered the Witness Protection Program.
