= Edward A. McDonald =

American lawyer and actor, born 1947

Edward A. McDonald (born 1947) is an American criminal defense lawyer and actor. He practices law at the New York City branch of Dechert LLP, primarily working on white-collar crime and securities law. McDonald has appeared in Goodfellas and in Kiss of Death.

== Early life and career ==
McDonald graduated from Xaverian High School in Brooklyn and then attended Boston College, earning a degree in 1968. He earned his juris doctor degree from Georgetown University Law Center. After serving as an assistant district attorney in Manhattan for five years, McDonald joined the United States Organized Crime Strike Force in 1977. McDonald prosecuted a case involving the 1978–79 Boston College basketball point-shaving scandal for the Justice Department in 1981.

As a prosecutor, McDonald sponsored Henry Hill in significant cases in which he testified, including the Boston College point-shaving case. McDonald also helped get Hill and his wife Karen Friedman Hill into the United States Federal Witness Protection Program (WPP). Martin Scorsese cast McDonald to play himself in the 1990 film Goodfellas in a scene in which McDonald negotiates to get the Hills into the WPP. McDonald improvised the line, "Don't give me the babe-in-the-woods routine, Karen. I heard you on those wiretaps." The line was based on what McDonald recalled saying to the real Karen Hill.

McDonald started practicing law privately in 1989. In 2011, the Police Benevolent Association of the City of New York hired McDonald and other high-profile lawyers to defend against a massive ticket fixing scandal. McDonald represented former mobster Joseph Massino in 2013 after Massino's two life sentences, imposed in 2011, were commuted by a federal judge.

He has been a member of the Screen Actors Guild since 1990. He is married and has three children.
