= 1978–79 Boston College basketball point-shaving scandal =

Basketball point fixing scheme

The 1978–79 Boston College basketball point-shaving scandal involved a scheme in which members of the American Mafia recruited and bribed multiple Boston College Eagles men's basketball players to ensure the team would either not win by the required margin (not cover the point spread) or win by the required margin (cover the point spread), thus allowing gamblers in the know to place wagers for or against that team and win.

== Scheme proposal ==
The scheme was conceived by Rocco Perla and his brother Anthony in Pittsburgh, Pennsylvania, during the summer of 1978. The Perla brothers were small-time gamblers who saw the upcoming 1978–79 Boston College Eagles basketball season as a perfect opportunity to earn a lot of money. Needing an inside man, the brothers wanted to recruit Rick Kuhn, a high school friend of Rocco who was entering his senior year at Boston College and was expected to be a key member of the 1978–79 Eagles team.

The Perla brothers proposed a simple scheme: they, along with Kuhn, would select certain basketball games where the projected point spread separating Boston College from its opponent was expected to be significant. Kuhn would be responsible for ensuring, by his play on the court, that Boston College fell short of the point spread. Thus, for example, if participating bookmakers determined Boston College to be an eight-point favorite in a particular game, Kuhn would be paid a bonus, usually $2,500, if they won by less than eight points. In addition, they were given the opportunity to bet the money they were paid and double their winnings. Kuhn agreed to participate, and brought in his teammate Jim Sweeney.

== Setup ==
The Perla brothers mobilized a betting syndicate to maximize their potential gain from the scheme. They contacted a local friend, Paul Mazzei, who was known to have influence within major New York gambling circles. Mazzei in turn contacted Henry Hill, a Lucchese crime family associate from New York who had befriended Mazzei while both men were serving sentences in a federal prison. Mazzei and the Perla brothers were particularly hopeful that Hill would enlist the support of his associate, James Burke, to finance the payments to the players and to set up a network of bookmakers who were in on the scheme. These bookies could handle large bets and lay them off and spread the bets among a number of unsuspecting bookmakers around the country so as not to arouse suspicion. They would also ensure protection for the enterprise in the event that the unsuspecting bookmakers, all of whom had toughs at their disposal to collect unpaid debts, discovered they were being hoodwinked. Hill and Burke were brought into the scheme, after receiving approval from Lucchese family capo Paul Vario.

Burke, through Hill, would front the money to pay the players, forwarding the money through Mazzei and the Perla brothers. The same channels would be used for the passing of the point spread from Burke and Hill to the players. Burke had Hill fly to Boston on November 16, 1978, to meet with Mazzei, Kuhn, Tony Perla, and any other member of the Eagles team interested in participating in their scheme. Said Hill, "I asked the players which of the upcoming games they felt we could shave. Sweeney took out one of those little schedule cards, circled the games he thought we could fool around with, and gave the card to me. They kept saying that they liked the idea of just shaving points and not blowing the games." However, as noted below, the scheme also worked in games where the Eagles were expected to lose anyway, with them shaving points so that the syndicate could bet on the other team winning by more than the point spread.

== Point fixing ==
In their game against Providence on December 6, 1978, Boston College's team was favored to win by six to seven points. Kuhn was thus expected to keep the score below the six- to seven-point margin. However, the test run for the scheme proved unsuccessful when Boston College established an early lead and ultimately won the game by nineteen points. Enraged by their gambling loss, the Perla brothers, along with Mazzei, Burke and Hill, decided to recruit additional Eagles players to enhance their control over the outcome of the games. They had Kuhn approach Ernie Cobb, the leading scorer on the team, but it has never been proven if Cobb agreed to cooperate. Burke instructed Hill to warn the players to keep to their end of the deal because "you can't play basketball with broken hands."

The December 16 game against Harvard was chosen as the second test for the scheme. Boston College was favored by twelve to thirteen points, but won the game by only a three-point margin, 86–83. The syndicate was very happy with this result, and Kuhn was given cash to distribute to the players for their efforts. The scheme continued to work successfully in the December 23 game against UCLA. In this game, UCLA was favored to win over the Eagles by a fifteen to eighteen-point spread, so the syndicate bet on them to win by a margin greater than the point spread. The Eagles managed to lose by 22 points, 103–81, with the syndicate winning its bet.

Suspecting that some bookmakers might be getting wise to the scheme, the conspirators temporarily revised their strategy after the UCLA game. To allay any suspicions of foul play, they decided to bet on Boston College to win by more than the point spread ("cover the spread") in a game that they were confident the Eagles would win handily. The conspirators chose the January 17, 1979, game against Connecticut to implement this plan. Their strategy was effective – Boston College, a five-point favorite, covered the spread with a 90–80 win over Connecticut.

In early February, Boston College was scheduled to play two New York State teams, Fordham and St. John's. The conspirators decided that these games presented especially good opportunities because New York bookmakers generally accepted large bets for New York teams. They reintroduced the original strategy, which proved successful for the February 3 Fordham game when Boston College, a ten-point favorite, won by seven points. The February 6 game against St. John's was a "push" (winning back exact bets), as the syndicate neither won nor lost when St. John's prevailed 85–76, the exact point spread (nine) the bookmakers had offered. (Note: The syndicate was able to lay nine points when the game was first available to be bet, and therefore pushed. Bookmakers, on seeing the heavy action, moved the line as high as twelve to discourage bets on the favorite (St. John's) and attract more bets on the underdog. Those later betters on St. John's lost money because they laid more than the eventual nine point margin of victory.)

Confident from their recent success, the conspirators viewed the February 10 game against Holy Cross as an opportunity to reap the full benefits of their scheme. They were aware that bookmakers generally accepted large bets on this game both because Boston College and Holy Cross were traditional rivals and because the game was being nationally televised. Holy Cross was favored to win and, consistent with the scheme, were bet on to win by a margin greater than the seven-point spread. (Note: In this case, while the line may have opened, or at one time gone to two, because of the heavy betting on Holy Cross, the syndicate had to lay as many as seven points and therefore lost their bet.) Holy Cross ultimately won by only two points, as Cobb scored eight points in the final minute to bring the Eagles close, and everyone involved lost a substantial amount of money. Hill stated that, at the time, he and Burke were watching the game on television at Burke's home in Queens, and Burke put his foot through the television in anger at having lost $50,000 ($221,800 today). Said Hill, "He wanted me to fly up to Boston. Ultimately, nothing happened. Jimmy said he was finished. He didn't want to be bothered with these kids anymore." The scheme thus ended on an unsuccessful note.

Boston College's basketball team ended their 1978–79 season with a 22–9 record. The players involved in the scandal were paid between $500 and $1,000 for each game and were given the chance to double it betting on the games. Hill reportedly cleared over $100,000 ($443,600 today) and bettors higher up the line were said to have made up to $250,000 ($1,109,000 today).

== Uncovering of the scheme ==
The conspiracy unraveled in 1980 after Hill was arrested by New York State authorities on drug trafficking charges and was subsequently implicated in the Lufthansa heist, which occurred while the point-shaving scheme was underway. Hill turned state's evidence in exchange for avoiding prison and possible execution by Burke and the Lucchese family. While he was being questioned, FBI agents inadvertently mentioned Hill's frequent trips to Boston around the time of the Lufthansa heist. Hill revealed his involvement in the point-shaving scheme, offering to relate the full story if federal officials would guarantee him full immunity and would agree to intercede on his behalf to convince state officials to drop the drug charges pending in state court. Edward A. McDonald, who coincidentally had graduated from Boston College in 1968 and who had played briefly on the basketball team, prosecuted the case.

A grand jury indicted Burke, Mazzei, Kuhn and the Perla brothers. Hill was listed as a co-conspirator but was not named as a defendant. At trial in 1981, the government's case consisted primarily of the testimony of Hill and three other witnesses: Sweeney and Joseph Beaulieu, both Boston College players, and Barbara Reed, a 23-year-old nurse who lived with Kuhn during the 1978–79 Eagles season. The government presented telephone records showing evidence of extensive communications between the conspirators during the 1978–79 season and records provided by Western Union and various hotels which further corroborated government testimony.

After a four-week trial, each conspirator was convicted on charges of conspiracy, conspiracy to commit sports bribery and interstate travel with the intent to commit bribery. Burke was sentenced to twelve years' imprisonment. Kuhn was sentenced to ten years' imprisonment, later reduced to 28 months. Mazzei and Tony Perla were sentenced to ten years' imprisonment. Rocco Perla was sentenced to four years' imprisonment. Sweeney was not charged. Cobb was acquitted of any wrongdoing, despite Kuhn giving Cobb's girlfriend an allegedly unsolicited envelope with $1,000.

== Affected games ==
Date	Opponent	Bet (Note: Bets in this column are given in the format "Team [+|−][Points|(Points–Points)]". Team is the team bet on – either Opp (opponent) or BC; + or − means they were either an underdog or favorite, respectively; Points is either a single number or a range of numbers when bets had to be made at different spreads as the line moved due to action.)	Winner (Note: Winner is given as either Opp or BC and the margin of victory)	Score	Result (Note: Result is the outcome of the syndicate's bets.)
December 6, 1978	Providence	Opp +(6–7)	BC 19	83–64	Lose
December 16, 1978	Harvard	Opp +(12–13)	BC 3	86–83	Win
December 23, 1978	UCLA	Opp −(15–18)	Opp 22	103–81	Win
January 10, 1979	Rhode Island	Opp −15 (Note: While the line may have been as low as 13 at some point, the syndicate had to lay 15, and therefore lost their bet when Rhode Island won by only 13.)	Opp 13	91–78	Lose
January 17, 1979	UConn	BC −5	BC 10	90–80	Win
January 20, 1979	Holy Cross	BC −2 (Note: In this case, while the spread was as high as 5, the syndicate was able to lay just 2 points, and therefore pushed when Holy Cross won by 2.)	BC 2	89–87	Push
February 3, 1979	Fordham	Opp +10	BC 7	71–64	Win
February 6, 1979	St. John's	Opp −9	Opp 9	85–76	Push
February 10, 1979	Holy Cross	Opp −7	Opp 2	98–96	Lose

== Aftermath ==
Following the results of the Boston College point-shaving scandal, the NBA would permanently ban Cobb (who had previously been drafted by the Utah Jazz in 1979 and at one point tried out for the New Jersey Nets before being discovered to have been involved), Kuhn and Sweeney from playing in the NBA. As of 2025, they would be the last three individuals to have been permanently banned from the NBA following major scandals coming to light during their college basketball careers. Since then, other players to have been discovered in some serious scandals during their college careers, such as John "Hot Rod" Williams from the University of Tulane's point-shaving scandal in the 1980s, Stevin Smith from Arizona State University's point-shaving scandal in the 1990s, and Gary Neal from the La Salle University basketball scandal, would all manage to find a way to play in the NBA at some point in their future careers despite the severity of the scandals at hand.

On August 12, 2008, an anonymous user edited the Wikipedia article on the scandal, naming former player Joe Streater as an accomplice in the point-shaving, claiming he had been recruited by Kuhn alongside Sweeney. No source was given for this claim, with Streater's last appearance for the team occurring in the 1977–78 season, but the claim remained for more than five years, resulting in a number of media sites including Bleacher Report, ESPN and Yahoo News erroneously naming him as a point-shaver.

In 2014, the ESPN-produced 30 for 30 series debuted Playing for the Mob, the story about how the point-shaving scheme during the 1978–79 season unfolded. The documentary, narrated by Ray Liotta (who portrayed Hill in the film Goodfellas), was set up so that the viewer needed to watch Goodfellas beforehand to understand many of the references in the story.

Rick Kuhn died December 22, 2024, at his home in Pennsylvania. He was 69, and suffered from pancreatic cancer.
