= William Bentvena =

American mobster (1933–1970)

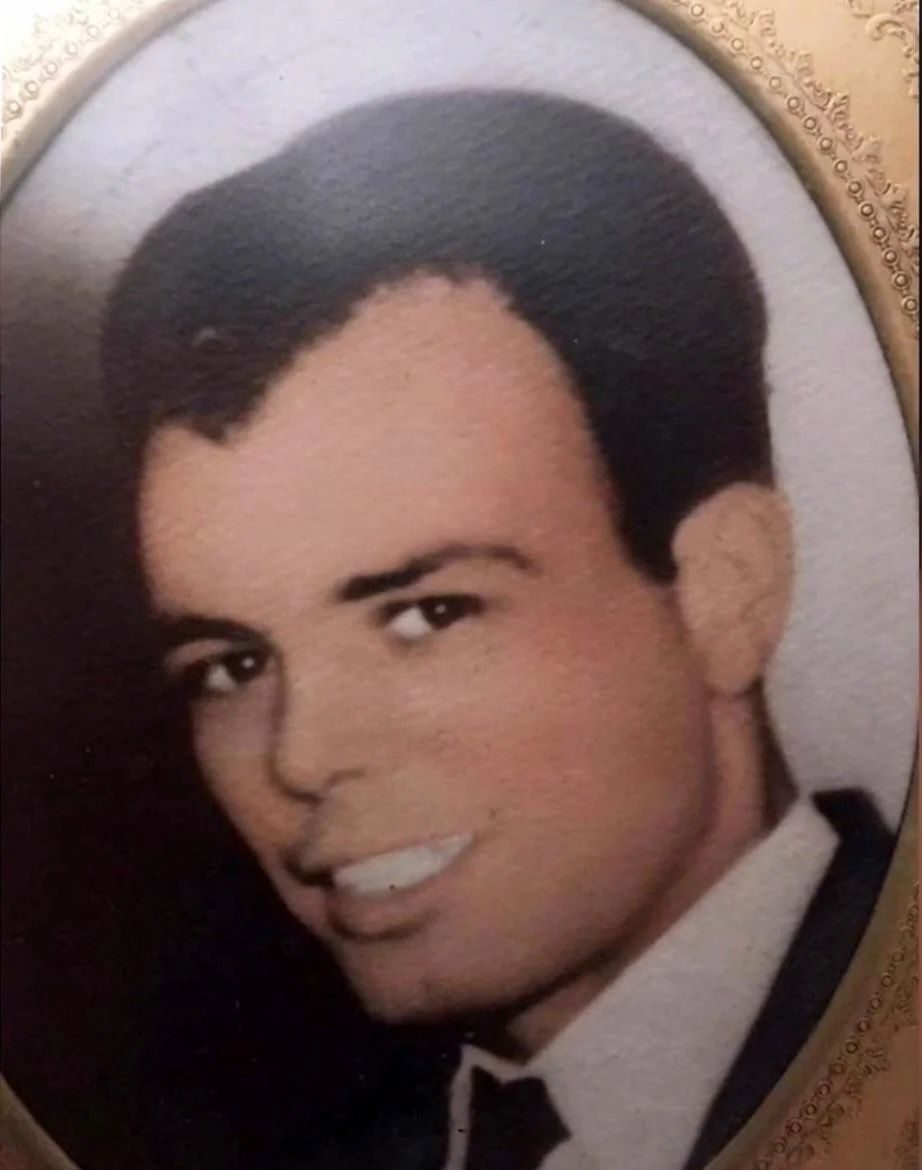
- Bentvena in the 1950s
- Born: William Joseph Bentvena; February 22, 1933; New York City, U.S.
- Died: June 11, 1970 (aged 37); New York City, U.S.
- Cause of death: Blunt force trauma
- Other name: Billy Batts
- Occupation: Mobster
- Spouse: Patricia McGovern (m. 1958)
- Children: 4
- Status: Deceased
- Allegiance: Gambino crime family
- Conviction: Narcotics trafficking
- Penalty: 15 years' imprisonment

William Joseph Bentvena (February 22, 1933 – June 11, 1970), also known as “Billy Batts”, was an American mobster with the Gambino crime family who was a longtime friend of John Gotti in the 1960s. After spending six years in prison for narcotics trafficking, Bentvena was murdered by Lucchese crime family associate Tommy DeSimone, with the help of fellow Lucchese associates James Burke and Henry Hill.

== Life ==
Bentvena was born in Manhattan as the second of four children of a first generation Sicilian Italian-American father and an Irish immigrant mother. Little is known about his early life other than that he grew up in the same area in Brooklyn as DeSimone and Hill. By 1940, Bentvena and his family had moved to the Arverne, Queens.

In September 1958, Bentvena married Queens-born Patricia McGovern in Union City, New Jersey, and would have four children together.

In May 1958, Bentvena became a member of what would become known as the Ormento Group, a heroin smuggling ring (named after John Ormento, a capo in the Lucchese crime family, the "CEO" of the group); "Managing Directors" were Carmine Galante and Anthony Mirra. On February 14, 1959, Bentvena went to Bridgeport, Connecticut, to complete a drug deal for Joseph "Joe The Crow" DelVecchio and Oreste "Ernie Boy" Abbamonte. When he arrived in Bridgeport, undercover police arrested Bentvena and charged him with possession and exchange of narcotics. Bentvena was later convicted of heroin smuggling in June 1962 alongside co-defendant Galante and sentenced to 15 years in the Federal Correctional Institution in Danbury, Connecticut.

== Murder ==
After his release in 1970, according to the mafia memoir Wiseguy, Henry Hill describes the "welcome home" party for Bentvena at Robert's Lounge, a nightclub owned by James Burke. Bentvena jokingly asked Tommy DeSimone "if he still shined shoes", which DeSimone perceived as an insult, leaning over to Hill and Burke to say, "I'm gonna kill that fuck." Two weeks later, on June 11, 1970, Bentvena was at The Suite, Hill's nightclub in Jamaica, Queens. With the club nearly empty, DeSimone pistol-whipped Bentvena, yelling, "Shine these fucking shoes!" before beating him bloody. After Bentvena was severely beaten and presumed dead, DeSimone, Burke, and Hill placed him in the trunk of Hill's car, stopping at DeSimone's mother's house for a knife, lime, and a shovel. Hearing sounds from the trunk, they realized that Bentvena was still alive, so DeSimone and Burke beat him to death with the shovel and a tire iron. Burke had a friend who owned a dog kennel in Upstate New York, and Bentvena was buried there. At the time of his murder in 1970, Bentvena was 37 years old and a respected and feared soldier in the Gambino crime family.

== Aftermath ==
About three months after Bentvena's murder, Burke's friend sold the dog kennel to housing developers, so Burke ordered Hill and DeSimone to exhume Bentvena's corpse and dispose of it elsewhere. In Wiseguy, Hill said the body was eventually crushed in a mechanical compactor at a New Jersey junkyard, owned by Clyde Brooks. On the commentary for the film Goodfellas, he additionally states that Bentvena's body was first buried in the basement of Robert's Lounge, a bar and restaurant owned by Burke, and was at a later time indeed crushed in the compactor.

On January 14, 1979, DeSimone disappeared. Henry Hill revealed that the Gambino family ordered the death of DeSimone, a mob associate with the Lucchese Crime Family – with the permission of Paul Vario – for his role in the unsanctioned murder of Bentvena and Ronald "Foxy" Jerothe. Alternatively, FBI intelligence and mob historians suggest that the Gambino family did not know about the Bentvena murder and that Gambino captain John Gotti may have just wanted revenge for DeSimone's murder of Jerothe, another Gambino associate and good friend of Gotti's.

In 1980, facing a lengthy sentence for cocaine trafficking, Hill turned state's evidence and testified at the trials of both James Burke and Paul Vario. Charges were also being prepared against Burke for the murder of Bentvena. However, they did not stand legal scrutiny, as Hill claimed to be both the sole living witness as well as an accomplice.

The events of the 1970 murder of Batts (Bentvena) are featured in the 1990 Martin Scorsese film Goodfellas. In a scene, which has been described as "iconic", Batts (portrayed by Frank Vincent) has a frank exchange with Tommy DeVito (played by Joe Pesci, based on Tommy DeSimone) at his welcome home party. The insult by Batts to DeVito – "Now go home and get your fucking shine box!" – has become one of the most memorable lines in cinema history.

Bentvena's widow, Patricia (who had then remarried), died on September 5, 2009.
