= Thomas DeSimone =

American mobster (1946–d.1979)

- DeSimone in 1979
- Born: June 6, 1946; New York City, New York, U.S.
- Disappeared: January 14, 1979 (aged 32); New York City, New York, U.S.
- Status: Missing for 47 years, 9 months and 25 days
- Other names: "Two-Gun Tommy"; "Tommy D"; "Animal"; "Spitshine Tommy"
- Occupation: Mobster
- Allegiance: Lucchese crime family

Thomas James DeSimone (June 6, 1946 – disappeared January 14, 1979) was an American criminal associated with New York City's Lucchese crime family who is alleged to have participated in both the Air France robbery and the Lufthansa heist. It is believed DeSimone was responsible for participating in at least 5 murders, from William "Billy Batts" Bentvena in 1970, Michael "Spider" Gianco in 1970, William Reckhow in 1970, Ronald "Foxy" Jerothe in 1974, and Parnell "Stacks" Edwards in 1978. DeSimone went missing in 1979 and is believed to have been murdered, as a result of the murder of Bentvena in June 1970. DeSimone had not been given permission from the Lucchese family or the American Mafia Commission to murder Bentvena as he was a formally inducted member of the Gambino family, and was subsequently murdered as the disposition of this sequence.

DeSimone's career in the Lucchese family is explored in the book Wiseguy by Nicholas Pileggi, and inspired the character of Tommy DeVito, portrayed by Joe Pesci, one of the main characters of the 1990 film Goodfellas.

== Early life ==
DeSimone was born in New York City, in the South Ozone Park area in the borough of Queens, on June 6, 1946, the youngest of eight children born to Robert Anthony DeSimone and Camilla Passerelli. He had four elder sisters and three elder brothers. Two of his brothers were associates of the Gambino crime family; Anthony was murdered by mobster Thomas Agro in 1979. One of his sisters Phyllis was a mistress of James Burke from the time she was aged 16. DeSimone was also the brother-in-law of mobster Joseph "The Barber" Spione, who was slain for refusing to help kill DeSimone in the late 1970s.

In 1965, when he was aged 19, DeSimone was introduced to Paul Vario, a caporegime in the Lucchese crime family. Henry Hill, a Vario associate who was in his early 20s at the time, later recounted his first meeting with DeSimone, describing him as "a skinny kid who was wearing a wiseguy suit and a pencil mustache." DeSimone worked under Vario, Burke and Hill, among others, becoming involved in truck hijackings, fencing stolen property, extortion, fraud, and murder. While hijacking, DeSimone would always carry his gun in a brown paper bag. "Walking down the street, he looked like he was bringing you a sandwich instead of a .38", Hill said.

== Air France robbery ==
During the 1960s, Air France was the carrier of American currency that had been exchanged in Southeast Asia. The airline had contracted to return the money to the U.S. for depositing with American banks. The money was usually carried in linen bags, each containing $60,000, and the airline shipped up to $1 million a week in this manner. The money was stored in a cement-block strong room at Air France's cargo terminal at John F. Kennedy International Airport, with a round-the-clock private security guard. In 1967, Robert McMahon, an Air France employee, tipped off Burke, Hill, and DeSimone to an incoming delivery of between $400,000 and $700,000 in cash on Friday, April 7. McMahon said the best time for the actual robbery would be just before midnight when the security guard would be on his meal break.

On the day of the robbery, Hill and DeSimone drove to Kennedy airport with an empty suitcase, the largest Hill could find. At 11:40 pm, they entered the Air France cargo terminal. McMahon suggested that they should just walk in, as people often came to the terminal to pick up lost baggage. DeSimone and Hill entered the unsecured area unchallenged and unlocked the door with a duplicate key. Using a small flashlight, they found seven of the bags, which they loaded into the suitcase and left; $420,000 was taken. No alarm was raised, no shots fired, and no one was injured. The theft was not discovered until the following Monday, when a Wells Fargo truck arrived to pick up the cash to be delivered to the CNEP subsidiary French American Banking Corporation.

== Murder of William Bentvena ==
After his release from prison in 1970, according to the mafia memoir Wiseguy, Henry Hill describes the "welcome home" party for William Bentvena at Robert's Lounge, a nightclub owned by Jimmy Burke: Bentvena jokingly asked DeSimone "if he still shined shoes", which DeSimone perceived as an insult, and leaning over to Hill and Burke intoned, "I'm gonna kill that fuck." Two weeks later, on June 11, 1970, Bentvena was at The Suite, Hill's nightclub in Queens. With the club nearly empty, DeSimone pistol-whipped Bentvena, yelling, "Shine these fucking shoes!" before beating him bloody. After Bentvena was severely beaten and presumed dead, DeSimone, Burke, and Hill placed his body in the trunk of Hill's car, stopping at DeSimone's mother's house for a knife, lime, and a shovel. Hearing sounds from the trunk, they realized that Bentvena was still alive, so DeSimone and Burke beat him to death with the shovel and a tire iron. Burke had a friend who owned a dog kennel in Upstate New York, and Bentvena was buried there.

About three months after Bentvena's murder, Burke's friend sold the dog kennel to housing developers, and Burke ordered Hill and DeSimone to exhume Bentvena's corpse and dispose of it elsewhere. In Wiseguy, Hill said the body was eventually crushed in a compactor at a New Jersey junkyard that was owned by Clyde Brooks. However, on the commentary for the film Goodfellas, he states that Bentvena's body was buried in the basement of Robert's Lounge, and that it was only later put in the compactor.

== Murders of Gianco, Cersani, and Jerothe ==
DeSimone's third murder, described by Hill, was of a young man named Michael "Spider" Gianco, who was serving as a bartender at a card game. Gianco and DeSimone had an argument, after Gianco forgot DeSimone's drink, that resulted in DeSimone pulling out a handgun and shooting him in the thigh. A week later, when Gianco was again serving drinks and sporting a full leg cast, DeSimone started to goad him about his wounded leg, spurring Gianco to tell DeSimone to "go fuck [himself]". After a stunned silence, an impressed Burke, having now developed a respect for Gianco for sticking up for himself, gave him some money before jokingly teasing DeSimone, who hadn't said or done anything in retaliation, about "going soft". DeSimone lost his temper and fatally shot Gianco three times in the chest, angrily demanding of Burke if that was "good enough for [him]". Burke, furious with DeSimone, made him bury Gianco's body in the cellar by himself.

Hill stated after he witnessed this incident that he was convinced that DeSimone was a psychopath. It is believed that Gianco's body was subsequently moved because it was not found in that location. On The Howard Stern Show, Hill said that Gianco was buried next to Robert's Lounge along with other bodies.

DeSimone's fourth murder, according to Hill, occurred when he and another associate named Stanley Diamond got carried away after being asked to "rough up" a witness to a robbery. After a truck heist, a foreman had refused to allow Burke to unload the stolen cargo in his warehouse and vehemently protested because they had no union cards. Burke attempted to reason with the foreman, who stood his ground and refused to be intimidated. Burke later sent DeSimone and Diamond to the foreman's house in rural New Jersey, with instructions to "rough up" the man to ensure he would cooperate with Burke in the future. DeSimone and Diamond, angry and worked up about having to drive all the way to New Jersey, ended up beating the man to death.

DeSimone's fifth murder occurred when Burke ordered the murder of his best friend, Dominick "Remo" Cersani. Burke got suspicious about Cersani and later found out from contacts in a Queens DA's office that he was talking to the New York City Police Department (NYPD), and that they were going to arrest Burke on a truck hijacking charge. DeSimone and Burke met Cersani at Robert's Lounge and said to him, "Let's take a ride". DeSimone strangled Cersani with piano wire. Hill said in Wiseguy: "Remo put up some fight. He kicked and swung and shit all over himself before he died." Burke had Cersani's body buried next to the bocce court behind Robert's Lounge.

On December 18, 1974, DeSimone killed Ronald Jerothe, a protégé of then-Gambino associate John Gotti. DeSimone had dated Jerothe's sister and had beaten her up, prompting Jerothe to threaten to kill him. When DeSimone heard about the threat, he went to Jerothe's apartment and killed him.

== Lufthansa heist and Edwards murder ==
On December 11, 1978, an estimated $5.875 million (equivalent to $29 million in 2025) was stolen from the Lufthansa cargo terminal at Kennedy airport, with $5 million in cash and $875,000 in jewelry, making it the largest cash robbery committed on U.S. soil at the time. Burke decided on DeSimone, McMahon, Angelo Sepe, Louis Cafora, Joe Manri, and Paolo LiCastri as the robbers. Burke's son Frank would drive one of the back-up vehicles while Parnell "Stacks" Edwards, a musician and career criminal, was given the task of disposing of the getaway van afterwards.

After the heist, Edwards was instructed to drive the vehicle to New Jersey, where it (along with any potential evidence inside) was to be destroyed in a junkyard belonging to Gotti. Instead, Edwards parked the van in front of a fire hydrant at his girlfriend's apartment, where police discovered it two days after the heist. The plates were stolen and the police impounded the van. They soon found Stacks’ fingerprints and connected it to the robbery. Vario subsequently ordered DeSimone to kill Edwards. Once he found out where Edwards was hiding, DeSimone and Sepe visited Edwards and shot him five times in the head.

== Disappearance ==
On January 14, 1979, DeSimone's wife, Angela, reported him missing. She said she had last seen DeSimone a few weeks earlier when he borrowed $60 from her. It is believed that DeSimone was murdered as revenge for the two unsanctioned murders of John Gotti's men, Bentvena and Jerothe. Another theory is that DeSimone eventually became suspected of being a police informant and was killed by Jimmy Burke.

When Hill became an FBI informant in 1980, he told authorities that DeSimone had been murdered by the Gambino family. Despite the oft-given date of death of January 14, 1979, the exact date of DeSimone's murder is uncertain. Hill claimed that in "the week after Christmas", he and Burke had gone to Florida to straighten out a drug deal gone bad. DeSimone had remained behind in New York, having been told in late December 1978 or early January 1979 that he was going to be made. Peter Vario (Paul Vario's son) and Bruno Facciolo took him to an unknown location, where he was murdered. Hill also indicated in both the book Wiseguy and the DVD commentary to Goodfellas that DeSimone had already been killed when Martin Krugman disappeared on January 6, 1979. In 1994, Hill, in his book Gangsters and Goodfellas, gave an expanded story of the events leading up to DeSimone's death, which was in part due to DeSimone's attempted rape of Hill's wife, Karen.

Two theories about DeSimone's alleged murderers exist from mob insiders. According to mob informant Joseph "Joe Dogs" Iannuzzi, Thomas Agro claimed in 1985 that he had murdered DeSimone, as well as his brother Anthony after he turned informant. Agro also suggested murdering the eldest and last remaining brother, Robert. According to Ianuzzi, Agro would often laughingly refer to killing the third DeSimone brother, stating: "Maybe it's time to go for the DeSimone trifecta!" Another account, told by Hill in Gangsters and Goodfellas, states that Gotti himself was the assassin, although in the presence of Agro. On May 17, 2007, episode of The Howard Stern Show, Hill reaffirmed that Gotti had killed DeSimone. He also added that the death "took a long time", as Bentvena had been a personal friend of Gotti's, and he wanted DeSimone to suffer before he died. Gotti's role as the assassin was repeated in the 2015 book The Lufthansa Heist, co-written by Hill and journalist Daniel Simone, although this account claims that DeSimone's death was instantaneous from three gunshots to the head. According to Sal Polisi, DeSimone was killed by Agro (in the presence of Gotti), and Agro slowly tortured him to death.

It has been theorized DeSimone is buried in The Hole, a suspected "Mafia graveyard" on the Brooklyn-Queens border near Kennedy airport, where the body of Al Indelicato was found in 1981 and where the bodies of Philip Giaccone and Dominick Trinchera were recovered by police in 2004.

== Portrayal in film ==
DeSimone was portrayed by Joseph D'Onofrio and Joe Pesci in the 1990 movie Goodfellas, renamed Tommy DeVito. Pesci won the Academy Award for Best Supporting Actor for his depiction.

Award winning actor Arsi Nami also portrays DeSimone in Stories of the American Mafia streaming on Fox Nation, Apple TV and Amazon Prime Video October 5, 2026.

== See also ==
- List of people who disappeared mysteriously: post-1970
