= Lufthansa heist =

1978 cash robbery at John F. Kennedy International Airport, New York City, US

- Date: December 11, 1978
- Time: 3:00 to 4:30 a.m. (EST, UTC−5)
- Venue: Lufthansa cargo building 261; John F. Kennedy International Airport
- Location: New York City, New York, U.S.; 40.662°N 73.787°W
- Outcome: $5 million in cash and $875,000 in jewelry stolen
- Accused: James Burke; Louis Werner; Thomas DeSimone; Angelo Sepe; Joseph M. Costa; Louis Cafora; Paolo LiCastri; Joe "Buddha" Manri; Martin Krugman; Vincent Asaro; Robert McMahon
- Verdict: Louis Werner convicted Vincent Asaro acquitted
- Convictions: 1

The Lufthansa heist was a robbery which took place at John F. Kennedy International Airport in New York City, New York, United States, on December 11, 1978. An estimated US$5.875 million (equivalent to $29 million in 2025) was stolen, with $5 million in cash and $875,000 in jewelry, making it the largest cash robbery committed in U.S. history at the time.

James Burke, an associate of the Lucchese crime family, was reputed to be the mastermind of the heist, but was never officially charged in connection with the crime. Burke is also alleged to have either committed or ordered the murders of many co-conspirators in the heist, both to avoid being implicated and to keep their shares of the money for himself. The only person convicted in the heist was Louis Werner, an airport worker involved with the planning.

The money and jewelry have never been recovered. The heist's magnitude made it one of the longest-investigated crimes in U.S. history; the latest arrest associated with the robbery was made in 2014, which resulted in acquittal.

== Planning ==
The Lufthansa heist was allegedly planned by James Burke, an associate of the Lucchese crime family of New York City, and was carried out by several associates. The plot began when bookmaker Martin Krugman told one of Burke's associates, Henry Hill, that the West German airline Lufthansa flew in currency to its cargo terminal at John F. Kennedy International Airport. The information had originally come from Louis Werner, an airport worker who owed Krugman $20,000 for gambling debts (equivalent to $106,000 in 2025), and from his co-worker Peter Gruenwald. Werner and Gruenwald had previously been successful in stealing $22,000 in foreign currency (equivalent to $124,000 in 2025) from Lufthansa in 1976.

Burke selected Tommy DeSimone, Angelo Sepe, Louis Cafora, Joe Manri, Paolo LiCastri and Robert McMahon to carry out the heist. Burke's son Frank would drive one of the backup vehicles, while Parnell "Stacks" Edwards was tasked with disposing of the van afterwards. Depending on his role in the robbery, each participant was to receive cuts of between $10,000 to $50,000. However, those amounts were based on the estimated $2 million haul, compared to the actual take of $5.875 million. Werner was to receive a flat 10% of the take.

== Heist ==
On Monday, December 11, 1978, at around 3:00 a.m. EST (UTC−5), a black Ford Econoline van carrying the six members of the robbery crew pulled up to Building 261, Lufthansa's cargo terminal at Kennedy Airport. After cutting the padlock at the gate with a pair of bolt cutters, some of the crew climbed up the stairs of the east tower and entered wearing ski masks and gloves.

Inside the terminal, John Murray, a senior cargo agent, was the first Lufthansa employee to be taken hostage. He was escorted into the lunchroom where five other employees had been on their meal break since 3:00 a.m. and ordered to lie flat on the floor with their eyes closed. Murray was asked who else was in the warehouse. He replied that Rudi Eirich, the night shift cargo traffic manager, and Kerry Whalen, a cargo transfer agent, were present. Murray was forced to lure Eirich upstairs; he joined the rest of the captured employees.

Outside the terminal, Whalen noticed two unmasked men sitting in a black van parked at the loading ramp as he drove past. When he approached the van on foot, one of the men instructed him to get in. Whalen attempted to run and screamed for help but was pistol-whipped and thrown into the van. He was brought inside the building to join the other hostages in the lunchroom.

Meanwhile, inside the warehouse, employee Rolf Rebmann heard a noise by the loading ramp and went to investigate; he was captured and brought with Whalen to the lunchroom to join the others. Some of the robbers took Eirich at gunpoint to the double-door vault. They removed 72 fifteen-pound (6.8 kg) cartons of untraceable money from the vault and placed them inside the van.

At 4:21 a.m., the van pulled to the front of the building and the crew's crash car, a Buick, pulled in behind. Two gunmen climbed into the van as the others climbed into the car. The employees were told not to call the Port Authority Police until 4:30 a.m., when the first emergency call was recorded. The robbers drove to meet Burke at an auto repair shop in Canarsie, Brooklyn, where the boxes of money were removed from the van and placed in the trunks of two automobiles. Burke and his son drove off in one car. Four others – Manri, McMahon, DeSimone, and Sepe – drove away in the second car.

== Aftermath ==
=== Investigation ===
Edwards was instructed to drive the van to New Jersey, where it (along with any potential evidence inside) was to be destroyed in a junk yard belonging to John Gotti, then a captain in the Gambino crime family. Instead, Edwards parked the van in front of a fire hydrant at his girlfriend's apartment, where police discovered it two days after the heist. The plates were found to be stolen and the van was impounded. They soon found Edwards' fingerprints and connected the van to the heist. Lucchese captain Paul Vario subsequently ordered DeSimone to kill Edwards. Once they found out where Edwards was hiding, DeSimone and Sepe went to his hideout and shot him five times in the head.

Within three days of the robbery, the Federal Bureau of Investigation (FBI) identified the Burke crew as the likely perpetrators, largely due to the discovery of the van, coupled with Edwards' pre-established connections with the crew's hangout at Robert's Lounge in South Ozone Park, Queens. FBI agents set up heavy surveillance, following the crew in helicopters and bugging their vehicles, the phones at Robert's Lounge and even the payphones nearest to the bar. The FBI managed to record a few bits of tantalizing chatter despite background noise, such as Sepe telling an unidentified man about "a brown case and a bag from Lufthansa" and his telling his girlfriend, "... I want to see... look where the money's at... dig a hole in the cellar [inaudible] rear lawn..." However, this was not enough to definitively connect the crew to the heist, and no search warrants were issued.

According to Hill, Burke became paranoid once he realized how much attention Edwards' failure had drawn and resolved to kill anyone who could implicate him in the heist. With the murders of most of the heist's participants and planners, little evidence and few witnesses remained connecting Burke or his crew to the crime. However, authorities were eventually able to gather enough evidence to prosecute Werner for helping to plan the heist. Werner was the only man convicted of the robbery, in 1979, and was sentenced to fifteen years in prison.

When Whalen was interviewed by the authorities, he was shown police archive photos and positively identified one of his assailants as Sepe. Eirich later reported that the robbers were well-informed and knew all about the safety systems in the vault, including the double-door system, whereby one door must be shut in order for the other one to be opened without activating the alarm. The robbers ordered Eirich to open up the first door to a ten-by-twenty-foot room. They knew that if he opened the second door, he would activate an alarm to the Port Authority Police unit at the airport.

Vincent Asaro, a captain in the Bonanno crime family, was arrested on January 23, 2014, in conjunction with an indictment charging him with involvement in the heist; his cousin, Gaspare Valenti, testified against him. The case against Asaro was based on information given in part by former Bonnano boss Joseph Massino, who was referred to by Asaro's attorney as "one of the worst witnesses I've ever seen." On November 12, 2015, Asaro was acquitted of all charges connected to the heist by a jury in Brooklyn.

The stolen cash and jewelry have never been recovered.

=== Murders of heist associates ===
Burke also realized that Edwards' failure to dispose of the van led police to his crew, and he resolved to kill anyone who could implicate him in the heist. The first to be murdered, just seven days after the heist, was Edwards himself—shot and killed in his apartment on December 18 by DeSimone and Sepe. This was the first in a series of co-conspirators and their acquaintances who were murdered at Burke's orders.

Victim	Date	Details
Parnell Steven "Stacks" Edwards	December 18, 1978	Blues musician, credit card thief and getaway van driver. Shot by DeSimone and Sepe for failing to dispose of the van, thus pointing the authorities to the Burke crew, and out of concern that he would inform if captured.
Martin Krugman	January 6, 1979	An associate of Burke and Hill's, and owner of a wig shop and men's hair salon, both named "For Men Only", in Queens. Krugman was the first to tip off Burke (via Hill) about the potential for a major heist at the Lufthansa terminal. He was eventually murdered and dismembered by Burke and Sepe in Asaro's fence factory, after his increasingly nervous and angry demands for his $500,000 cut from the heist convinced Burke that he was about to inform the FBI. His body was never found, and in 1986 he was declared legally dead. His wife, Fran, received a $135,000 payout from his life insurance policy.
Richard Eaton	January 17, 1979	Florida-based con artist and associate of Tom Monteleone. He was uninvolved with the actual heist, but was tortured and murdered by Burke after absconding with $250,000 of his money in a fake cocaine scam, and skimming some of the take while it was laundered through various legitimate establishments, including Monteleone's club. Eaton's body was discovered hogtied and hanging in a meat freezer truck. Burke was eventually convicted of Eaton's murder in 1985 and sentenced to 20 years in prison.
Tom Monteleone	March 1979	Florida-based restaurateur, mobster and associate of Eaton's. Monteleone owned The Players Club, a local bar frequented by Burke gang members, and was accused by Burke of conspiring with Eaton and Ferrara on a fake cocaine deal and skimming off part of the take while laundering it through his club.
Louis Cafora	March 1979	Brooklyn parking lot owner and money launderer. Cafora had been Burke's cellmate in prison and was contracted by Burke to launder some of the take through his collection of legitimate lots. Cafora's indiscreet, gaudy lifestyle and insistence on informing his wife Joanna about mob business, including the heist, eventually led to Burke's ordering both to be murdered. Within days of the heist and against Burke's orders, Cafora bought his wife a custom pink Cadillac Fleetwood Brougham with his cut of the money and brazenly drove it to a meeting just blocks from Kennedy Airport, where the FBI was still investigating the heist. His body was never found.
Joanna Cafora	March 1979	Louis Cafora's wife, presumably murdered along with him.
Joe "Buddha" Manri	May 15, 1979	Night-shift Air France cargo supervisor. Manri was a long-time Burke associate, and his inside information helped plan the heist. Manri was repeatedly offered the opportunity to turn state's evidence and enter the Witness Protection Program, as was fellow airport worker Robert McMahon, an offer which both refused. Manri was found dead in a parked car alongside McMahon, five months after the heist, shot execution-style in the back of the head.
Robert McMahon	May 16, 1979	Air France night-shift supervisor at Kennedy Airport, involved in the similar Air France robbery in 1967 with Burke associate Henry Hill. Suspected of helping Manri plan the Lufthansa heist. He was found dead in a parked car alongside Manri five months after the heist, shot execution-style in the back of the head.
Paolo LiCastri	June 13, 1979	Illegal immigrant, Sicilian-born Pizza Connection drug trafficker and Gambino crime family associate. He was not involved in the actual heist but was a liaison from the Gambino family whose job was to oversee the plans and ensure that the Gambinos received their $200,000 cut. His naked and bullet-riddled corpse was discovered on a burning trash heap six months after the heist.

Others involved in the planning, execution, or followup of the heist were also killed in 1979, but not on Burke's orders:

Victim	Date	Details
Thomas DeSimone	January 14, 1979	Was involved in the similar Air France robbery in 1967 with Burke associate Henry Hill. DeSimone disappeared on January 14, 1979, and is presumed murdered for having carried out the unrelated murders of two Gambino family members: made man William "Billy Batts" Bentvena and associate Ronald "Foxy" Jerothe.
Theresa Ferrara	February 10, 1979	Occasional mistress of DeSimone's and associate of both Eaton and Monteleone. Ferrera disappeared February 10, 1979; her dismembered torso was found floating in Barnegat Inlet, near Toms River, New Jersey, on May 18.
Angelo Sepe	July 18, 1984	Lucchese family member and a close associate of Burke, DeSimone and Tony Rodriguez. Sepe was responsible for most of the post-heist murders. Sepe and his girlfriend were themselves murdered by unknown members of a Lucchese hit squad, reportedly a week after robbing a Lucchese-affiliated drug trafficker of thousands of dollars in cocaine and cash earmarked for the family.
Joanne Lombardo	July 18, 1984	Sepe's 19-year-old girlfriend. Shot once in the mouth.
Frank Burke	May 18, 1987	Son of Jimmy Burke and believed to be involved in the heist; he was murdered by his drug dealer over a botched heroin deal.

== Informants ==
- Janet Barbieri, Louis Werner's girlfriend and future wife, who testified against Werner before a grand jury.
- William Fischetti, a taxi dispatch company owner and a mob relative who was involved in selling stolen bearer bonds.
- Peter Gruenwald, a Lufthansa heist organizer, who testified against his friend and fellow co-worker Louis Werner.
- Frank Menna, a numbers-runner who had been worked over by Sepe and Daniel Rizzo because of his boss Martin Krugman's incompetence.
- Louis Werner, a Manhattan accountant who doubled as a money launderer.
- Henry Hill, a Lucchese Family associate. In April 1980, Hill was arrested on unrelated narcotics charges. He became convinced that his former associates planned to have him killed: Vario, for dealing drugs; and Burke, to prevent Hill from implicating him in the Lufthansa heist. With a long sentence hanging over him, Hill agreed to become an informant and entered the Witness Protection Program with his family. He was not able to help the government obtain convictions against Vario or Burke for the heist, although both were convicted of other crimes as a result of his testimony. Vario was convicted on charges relating to defrauding the federal government for four years with a later extortion charge being added for an additional ten years. Meanwhile Burke was charged with conspiracy related to the 1978–79 Boston College basketball point-shaving scandal and later convicted of the murder of drug dealer Richard Eaton on Hill's testimony.

== Adaptations ==
The Lufthansa heist is the main subject of two well-known television films – The 10 Million Dollar Getaway (1991) and The Big Heist (2001) – and is a key plot element in the film Goodfellas (1990).

== See also ==
- List of large value US robberies
- Toronto Pearson International Airport heist, a 2023 grand theft at an Air Canada Cargo terminal
