= Henry Hill =

American mobster (1943–2012)

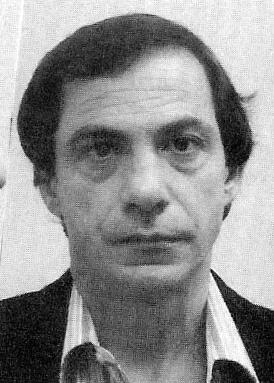
- FBI mugshot of Hill taken in 1980
- Born: June 11, 1943; New York City, New York, U.S.
- Died: June 12, 2012 (aged 69); Los Angeles, California, U.S.
- Other name: Alex Canclini
- Occupation: Mobster
- Spouse(s): Karen Friedman (1965–1989; divorce finalized in 2002) Kelly Alor (m. 1990; div. 1996)
- Children: 4
- Status: Deceased
- Allegiance: Lucchese crime family
- Convictions: Extortion (1972); Attempted methamphetamine possession (2005)
- Penalty: 10 years' imprisonment 180 days' imprisonment
- Accomplice: Lisa Caserta (2006–2012; engaged)
- Military career
- Allegiance: United States
- Branch: United States Army
- Service years: 1960–1963
- Unit: 82nd Airborne Division

Henry Hill Jr. (June 11, 1943 – June 12, 2012) was an American mobster who was associated with the Lucchese crime family of New York City from 1955 until 1980, when he was arrested on narcotics charges and became an FBI informant. Hill testified against his former Mafia associates, resulting in fifty convictions, including those of caporegime (captain) Paul Vario and fellow associate James Burke on multiple charges. Hill subsequently entered the Witness Protection Program but was removed from the program in 1987.

Hill's life story was documented in the true crime book Wiseguy: Life in a Mafia Family (1985) by Nicholas Pileggi, and subsequently depicted in two films which were both released in 1990; the critically acclaimed Martin Scorsese gangster film GoodFellas, in which Hill was portrayed by Ray Liotta, and the Herbert Ross crime comedy My Blue Heaven, in which a character inspired by Hill was portrayed by Steve Martin. Goodfellas was adapted by Pileggi and Scorsese from Wiseguy, depicting Hill's life in the mafia, whilst My Blue Heaven is a heavily fictionalised account of his time in witness protection, written by Pileggi's wife Nora Ephron based on the couple's joint research sessions.

== Early life ==
Henry Hill Jr. was born on June 11, 1943, in the New York City borough of Manhattan to Henry Hill Sr., an Irish-American electrician, and Carmela Costa, a Sicilian immigrant. Hill recounted in the book Wiseguy that his father had emigrated from Ireland at age 12 after the death of the elder Hill's father. The family, consisting of Henry and his seven siblings, resided in Brownsville, a working-class neighborhood of Brooklyn. Hill was dyslexic and performed poorly at school.

From an early age, Hill admired the local mobsters who socialized at a dispatch cabstand across the street from his home, a group that included Paul Vario, a caporegime (captain) in the Lucchese crime family. In 1955, when he was eleven years old, Hill wandered into the cabstand looking for a part-time after-school job. In his early teens, Hill began running errands for patrons at the cabstand and Vario's other front businesses. It was in this capacity that 13-year-old Hill first met notorious hijacker and Lucchese family associate James "Jimmy the Gent" Burke in 1956. Hill served drinks and sandwiches at a card game and was dazzled by Burke's openhanded tipping: "He was sawbucking me to death. Twenty here. Twenty there. He wasn't like anyone else I had ever met."

The following year, Vario's younger brother, Vito "Tuddy" Vario, and his son, Lenny Vario, presented Hill with a highly sought-after position in a bricklayers' union. Hill would be a "no show" and put on a building contractor's construction payroll, guaranteeing him a weekly salary of $190 (equivalent to $2,180 in 2025). Hill received a portion of this salary and the rest was divided among Vario and his associates. The card also allowed Hill to facilitate the pickup of daily policy bets and loan payments to Vario from local construction sites. Once Hill had this "legitimate" job, he dropped out of high school and began working exclusively for the Varios.

Hill's first encounter with arson occurred when a rival cabstand opened just around the corner from Paul Vario's. The competing company's owner was from Alabama and new to New York City. Sometime after midnight, Tuddy and Hill drove to the rival cabstand with a drum of gasoline in the backseat of Tuddy's car. Hill smashed the cab windows and filled them with gasoline-soaked newspapers and set them on fire.

Hill was first arrested when he was aged 16; his arrest record is one of the few official documents which used his real name. Hill and Lenny, who was of the same age, had attempted to use a stolen credit card to buy snow tires for Tuddy's wife. When Hill and Lenny returned to Tuddy's, two police detectives apprehended Hill. During a rough interrogation, Hill gave his name and nothing else; Vario's attorney later facilitated his release on bail. While a suspended sentence resulted, Hill's refusal to talk earned him the respect of both Vario and Burke. Burke, in particular, saw great potential in Hill. Like Hill, Burke was of Irish ancestry and therefore ineligible to become a "made man". The Vario crew, however, were happy to have associates of any ethnicity, so long as they made money and refused to cooperate with authorities.

In June 1960, at age 17, Hill joined the United States Army, serving with the 82nd Airborne Division at Fort Bragg in North Carolina. He claimed the timing was deliberate; the FBI's investigation into the 1957 Apalachin meeting had prompted a United States Senate investigation into organized crime and its links with businesses and unions. This resulted in the publication of a list of nearly 5,000 names of members and associates of the five New York crime families. Hill searched through a partial list but could not find Vario listed among the Lucchese family.

Throughout his three-year enlistment, Hill maintained his mob contacts. He also continued to hustle: in charge of kitchen detail, he sold surplus food, loan sharked pay advances to fellow soldiers and sold tax-free cigarettes. Before his discharge, Hill spent two months in the stockade for stealing a local sheriff's car and brawling in a bar with Marines and a civilian. In 1963 he returned to New York and began the most notorious phase of his criminal career: arson, intimidation, running an organized stolen car ring, and hijacking trucks.

In 1965, Hill met his future wife, Karen Friedman, through Paul Vario, who insisted that Hill accompany his son on a double date at Frank "Frankie the Wop" Manzo's restaurant, Villa Capra. According to Friedman, the date was disastrous, and Hill stood her up at the next dinner date. Afterward, the two began going on dates at the Copacabana and other nightclubs, where Friedman was introduced to Hill's outwardly impressive lifestyle. The two later married in a large North Carolina wedding, attended by most of Hill's mob associates.

== Criminal career ==
=== Air France robbery ===
Shortly before midnight on April 6, 1967, Hill and Lucchese associate Tommy DeSimone drove to the Air France cargo terminal at John F. Kennedy International Airport with an empty suitcase, the largest Hill could find. Inside connection Robert McMahon instructed the two to just walk in, as people often came to the terminal to pick up lost baggage. DeSimone and Hill entered the unsecured area unchallenged and unlocked the door with a duplicate key. Using a small flashlight, they loaded seven bags into the suitcase and left with US$420,000 (equivalent to $4.1 million in 2025). No alarm was raised, no shots were fired and no one was injured. The theft was not discovered until the following Monday, when a Wells Fargo truck arrived to pick up the cash to be delivered to the French American Banking Corporation. Hill later believed that it was the Air France robbery that endeared him to the Mafia at large.

=== Restaurant ownership and murder of William "Billy Batts" Bentvena ===
Hill used his share of the robbery proceeds to purchase a restaurant on Queens Boulevard, called The Suite, initially aiming to run it as a legitimate business and provide distance between himself and his mob associates. However, within several months, members of Lucchese and Gambino crews, including high-ranking Gambino members who "were always there", moved into the club en masse and made it another mob hangout.

According to the book Wiseguy, after William "Billy Batts" Bentvena was released from prison in 1970, a welcome-home party was thrown for him at Robert's Lounge, which was owned by Burke. Hill stated that Bentvena saw DeSimone and jokingly asked him if he still shined shoes, which DeSimone perceived as an insult. DeSimone leaned over to Hill and Burke and said, "I'm gonna kill that fuck." Two weeks later, on June 11, 1970, Bentvena was at The Suite near closing time when he was ambushed and pistol-whipped by DeSimone. Hill said that before DeSimone started to beat Bentvena, DeSimone yelled, "Shine these fucking shoes!"

After Bentvena was beaten and presumed killed, DeSimone, Burke and Hill placed his body in the trunk of Hill's car for transport. They stopped at DeSimone's mother's house to fetch a shovel and lime. They started to hear sounds from the trunk, and when they realized that Bentvena was still alive, DeSimone and Burke stopped the car and beat him to death with the shovel and a tire iron. Burke had a friend who owned a dog kennel in Upstate New York, and Bentvena was buried there. About three months after the murder, Burke's friend sold the dog kennel to housing developers, and Burke ordered Hill and DeSimone to exhume Bentvena's corpse and dispose of it elsewhere.

In Wiseguy, Hill said the body was eventually crushed in a car crusher at a New Jersey junkyard, which was owned by Clyde Brooks. However, on the commentary for the film Goodfellas, Hill states that Bentvena's body was buried in the basement of Robert's Lounge, a bar and restaurant owned by Burke, and only later was put into the car crusher.

=== Drug business ===
In November 1972, Burke and Hill were arrested for beating Gaspar Ciaccio in Tampa, Florida. Ciaccio allegedly owed a large gambling debt to their friend, union boss Casey Rosado. They were convicted of extortion and sentenced to ten years at the United States Penitentiary, Lewisburg. Hill was imprisoned with Vario, who was serving a sentence for tax evasion, and several members of John Gotti's Gambino crew. At Lewisburg, Hill met a man from Pittsburgh who, for a fee, taught Hill how to smuggle drugs into the prison.

While Hill was in jail, his wife Karen had an affair with Vario. DeSimone attempted to rape Karen, and beat her when she resisted. It has been speculated that Vario subsequently took revenge by telling the Gambino family about DeSimone's role in Bentvena's murder; they in turn killed DeSimone.

On July 12, 1978, Hill was paroled after four years and resumed his criminal career. He began trafficking in drugs, which Burke eventually became involved with, even though the Lucchese family did not authorize any of its members to engage in such activity. Hill began wholesaling marijuana, cocaine, heroin and quaaludes based on connections he made in prison, making enormous amounts of money. However, a young child who acted as a mule of Hill's "ratted" him out to narcotics detectives Daniel Mann and William Broder. "The Youngster" (so named by the detectives) informed them that Hill was connected to the Lucchese family. Knowing of Hill's exploits, the detectives put surveillance on him. Mann and Broder had "thousands" of wiretaps of Hill, but Hill and his crew used coded language in the conversations. Hill's wiretap on March 29 is an example of the bizarre vocabulary:

Pittsburgh Connection: You know the golf club and the dogs you gave me in return?
Hill: Yeah.
Pittsburgh Connection: Can you still do that?
Hill: Same kind of golf clubs?
Pittsburgh Connection: No. No golf clubs. Can you still give me the dogs if I can pay for the golf clubs?
Hill: Yeah. Sure.
[portion of conversation omitted]
Pittsburgh Connection: You front me the shampoo and I'll front you the dog pills. ... what time tomorrow?
Hill: Anytime after twelve.
Pittsburgh Connection: You won't hold my lady friend up?
Hill: No.
Pittsburgh Connection: Somebody will just exchange dogs.

=== Lufthansa heist ===
On December 11, 1978, an estimated $5.875 million (equivalent to $29 million in 2025) was stolen from the Lufthansa cargo terminal at Kennedy airport, with $5 million in cash and $875,000 in jewelry, making it the largest cash robbery committed on American soil at the time. The plot had begun when bookmaker Martin Krugman told Hill that Lufthansa flew in currency to its cargo terminal at the airport; Burke set the plan in motion. Hill did not directly take part in the heist.

=== Basketball fixing ===
Hill and two Pittsburgh gamblers set up the 1978–79 Boston College basketball point-shaving scheme by convincing Boston College center Rick Kuhn to participate. Kuhn, who was a high school friend of one of the gamblers, encouraged teammates to participate in the scheme.

Hill also claimed to have an NBA referee in his pocket who worked games at Madison Square Garden during the 1970s. The referee had incurred gambling debts on horse races.

== As an informant ==
=== 1980 arrest ===
In 1980, Hill was arrested on a narcotics-trafficking charge. He became convinced that his former associates planned to have him killed: Vario, for dealing drugs; and Burke, to prevent Hill from implicating him in the Lufthansa heist. Hill heard on a wiretap that his associates Angelo Sepe and Anthony Stabile were anxious to have him killed, and that they were telling Burke that Hill "is no good" and "is a junkie". Burke told them "not to worry about it". Hill was more convinced by a surveillance tape played to him by federal investigators, in which Burke tells Vario of their need to have Hill "whacked".

When Hill was finally released on bail, Burke told him they should meet at a bar, which Hill had never heard of or seen before, owned by "Charlie the Jap". However, Hill never met Burke there; instead they met at Burke's sweatshop with Karen and asked for the address in Florida where Hill was to kill Bobby Germaine's son with Anthony Stabile. Hill knew he would be murdered if he went to Florida.

Edward A. McDonald, the head of the Brooklyn Organized Crime Strike Force, arrested Hill as a material witness in the Lufthansa robbery. With a long sentence hanging over him, Hill agreed to become an informant and signed an agreement with the Strike Force on May 27, 1980.

=== Informant and the witness protection program ===
Hill testified against his former associates to avoid impending prosecution and being murdered by his crew. His testimony led to 50 convictions. Hill, his wife Karen, and their two children (Gregg and Gina) entered the U.S. Marshals' Witness Protection Program in 1980, changed their names, and moved around to several undisclosed locations.

Jimmy Burke was given 12 years in prison for the 1978–79 Boston College point-shaving scandal, involving fixing Boston College basketball games. Burke was also later sentenced to life in prison for the murder of scam artist Richard Eaton. Burke died of cancer while serving his life sentence, on April 13, 1996, at the age of 64.

Paul Vario received four years for helping Henry Hill obtain a no-show job to get him paroled from prison. Vario was also later sentenced to 10 years in prison for the extortion of air freight companies at JFK Airport. He died of respiratory failure on November 22, 1988, at age 73 while incarcerated in the FCI Federal Prison in Fort Worth.

=== Hill's bigamy, subsequent arrests, and divorce ===
In the fall of 1981, Hill (now Martin Lewis) met a woman named Sherry Anders. After a whirlwind romance, the two got married in Virginia City, Nevada, despite the fact that Hill was already married. This led to a breakdown in many areas of Hill's life. In 1987, Hill was convicted of cocaine trafficking in a federal court in Seattle and expelled from the witness protection program. In 1990, his wife Karen filed for divorce after 23 years of marriage. The divorce was finalized in 2002.

In August 2004, Hill was arrested in North Platte, Nebraska, at North Platte Regional Airport after he had left his luggage containing drug paraphernalia. On September 26, 2005, he was sentenced to 180 days imprisonment for attempted methamphetamine possession.

Hill was sentenced to two years of probation on March 26, 2009, after he pleaded guilty to two misdemeanor counts of public intoxication. On December 14, 2009, he was arrested in Fairview Heights, Illinois, for disorderly conduct and resisting arrest, which Hill attributed to his drinking problems.

== Later years ==
In his later years, after his first divorce, he married Kelly Alor, and then Lisa Caserta. They lived in Topanga Canyon, near Malibu, California. Both appeared in several documentaries and made public appearances on various media programs, including The Howard Stern Show, where he would often appear in drunken condition. Hill fathered a third child during this time.

=== Goodfellas film ===
Goodfellas, the 1990 Martin Scorsese-directed crime film adaptation of the 1985 non-fiction book Wiseguy by Nicholas Pileggi, follows the 1955 to 1980 rise and fall of Hill and his Lucchese crime family associates. Hill was portrayed by Ray Liotta. Scorsese initially named the film Wise Guy but subsequently, with Pileggi's agreement, changed the name to Goodfellas to avoid confusion with the unrelated television crime drama Wiseguy. Two weeks in advance of the filming, Hill was paid $480,000. Robert De Niro, who portrayed Jimmy Conway (the film's version of Burke), often called Hill several times a day to ask how Burke walked, held his cigarette, and so on. Driving to and from the set, Liotta listened to FBI audio cassette tapes of Hill, so he could practice speaking like his real-life counterpart. The cast did not meet Hill until a few weeks before the film's premiere. Liotta met him in an undisclosed city; Hill had seen the film and told the actor that he loved it.

=== Other media appearances and activity ===
The 1990 film My Blue Heaven was based on Hill's life, with the screenplay written by Pileggi's wife Nora Ephron. The 2001 TV film The Big Heist was based on the Lufthansa heist, and Hill was portrayed by Nick Sandow.

In 2004, Hill was interviewed by Charlie Rose for 60 Minutes. Hill celebrated the film's 20th anniversary on July 24, 2010, by hosting a private screening at the Museum of the American Gangster. On June 8, 2011, a show about Hill's life aired on the National Geographic Channel's Locked Up Abroad.

In 2006, Hill and Ray Liotta appeared in a photo shoot for Entertainment Weekly. At Liotta's urging, Hill entered alcohol rehabilitation two days after the session shoot.

In reference to his many victims, Hill stated in an interview in March 2008 with the BBC's Heather Alexander: "I don't give a heck what those people think; I'm doing the right thing now," addressing the reporter's question about how his victims might think of his commercialization of his story through self-written books and advising on Goodfellas.

In 2008, Hill was featured in episode three of the crime documentary series The Irish Mob. In the episode, Hill recounts his life of crime, as well as his close relationship with Jimmy Burke and the illegal activity the two engaged in together. A large portion of the segment focuses on Burke's and Hill's involvements in the famous Lufthansa heist.

In August 2011, Hill appeared in the special "Mob Week" on AMC; he and other former mob members talked about The Godfather, Goodfellas, and other such mob films.

In 2014, the ESPN-produced 30 for 30 series debuted Playing for the Mob, the story about how Hill and his Pittsburgh associates, and several Boston College basketball players, committed the point-shaving scandal during the 1978–79 season, an episode briefly mentioned in the movie. The documentary, narrated by Liotta, was set up so that the viewer needed to watch the film beforehand to understand many of the references in the story.

=== Books ===
In October 2002, Hill published The Wiseguy Cookbook: My Favorite Recipes from My Life as a Goodfella to Cooking on the Run. In it, Hill shared some stories throughout his childhood, life in the mob, and running from the law. He also presents recipes he learned from his family, during his years in the mob, and some that he came up with himself. For example, Hill claimed his last meal the day he was busted for drugs consisted of rolled veal cutlets, sauce with pork butt, veal shanks, ziti, and green beans with olive oil and garlic.

In 2012, Henry Hill collaborated with the author Daniel Simone in writing and developing a non-fiction book titled The Lufthansa Heist, a portrayal of the famous 1978 Lufthansa Airline robbery at Kennedy Airport. The book was published in August 2015.

Other books by Hill include:

- Hill, Henry; Bryon Schreckengost (2003). A Goodfella's Guide to New York: Your Personal Tour Through the Mob's Notorious Haunts, Hair-Raising Crime Scenes, and Infamous Hot Spots. Three Rivers Press. ISBN 0-7615-1538-0.
- Hill, Henry; Gus Russo (2004). Gangsters and Goodfellas: Wiseguys, Witness Protection, and Life on the Run. M. Evans and Company, Inc. ISBN 1-56731-757-X.

=== Restaurants ===
Hill worked for a time as a chef at an Italian restaurant in North Platte, Nebraska, and his spaghetti sauce, Sunday Gravy, was marketed over the internet. Hill opened another restaurant, Wiseguys, in West Haven, Connecticut, in October 2007, which closed the following month after a fire.

== Death ==
Hill died of complications related to heart disease in a Los Angeles hospital, on June 12, 2012, after a long battle with his illness, a day after his 69th birthday. His girlfriend for the last six years of his life, Lisa Caserta, said, "He had been sick for a long time. ... his heart gave out".

CBS News aired Caserta's report of Hill's death, during which she stated: "He went out pretty peacefully, for a goodfella." She said Hill had recently had a heart attack before his death and died of complications after a long history of heart problems associated with smoking. Hill's family was present when he died. Hill was cremated the day after his death.
