= James Burke (gangster) =

American gangster (1931–1996)

- Burke's 1979 mugshot
- Born: July 5, 1931; New York City, U.S.
- Died: April 13, 1996 (aged 64); Buffalo, New York, U.S.
- Resting place: Saint Charles Cemetery, East Farmingdale, New York
- Other names: "Jimmy the Gent," "The Big Irishman"
- Occupation: Mobster
- Known for: Lufthansa heist
- Spouse: Mickey Burke (m. 1962)
- Children: 3
- Relatives: Anthony Indelicato (son-in-law)
- Allegiance: Lucchese crime family
- Convictions: Forgery (1949); Extortion (1972); Conspiracy (1982); Second degree murder (1985)
- Penalty: 10 years' imprisonment (1972); 12 years' imprisonment (1982); 20 years to life (1985)

James Burke (July 5, 1931 – April 13, 1996), also known as "Jimmy the Gent", was an American gangster and Lucchese crime family associate who is believed to have organized the 1978 Lufthansa heist, the largest cash robbery in American history at the time. He was believed to be responsible for the deaths of those involved in the months after the robbery.

Following the testimony of Henry Hill, Burke was convicted in 1982, of conspiracy charges related to his involvement in the 1978–79 Boston College basketball point-shaving scandal, and sentenced to 12 years in prison. While in prison, he was convicted of murder and sentenced to another 20 years to life. He died of cancer at the Roswell Park Cancer Institute in Buffalo, New York, twelve years before he would have been eligible for parole.

Burke inspired the character Jimmy "The Gent" Conway, one of the main characters of the 1990 film Goodfellas, played by Robert De Niro.

== Early life ==
At the age of two, Burke was placed in a foster home and was exposed to violence and sexual abuse while in the care of dozens of foster parents. At the age of 13, an altercation with his foster parents while riding in a car resulted in a crash and the death of his foster father.

In 1962, Burke married his girlfriend Mickey but discovered that she was being bothered by an ex-boyfriend. On their wedding day, police found the ex-boyfriend's remains, in over a dozen pieces, strewn around the inside of his car. He was the father of Lufthansa heist aide Frank James Burke (who was murdered in 1987), Jesse James Burke, and Catherine Burke (who married Bonanno crime family member Anthony Indelicato).

== Criminal activities ==
As Burke was of Irish descent, he was ineligible to become a "made man" in the Italian-American Mafia, so he was limited to being an associate under capo Paul Vario. During the 1950s, Burke was involved with various illegal activities, such as distributing untaxed cigarettes and liquor. Burke became a mentor to Thomas DeSimone, Henry Hill, and Angelo Sepe during the 1960s. Burke owned the South Ozone Park, Queens tavern Robert's Lounge.

In November 1972, Burke and Hill were arrested for beating Gaspar Ciaccio in Tampa, Florida. Ciaccio allegedly owed a large gambling debt to their friend, union boss Casey Rosado. They were charged with extortion, convicted, and sentenced to 10 years in the United States Penitentiary in Lewisburg. Burke was paroled after six years and resumed his criminal career, as did Hill, who was released two years prior. Both Hill and Burke began trafficking illegal narcotics, despite a ban by the Lucchese family, who feared their associates becoming informants in exchange for a lesser sentence, which is exactly what Hill did in 1980.

=== Murder of William "Billy Batts" Bentvena ===
In the book Wiseguy, Henry Hill said that after William "Billy Batts" Bentvena was released from prison in 1970, they threw a "welcome home" party for Bentvena at Robert's Lounge, which was owned by Burke. Hill stated that Bentvena saw Tommy DeSimone and jokingly asked him if he still shined shoes and DeSimone perceived it as an insult. DeSimone leaned over to Hill and Burke and said "I'm gonna kill that fuck." Two weeks later, on June 11, 1970, Bentvena was at The Suite, a nightclub owned by Hill. Late in the night, with the bar club nearly empty, DeSimone pistol-whipped Bentvena. Hill said that before DeSimone started to beat Bentvena, DeSimone yelled, "Shine these fucking shoes!"

After Bentvena was beaten and presumed killed, DeSimone, Burke, and Hill placed his body in the trunk of Hill's car for transport. They stopped at DeSimone's mother's house to get a shovel and lime. They started to hear sounds from the trunk, and when they realized that Bentvena was still alive, DeSimone and Burke stopped the car and beat him to death with the shovel and a tire iron. Burke had a friend who owned a dog kennel in Upstate New York, and Bentvena was buried there.

About three months after Bentvena's murder, Burke's friend sold the dog kennel to housing developers, and Burke ordered Hill and DeSimone to exhume Bentvena's corpse and dispose of it elsewhere. In Wiseguy, Hill said the body was eventually crushed in a mechanical compactor at a New Jersey junkyard, which was owned by Clyde Brooks. However, on the commentary for the film Goodfellas, he states that Bentvena's body was buried in the basement of Robert's Lounge, and only later was put into the car crusher.

=== Lufthansa heist ===
The Lufthansa heist was planned by Burke and carried out by several associates. The plot began when bookmaker Martin Krugman told Burke's associate Henry Hill that Lufthansa flew in currency to its cargo terminal at John F. Kennedy International Airport. The information had originally come from Louis Werner, a worker at the airport who owed Krugman $20,000 for gambling debts (equivalent to $106,000 in 2025) and from his co-worker Peter Gruenwald.

Burke decided on Tommy DeSimone, Angelo Sepe, Louis Cafora, Joe Manri, Paolo LiCastri and Robert McMahon as the robbers. Burke's son Frank would drive one of the backup vehicles and Parnell "Stacks" Edwards's job was to dispose of the van afterwards. Depending on their role in the robbery, each participant was to receive $10,000 to $50,000. However, those amounts were based on the estimated haul, which was only $2 million compared to the actual take of $5.875 million. Werner was to receive a flat 10% of the take.

On December 11, 1978, an estimated $5.875 million (equivalent to $29 million in 2025) was stolen, with $5 million in cash and $875,000 in jewelry, making it the largest cash robbery committed in the US at the time.

Burke is also alleged to have either committed or ordered the murders of many of the robbers to avoid being implicated in the heist. The first was Edwards, on December 18, after he failed to get rid of the robbery van. Burke was never implicated or charged in the robbery, and the stolen cash and jewelry were never recovered.

=== Boston College point shaving scandal ===
In 1980, Burke was arrested for a parole violation. In 1982, Burke was convicted of conspiracy and sentenced to 12 years in prison for his involvement with the 1978–79 Boston College basketball point-shaving scandal, based primarily on the testimony of former mob associate Henry Hill. Hill's testimony in federal court resulted in a total of fifty convictions in this and other cases, including those of Burke and their boss, capo Paul Vario. While Burke was serving that sentence, he was charged with the 1979 murder of drug dealer Richard Eaton. He was convicted at a trial in which Hill testified and was sentenced in 1985 to a further 20 years to life in prison.

Burke's son Frank James Burke, a cocaine dealer and associate in the Gambino crime family, was shot dead at the age of 26 by another drug dealer, Tito Ortiz, after arguing with two men outside the Suncrest Tavern on Liberty Avenue in East New York, Brooklyn on May 18, 1987.

== Death ==
Burke was serving his sentence in Wende Correctional Facility in Alden, New York, when he was diagnosed with cancer. He died on April 13, 1996, while being treated at Roswell Park Comprehensive Cancer Center in Buffalo, New York. Had he lived, he would have been eligible for parole on November 3, 2008. Burke was buried at Saint Charles Cemetery in East Farmingdale, New York.

== Aftermath ==
James Burke was portrayed by Robert De Niro in the 1990 Martin Scorsese film Goodfellas, renamed Jimmy Conway.

Burke was played by John Mahoney in the 1991 television film The 10 Million Dollar Getaway, which details the events of the Lufthansa Heist. Donald Sutherland also portrayed Burke for the 2001 television film The Big Heist.

In 2013, human remains were unearthed by the FBI and NYPD organized crime investigators at his former home. DNA testing confirmed the remains belonged to Paul Katz, a mob associate who disappeared in 1969 after Burke believed Katz was an informant to law enforcement. Katz was strangled to death with a chain.

In October 2014, Burke's involvement in the Boston College Point Shaving Scandal was discussed in the ESPN 30 for 30 episode "Playing for the Mob." Ray Liotta, who played Henry Hill in Goodfellas, is the narrator of the documentary.
