= Made man =

Fully initiated member of the Mafia

Structure of a Mafia crime family

In the Sicilian and American Mafia, a made man is a fully initiated member of the Mafia. To become eligible to be "made", an associate must fulfill several family-specific requirements. These range from being Italian (or specifically from Sicily) to being of general Italian descent and sponsored by an existing made man. An inductee will be required to take the oath of omertà, the Mafia code of silence and code of honor. After the induction ceremony, the associate becomes a "made man" and holds the rank of soldier (Italian: soldato) in the Mafia hierarchy. Made men are the only ones who can rise through the ranks of the Mafia, from soldier to caporegime, consigliere, underboss, and boss.

Other common names for members include man of honor (Italian: uomo d'onore), man of respect (Italian: uomo di rispetto), one of us (Italian: uno di noi), friend of ours (Italian: amico nostro), good fella, and wiseguy, although the last two terms can also apply to non-initiated Mafia associates who work closely with the Mafia, rather than just official "made men". Earning or making one's "bones" or "button" or becoming a "button man" for the Mafia is usually synonymous with becoming a "made man".

Other street terms for being initiated into the Mafia include being "straightened out" or "baptized", and earning one's "badge". "Opening the books" and "closing the books" are phrases used in the Mafia to indicate, respectively, that a family is ready or unwilling/unable to accept new members. In Sicily, the proper term for a member of the Sicilian Mafia is in Italian uomo d'onore, or in Sicilian omu d'onuri. Mafioso and the plural mafiosi are common terms used colloquially and by the press and academics, but are generally not used by members of the Italian-American and Sicilian Mafia themselves.

== Overview ==
Traditionally, in the American Mafia to become a made man, the inductee was required to be a male of full Sicilian descent, which was then extended to males of full Southern Italian descent, and later further extended to males of half-Italian descent through their father's lineage. For example, famous Lucchese family associate Henry Hill, portrayed in the 1990 film Goodfellas, was unable to become a made man, despite his extensive Mafia career and his mother's Sicilian descent, because his father was of Irish descent. According to Salvatore Vitale, it was decided during a Commission meeting in 2000 to restore the rule requiring both parents to be of Italian descent.

However, examples of made members who are not of full Italian descent include the son of Italian-American mobster John Gotti, John A. Gotti, whose maternal grandmother was Russian, and Frank Salemme of the New England Patriarca crime family, whose father was of Italian descent, but whose mother was of Irish descent. In other cases, partially Italian-American associates have hidden their non-Italian heritage to become made men, as in the case of Scarfo crime family soldier and made man Andrew Thomas DelGiorno, who was of Polish and Italian descent but managed to conceal his Polish heritage on his mother's side and was therefore inducted into the Philadelphia Mafia.

Historically, men of Northern Italian descent were considered unacceptable for membership in the American Mafia, because the Sicilian counterpart and other related crime groups originated in Southern Italy. Colombo family capo Gregory Scarpa was nearly denied membership into the American Cosa Nostra because his family was from the Northern Italian Veneto province. However, his money-making abilities and willingness to use violence convinced Colombo family leadership to induct him anyway.

An associate of a crime family who has worked as a law enforcement officer in any capacity, or who has even attended or applied to a law enforcement training program, usually cannot become a made member of the Mafia. For example, DeMeo crew member Henry Borelli could never become a made man in the Gambino family, since he had taken the New York City Police Department entrance exam in the early 1970s. Bonanno underboss Salvatore Vitale was only "made" because his brother-in-law and future boss Joseph Massino managed to cover up Vitale's previous work as a corrections officer.

One exception to this rule is Scarfo crime family soldier Ron Previte, who was a former (albeit corrupt) member of the Philadelphia police force. In addition, though never becoming officially made members of the Mafia, corrupt NYPD police detectives Louis Eppolito and Stephen Caracappa performed duties for the Lucchese crime family equivalent to those of a soldier or made man.

Certain individuals have also been deemed unworthy to be inducted into Cosa Nostra due to not meeting certain standards. "Mad Sam" DeStefano was a mentally unstable and sadistic loan shark who took pleasure in torture and murder. The Chicago Outfit tolerated his earning ability but never made him, because they feared that his bizarre behavior brought too much publicity. Joseph "Joe Pitts" Conigliaro, an associate of the DeCavalcante crime family who was paralyzed and reliant on a wheelchair as a result of a shooting, was ineligible to become a "made" member of the family due to his disability but was otherwise "treated ... as a made guy", according to Anthony Capo.

Often, an associate is required to carry out a contract killing in order to become eligible for induction. Traditionally, this rule was applied to prove the associate's loyalty to the Mafia. In modern times, it also serves to show that one is not an undercover law enforcement agent. According to traditional rules, any murders carried out for personal reasons cannot be used to fulfill the requirement. Committing one's first contract killing is referred to as "making one's bones" or earning one's "button", thus becoming a "button man."

As a result of the Apalachin meeting, the membership books to become a made man in the mob were thought to have been closed in 1957 and were not known to law enforcement to have been reopened until 1976, though whether this was actually the case or was an assumption due to a lack of information on the part of law enforcement and the press is unclear, as some Mafia members seem to have been made during that period.

== Induction ceremony ==
To become made, an associate would first have to be sponsored by a made man. According to Joe Pistone's accounts in his books The Way of the Wiseguy and Donnie Brasco: Unfinished Business, the associate must now have at least two sponsors, one of whom must have known him for 10 to 15 years. The sponsor knows the associate and vouches for his reliability and abilities. Although a capo or other senior members will determine the prospective member's credibility, ultimately the decision lies with the boss of the family into which he will be inducted.

When the crime family "opens the books" (accepts new members), an associate will get a call telling him to get ready and dressed. He will then be picked up and taken to the room where the ceremony will take place, alone or with other accepted candidates. An inductee will be required to take the oath of omertà, the mafia code of silence. Though the ceremony varies from family to family, it typically involves the pricking of the trigger finger of the inductee, then dripping blood onto a picture of a saint, typically St Francis of Assisi or the Virgin Mary, which is then set alight in his hand and kept burning until the inductee has sworn the oath of loyalty to his new "family", such as, "As burns this saint, so will burn my soul. I enter alive and I will have to get out dead."

== Privileges ==
After the induction ceremony, the associate becomes a made man and holds the rank of soldier (Italian: soldato) in the Mafia hierarchy. He is given responsibilities and receives benefits. A made man enjoys the full protection and backing of the Mafia establishment as long as he remains in favor and earns enough money, a percentage of which must be passed up the hierarchy. A made man is traditionally seen as "untouchable" by fellow criminals; he is to be respected and feared. To strike, let alone kill, a made man for any reason without the permission of the Mafia family leadership is punished by death, regardless of whether or not the perpetrator had a legitimate grievance.

An example of this type of retribution was discussed in the non-fiction book Wiseguy, and dramatized in the 1990 film Goodfellas, which chronicles the life of Henry Hill, who was a Lucchese crime family associate turned FBI informant. It involved the circumstances of the disappearance of Tommy DeSimone, a fellow Lucchese associate who was allegedly killed by the Gambino crime family. His offense was that he murdered made man William "Billy Batts" Bentvena who was a made member and who was a close friend to future boss John Gotti without permission. A made man can, however, be killed if a good enough reason is provided and the Mafia family's leadership grants permission.
