= Paul Vario =

American mobster (1914-1988)

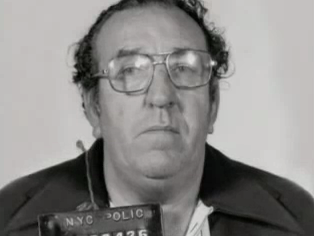
- Mug shot of Vario
- Born: July 10, 1914; New York City, New York, U.S.
- Died: May 3, 1988 (aged 73); Fort Worth, Texas, U.S.
- Resting place: St. John Cemetery, Queens, New York, U.S.
- Other name: Paulie
- Occupation: Mobster
- Spouse(s): Vita Rizzuto (first wife); Phyllis Joan Vario (second wife)
- Children: 3 Sons; Paul Jr. (June 3, 1938-August 28, 2019); Peter A. "Rugsy" (June 5, 1945-January 25, 2021); Leonard A. "Lenny" (March 21, 1946-October 6, 1973)
- Allegiance: Lucchese crime family
- Convictions: Tax evasion (1973); Fraud (1984); Extortion (1985)
- Penalty: Six years' imprisonment (1973); Four years' imprisonment and $10,000 fine (1984); 10 years' imprisonment (1985)

Paul Vario (July 10, 1914 – May 3, 1988) was an American mobster and made man in the Lucchese crime family. Vario was a caporegime and had his own crew of mobsters in Brooklyn, New York. Following the testimony of Henry Hill, Vario was convicted in 1984 of fraud and was sentenced to four years in prison, followed by a conviction for extortion in 1985 and an additional sentence of 10 years in prison. He died on May 3, 1988, of respiratory failure in prison.

He was portrayed as Paul Cicero by Paul Sorvino in the Martin Scorsese film Goodfellas.

== Early life ==
Paul Vario was born on July 10, 1914, in New York City to Pietro "Peter" Vario (1881-1957) and Mary Vario (1886-1982), immigrants from Erice in Sicily. He grew up in Brooklyn's Mill Basin section. In 1925, at age 11, Vario was sentenced to seven months in juvenile detention for truancy.

In 1937, Vario along with Anthony Romano were identified by a sixteen-year-old girl from Howard Beach who said Vario and Romano sexually assaulted her a year prior. Both men were later convicted of rape and sentenced to ten years in prison. Vario was paroled twice during his prison term but was sent back to prison for violating parole, after being arrested again and charged with burglary and dealing stolen property. He was released from prison in 1962.

In 1965, Vario separated from wife Vita (nee Rizzuto) and began living with Phyllis DeAvanzo.

Vario's four brothers Lenny, Tommy, Vito "Tuddy", and Salvatore "Babe" all joined him in organized crime. His older brother Lenny Vario was a construction union official and ex-bootlegger who had been arrested with Lucky Luciano, he served as Paul's main contact to building contractors and construction companies, he collected tribute paid in cash and no-show jobs to avoid union strikes and fires. Paul was the second born son in the Vario family, and Tommy was the third, he served as a union delegate for construction workers and he controlled bookmaking and loan-sharking operations throughout construction sites. His brother Vito "Tuddy" Vario ran the cabstand and hired young Henry Hill. The youngest brother was Salvatore "Babe" who ran floating card and dice games and paid off local cops for Paul.

Paul Vario had three sons Paul Jr., Peter A. "Rugsy", and Leonard A. "Lenny" who joined in organized crime.

== Rise to power ==
After Vario was released from prison he became a member of the Lucchese crime family. He conducted most of his criminal business from an old German bar known as Geffken's at 9508 Flatlands Avenue in central Canarsie and a junkyard at 5702 Avenue D in the vicinity of the East Flatbush/Canarsie border. Vario's junkyard is where he reportedly oversaw criminal operations that included hijackings, loansharking, bookmaking and fencing stolen property. He was quickly promoted to the caporegime rank controlling his own crew in the family. His associates were reputed to have been involved in criminal dealings at John F. Kennedy Airport, extorting money from shippers and airlines in exchange for labor peace. Vario's notable crew associates included Thomas DeSimone and Henry Hill.

During the next years Vario continued expanding his criminal operations. In 1965, mobster Jake Columbo died, and Vario quickly took control of his illegal gambling operations in the Five Towns (Cedarhurst and Inwood) section of Nassau County. In late 1965, Long Island officials arrested Vario along with eight others and charged them with controlling a gambling ring. Vario was charged with not providing a federal gambling stamp in a Brooklyn federal court in February 1966. Months later, in June 1966, Nassau County officials arrested Vario and seventeen others and charged them with running a bookmaking operation.

Vario was also involved in legitimate businesses that included a flower shop, a bar, a restaurant, and a taxi stand. One of his businesses, Vario's Bargain Auto Parts Inc., located at the junkyard, is where Vario conducted illegal business with his associates. At his height, Vario was earning an estimated $25,000 a day from his illegal activities (equivalent to $150,000 in 2025). According to Hill, Vario once told him that he had stashed $1 million in a single vault. During this period, Vario also served as an unofficial consigliere to Lucchese boss Carmine Tramunti.

Vario allegedly had a very violent temper. One night, Vario took his wife, Phyllis, out to dinner. While they were sitting at the table, the maître d'hôtel accidentally poured wine on Phyllis' dress, then tried to dry it with a dirty rag. An enraged Vario hit the maitre d'hôtel twice. Later that night, Vario sent two carloads of men armed with pipes and baseball bats to assault the waiters after the restaurant had closed.

== Prosecution and prison ==
In 1970, Vario was cited for contempt of court and was sent to the Nassau County Correctional Facility on Long Island for seven months.

In 1971, the Geffken family sold the Geffken's bar and property to Paul Vario's friend Peter Abinanti for $40,000.

On April 7, 1972, law enforcement placed an electronic listening device inside Vario's trailer at the Brooklyn junkyard and started gathering evidence against him. In addition, a police detective wearing a listening device started visiting the trailer. Vario was convinced the policeman was corrupt and soon started offering him bribes. The entire surveillance operation lasted about six months.

In October 1972, police raided the Brooklyn junkyard. On November 1, 1972, Vario was indicted on charges of tampering with a witness. He had allegedly advised Frank Heitman, a convicted gambler, to flee to Florida to avoid testifying to a grand jury in Nassau County. To arrest Vario, police had to chase his car for 20 minutes through the streets of Brooklyn before he finally stopped for them. On November 21, 1972, Vario was indicted on insurance fraud charges. He and several co-conspirators had stripped a boat of its equipment, sunk it, and then filed a $7,000 insurance claim. On December 7, 1972, Vario was indicted on charges that included attempting to bribe the officer at the trailer. Also in December 1972, Vario pleaded guilty to drunken driving and received probation. However, Vario violated probation in early 1973 and was in jail by February 1973.

On February 9, 1973, Vario was convicted on tax evasion charges. On April 6, 1973, Vario was sentenced to six years in federal prison for the tax evasion conviction.

Vario was sent to the federal prison located in Lewisburg, Pennsylvania. While in prison, Vario was part of the infamous "Mafia row" of prisoners.

On 5 October 1973, Paul Vario’s son, Leonard Vario, died at Wyckoff Heights Medical Center in Brooklyn of severe burns he suffered on July 20, 1973. The cause of his injuries was never discovered. At his funeral, two television cameramen and a police detective were beaten by the mourners.

== Release from prison ==
In 1975, Vario was released from federal prison. He had served as underboss in the Lucchese crime family until the new boss Anthony Corallo had replaced Vario with Salvatore Santoro. On parole, Vario moved to a residence near Miami, Florida.

In 1978, Vario approved his crew's participation in the infamous Lufthansa heist at JFK airport. The idea was presented to Vario by phone while he was in Florida. Vario quickly gave his approval, but insisted that Jimmy Burke, then in prison, supervise it. In December 1978, the crew successfully looted an estimated $5 million in cash and $875,000 in jewelry (equivalent to $29 million in 2025).

== Return to prison and death ==
On February 9, 1984, Vario was convicted of defrauding the federal government. Now a government witness, Hill testified that Vario had arranged a fictitious restaurant job for Hill so that Hill could be released from federal prison. Vario was convicted and on April 3, 1984, he was sentenced to four years in federal prison and fined $10,000.

On February 21, 1985, while serving his prison sentence, Vario was indicted in a racketeering conspiracy that involved extortion. He and co-conspirators were charged with extorting over $350,000 from air cargo companies at JFK airport, threatening them with labor problems if they did not pay. Convicted again with the help of Hill's testimony, he was sentenced to 10 years' imprisonment for extortion.

Vario died on May 3, 1988, aged 73, from respiratory failure as a result of lung cancer while incarcerated at Fort Worth Federal Prison in Fort Worth, Texas. He is buried at St. John Cemetery, Middle Village, Queens, New York.

== Cultural depictions of Vario ==
Vario has been portrayed in several media productions.

- In director Martin Scorsese's 1990 film Goodfellas, Paul Vario Sr. is depicted as the character Paul Cicero, portrayed by actor Paul Sorvino.
- In the 2001 Canada-American TV movie The Big Heist, Paul Vario is portrayed by actor Gino Marrocco.
