= Nicholas Pileggi =

American writer and journalist (born 1933)

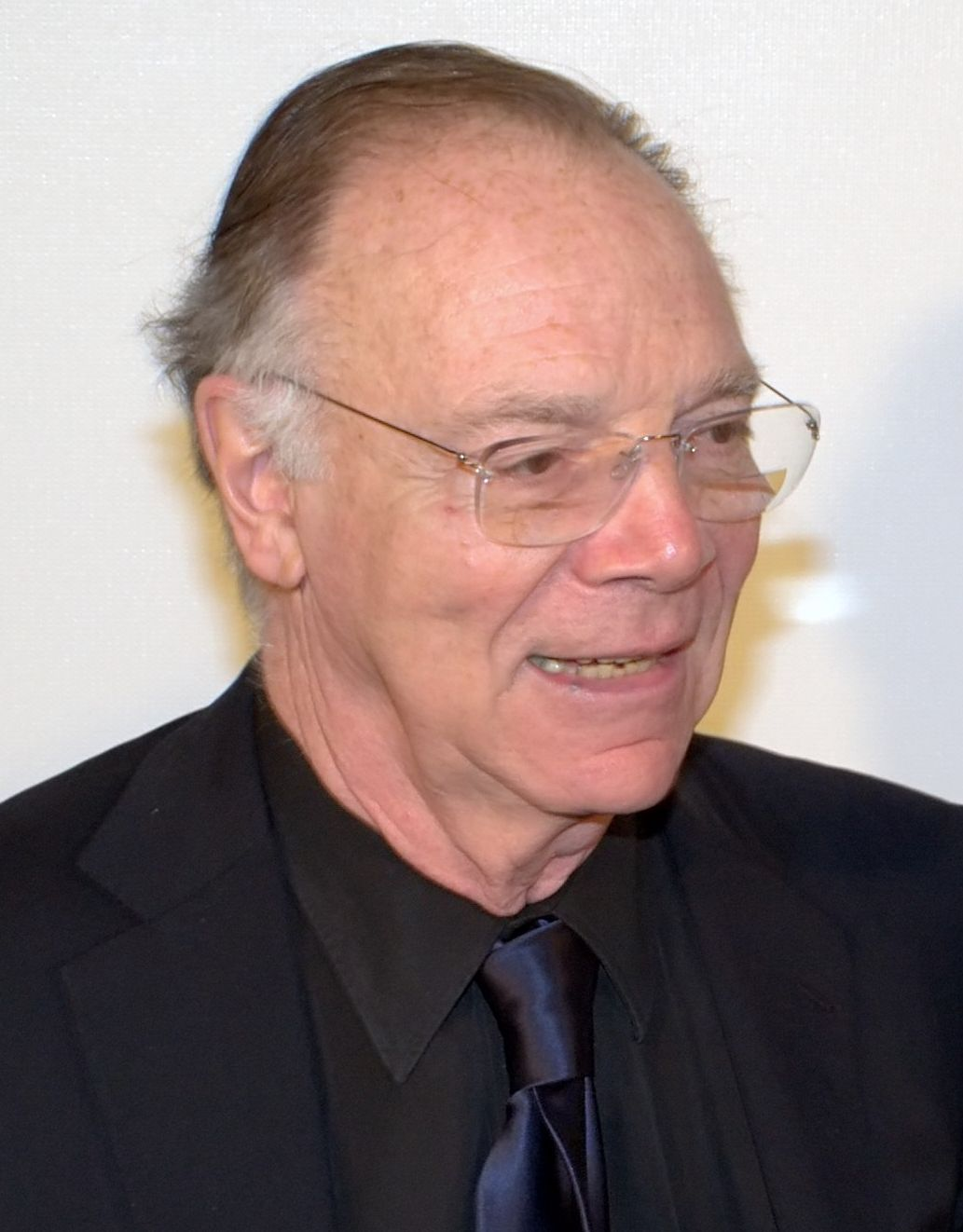
- Pileggi in 2010
- Born: February 22, 1933 (age 93); New York City, U.S.
- Occupations: Screenwriter; Producer; journalist
- Spouse: Nora Ephron (m. 1987; died 2012)
- Writing career
- Years active: 1950s–present
- Genre: True crime
- Subject: Organized crime
- Notable works: Wiseguy (1985); Casino: Love and Honor in Las Vegas (1995)

Nicholas Pileggi (/pɪˈlɛdʒi/, Italian: [piˈleddʒi]; born February 22, 1933) is an American author, screenwriter, film producer and journalist. He is the widower of director and journalist Nora Ephron. He wrote the 1985 non-fiction book Wiseguy and co-wrote the screenplay for Goodfellas, its 1990 film adaptation, for which he received a nomination for the Academy Award for Best Adapted Screenplay.

== Early life ==
Pileggi was born and raised in Brooklyn, the elder son of an Italian immigrant father, Nicola ("Nick") Pileggi from Calabria, a musician who played slide trombone in a cinema orchestra for silent films and subsequently also owned shoe stores, and an American-born mother, Susie.

In the 1950s, he worked as a journalist for the Associated Press and New York magazine, specializing in crime reporting for more than three decades.

== Career ==
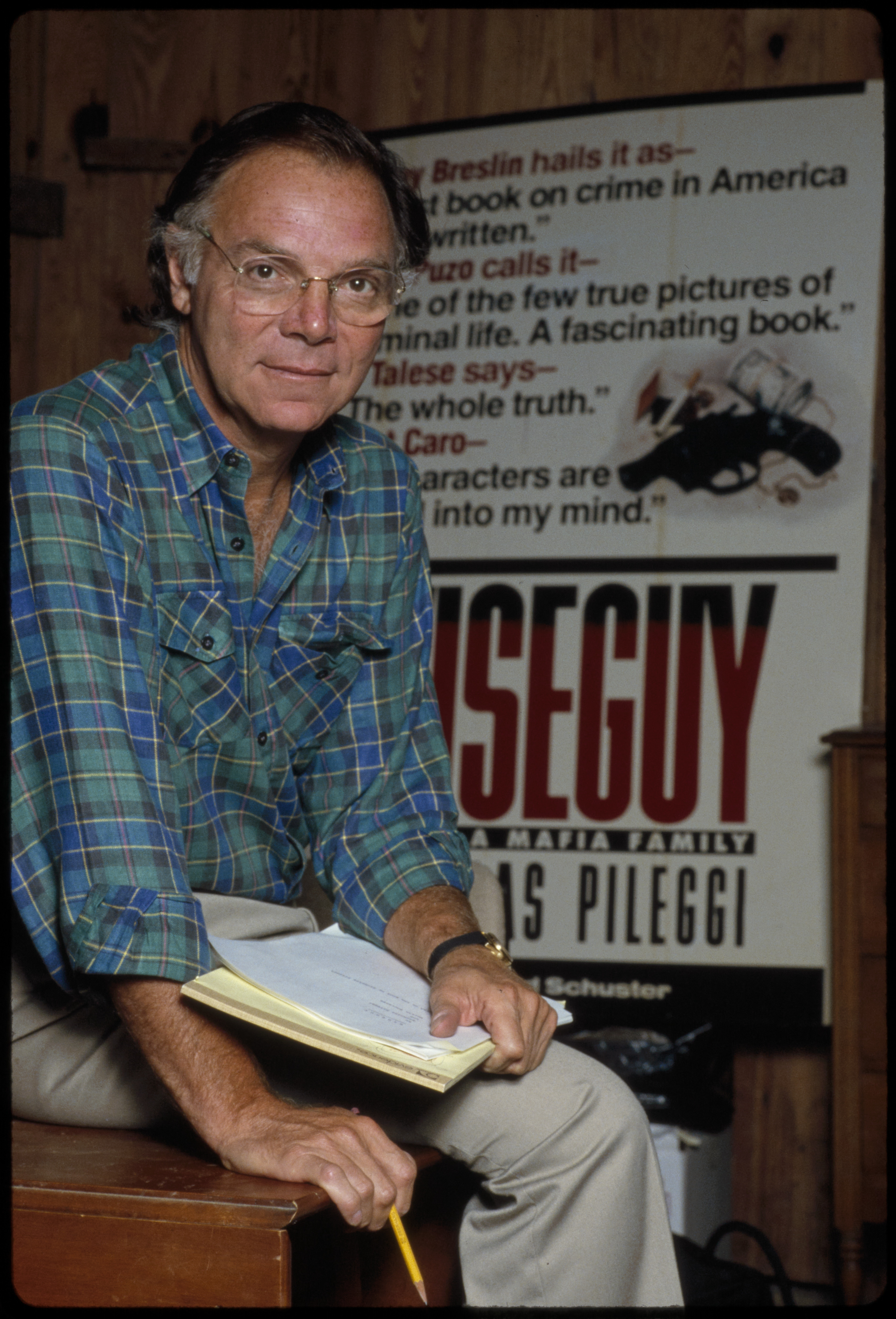
Pileggi in 1986

Pileggi began his career as a journalist and had a profound interest in the Mafia. He is best known for writing Wiseguy: Life in a Mafia Family (1985), which he adapted into the movie Goodfellas (1990), and for writing Casino: Love and Honor in Las Vegas and the subsequent screenplay for Casino (1995). The movie versions of both were directed and co-written by Martin Scorsese. Pileggi also co-wrote the screenplay for the film City Hall (1996), starring Al Pacino. He served as an executive producer for American Gangster (2007), a biographical crime film based on the career of drug lord Frank Lucas. He also authored Blye, Private Eye (1987).

He wrote the foreword to Frank Ragano's memoir Mob Lawyer. Pileggi co-wrote the pilot of the CBS television series Vegas, which first aired in September 2012.

== Personal life ==
Pileggi's first marriage ended in divorce around 1979. Pileggi was married to fellow author, journalist, and filmmaker Nora Ephron from 1987 until her death in 2012. Journalist Gay Talese is his first cousin.

== Partial filmography ==
Year	Film	Role	Notes
1990	Goodfellas	Screenwriter	BAFTA – Best Screenplay – Adapted (1991); Chicago Film Critics Association Award for Best Screenplay
1993	Father Hood	Producer	
1994	Loyalty & Betrayal: The Story of the American Mob	Screenwriter	Television documentary film
1995	Casino	Screenwriter	
1996	City Hall	Screenwriter	
2007	Kings of South Beach	Screenwriter and producer	Television film
2007	American Gangster	Executive producer	
2012	Vegas	Co-creator and executive producer	Television series
2019	The Irishman	Executive producer	
2025	The Alto Knights	Screenwriter	

== Books ==
- Blye, Private Eye. Playboy Press, Chicago. 1976. ISBN 0872234754.
- Wiseguy: Life in a Mafia Family. Simon & Schuster. 1985. ISBN 0671447343.
- Casino: Love and Honor in Las Vegas. Simon & Schuster. 1995. ISBN 0684808323.

=== Introductions ===
- Ragano, Frank (1994). "Foreword". Mob Lawyer. Charles Scribner's Sons.
