= Garbage barge =

Garbage barge may refer to:

- A barge carrying garbage onboard
- Mobro 4000
- Khian Sea waste disposal incident
