= Lucchese crime family =

One of the "Five Families" that dominate organized crime activities in New York City, US

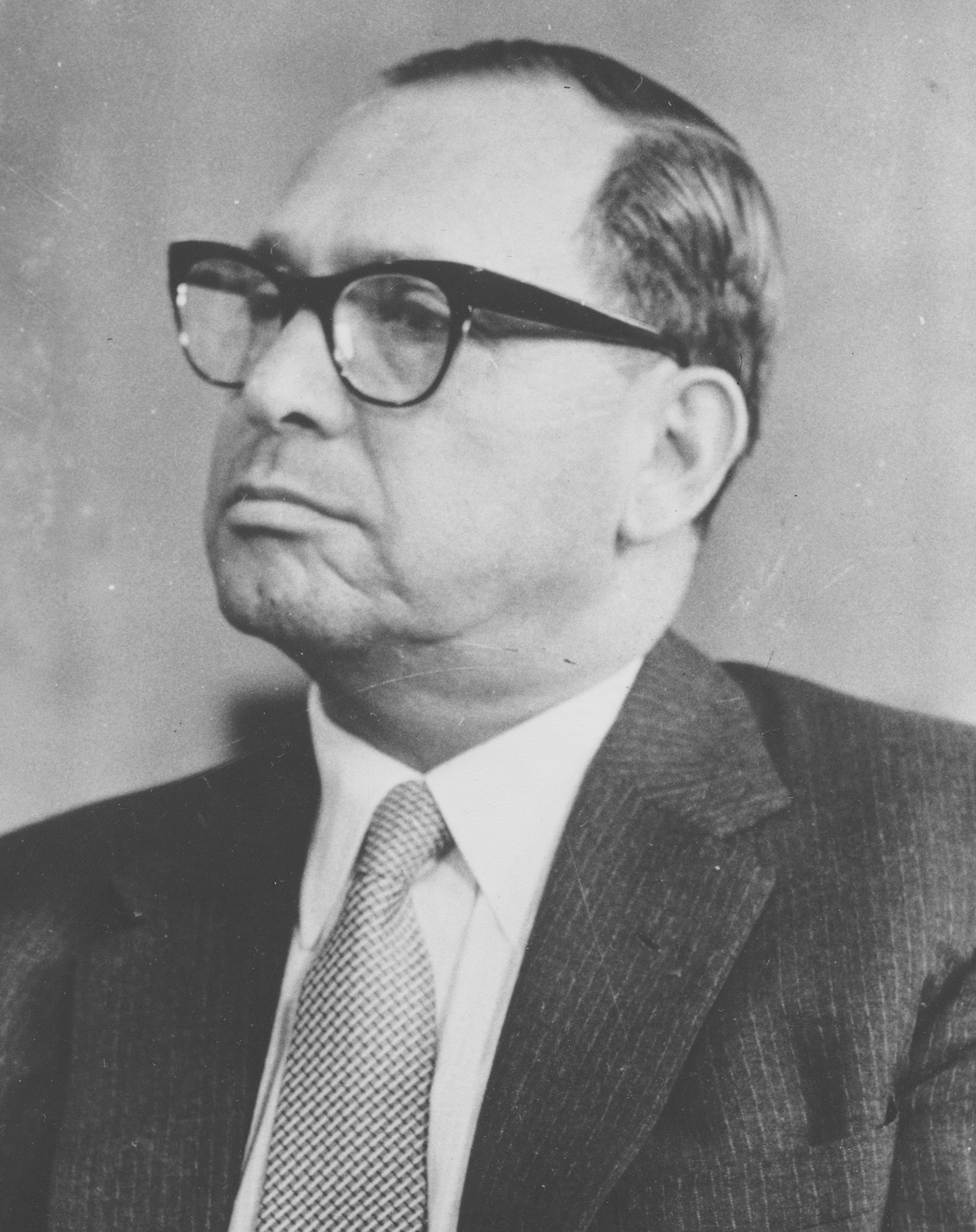
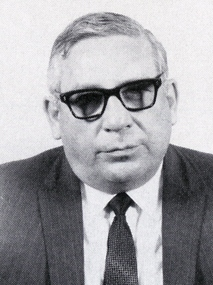
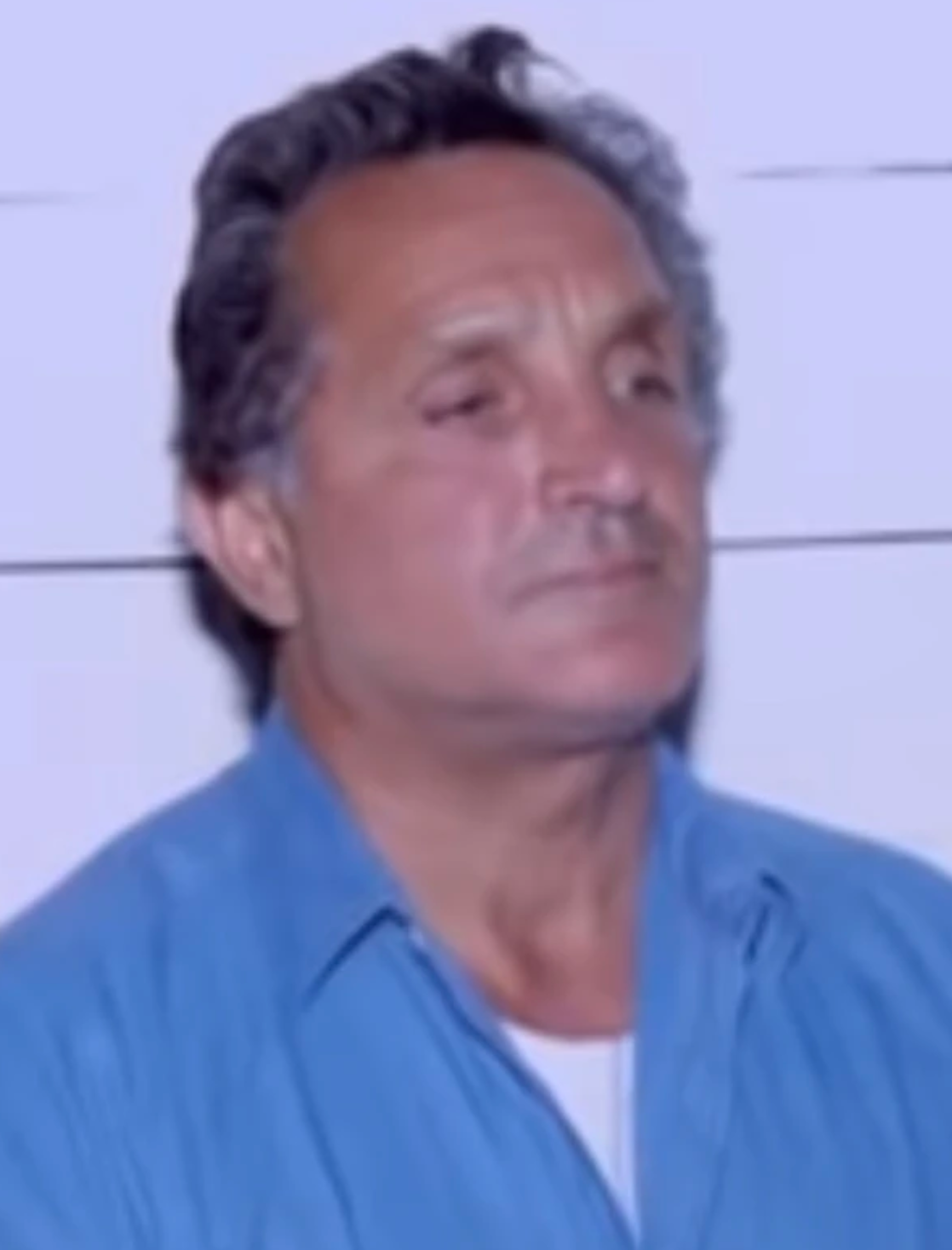
- Tommy Lucchese Anthony Corallo Victor Amuso
- Founded: c. 1920s
- Founder: Tommy Gagliano
- Named after: Tommy Lucchese
- Founding location: New York City, New York, U.S.
- Years active: c. 1920s–present
- Territory: Primarily the New York metropolitan area, including Long Island, Westchester County and New Jersey, as well as Las Vegas, Los Angeles and South Florida
- Ethnicity: Italians as "made men" and other ethnicities as associates
- Membership (est.): 100 made members and 200 associates (1990); 110–140 made members and 1,000+ associates (2004); 121 made members (2021)
- Activities: Racketeering, gambling, loansharking, extortion, labor racketeering, drug trafficking, arms trafficking, robbery, truck hijacking, theft, fencing, fraud, money laundering, bribery, waste dumping violations, prostitution, pornography, assault, and murder
- Allies: Bonanno crime family; Buffalo crime family; Chicago Outfit; Colombo crime family; DeCavalcante crime family; Gambino crime family; Genovese crime family; Philadelphia crime family; Pittsburgh crime family; Nine Trey Gangsters; Purple Gang; South Brooklyn Boys; Tanglewood Boys; Velentzas Organization
- Rivals: Rudaj Organization; and various other gangs in New York City, including their allies
- Notable members: List of current members; List of former members

The Lucchese crime family (Italian: [lukˈkeːze; -eːse]) is an Italian American Mafia crime family and one of the "Five Families" that dominate organized crime activity in New York City, within the nationwide criminal phenomenon known as the American Mafia. Members refer to the organization as the Lucchese borgata; borgata (or brugard) is Mafia slang for criminal gang, which itself was derived from a Sicilian word meaning close-knit community. The members of other crime families sometimes refer to Lucchese members as "Lukes".

The Lucchese family originated in the early 1920s; Gaetano Reina served as its boss until his murder in 1930. It was taken over by Tommy Gagliano during the Castellammarese War, and led by him until his death in 1951. Known as the Gagliano crime family under his leadership, the family kept their activities low-key, with their efforts concentrated in the Bronx, Manhattan and New Jersey.

The family's next boss was Tommy Lucchese, who had served as Gagliano's underboss for over twenty years. Lucchese led the family to become one of the most powerful to sit on the Commission, the Mafia's governing body. Lucchese partnered with Gambino crime family boss Carlo Gambino to control organized crime in New York, exerting a stronghold over the city's garment industry and other criminal rackets.

When Lucchese died of a brain tumor in 1967, Carmine Tramunti controlled the family for a brief time; he was arrested in 1973 for funding a major heroin network and died five years later. The secretive Anthony Corallo then gained control of the family, soon becoming one of the most powerful members of the Commission. He was arrested and convicted in the Mafia Commission Trial of 1986.

For most of its history, the Lucchese family was reckoned as one of the most peaceful crime families in the United States. However, that changed when Corallo named Victor Amuso as his successor shortly before going to prison. Amuso later promoted one of his closest allies, Anthony Casso, to underboss. Starting in 1986, Amuso and Casso instituted one of the bloodiest reigns in Mafia history, ordering virtually anyone who crossed them to be murdered. Casso also had the advantage of employing two corrupt New York City Police Department (NYPD) detectives, Louis Eppolito and Stephen Caracappa, as hitmen in killing at least eight individuals in service to the Lucchese family.

Amuso was arrested in 1991 and sentenced to life imprisonment. Several Lucchese members, fearing for their lives, turned informant. The highest-profile of these was acting boss Alphonse D'Arco, who became the first boss of a New York family to testify against the Mafia. This led to the arrests of the entire Lucchese family hierarchy, with Casso also becoming an informant. Casso pleaded guilty to seventy crimes, including racketeering, extortion and fifteen murders and was sentenced to 455 years in prison. Testimony from these informants nearly destroyed the family, with as many as half of its members winding up incarcerated. Amuso continues to rule the family from prison.

== History ==
=== Early history ===
The early history of the Lucchese crime family can be traced back to the Morello crime family, which was based in East Harlem and the Bronx in the early 20th century. During the 1910s, the bosses of the Morello family lost power and control, which allowed Gaetano "Tommy" Reina, along with Salvatore D'Aquila and Joe Masseria, to split off and form their own crime families. The Morello family lost more control during the Mafia-Camorra War as many top leaders were imprisoned and murdered.

By 1920, Reina ruled as boss of his own crime family, controlling criminal operations in the Bronx and parts of East Harlem. His family held a monopoly over ice box distribution in the Bronx. That same year, with Prohibition having just been passed, Reina's wealth and power grew as he aligned himself with Masseria, who became the most powerful Italian American crime boss in New York. In 1930, the Castellammarese War began as Masseria fought with rival Sicilian boss Salvatore Maranzano. At this point, Masseria started demanding a share of Reina's criminal profits, prompting Reina to consider changing his allegiance to Maranzano. When Masseria learned of Reina's possible betrayal, he plotted with Reina lieutenant Tommy Gagliano to have Reina murdered.

On February 26, 1930, a gunman (suspected to be Vito Genovese or Joseph Pinzolo) murdered Reina outside his aunt's apartment. With Reina dead, Masseria bypassed Gagliano, who expected to take control of the family, and installed his underling Joseph "Fat Joe" Pinzolo as boss. Furious with this betrayal, Gagliano and Tommy Lucchese secretly defected to Maranzano. In September 1930, Lucchese lured Pinzolo to a Manhattan office building, where Pinzolo was killed. This allowed Gagliano to take control of the Reina family. Months later, on April 15, 1931, Masseria was murdered and the war ended.

=== The Two Tommies ===
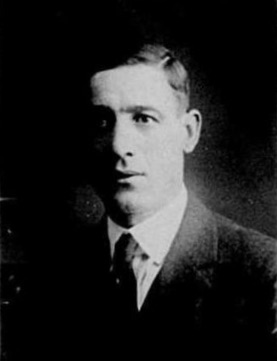
Photo of boss Thomas Gagliano

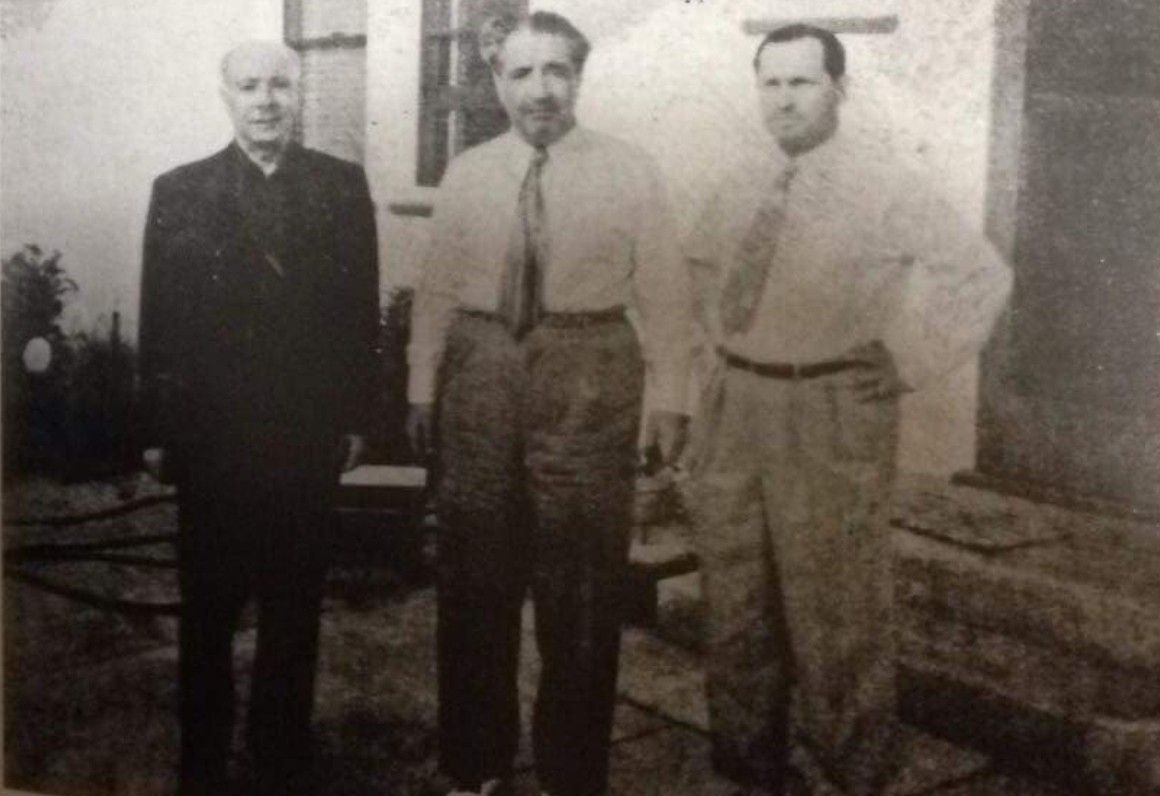
Left to right: Stefano LaSalle, LA crime family boss Jack Dragna and Lucchese c. 1948

After the murder of Masseria, a meeting between the families was convened by Maranzano, who proclaimed himself the new capo di tutti capi (boss of all bosses) of the American Mafia. Maranzano outlined a peace plan in which twenty-four organizations (to be known as "families") throughout the country would elect their own bosses, while the Italian American gangs in New York would be reorganized into five families. One of these families was headed by Gagliano, who was confirmed as boss of the old Reina organization with Lucchese as his underboss. The other four families were to be headed by Maranzano, Lucky Luciano, Vincent Mangano and Joseph Profaci, with Maranzano wielding authority over all of the families.

However, Luciano and other mobsters were not willing to serve under Maranzano. When Maranzano learned about Luciano's disaffection, he hired a gunman to kill him. However, in September 1931, Luciano struck first. Several Jewish assassins provided by Luciano's associate, Meyer Lansky, murdered Maranzano at his office inside the New York Central Building at 230 Park Avenue, making Luciano the most powerful mobster in the city.

Luciano kept the family structure as created by Maranzano but removed the boss of bosses title in favor of a governing body, the Commission. The body's responsibility was to regulate the families' affairs and mediate disputes between mobsters. The first Commission members included Luciano, Gagliano, Bonanno, Profaci, Mangano, Chicago Outfit boss Al "Scarface" Capone and Buffalo family boss Stefano Magaddino, with Luciano as chairman. Although the Commission was technically a democratic institution, it was actually controlled by Luciano and his allies.

During the 1930s and 1940s, Gagliano and Lucchese led their family into profitable areas of New York's trucking and garment industries. When Luciano was sent to prison for pandering in 1936, a rival alliance took control of the Commission. The alliance of Mangano, Bonanno, Magaddino and Profaci used their power to control organized crime in the U.S. Understanding his vulnerability, Gagliano was careful to avoid openly opposing this new alliance, preferring to quietly pass his orders through Lucchese and a few other close allies. Lucchese, by contrast, embraced his role as the public face and street boss of the family. In 1946 he attended the Havana Conference in Cuba on behalf of Gagliano.

=== Lucchese era ===
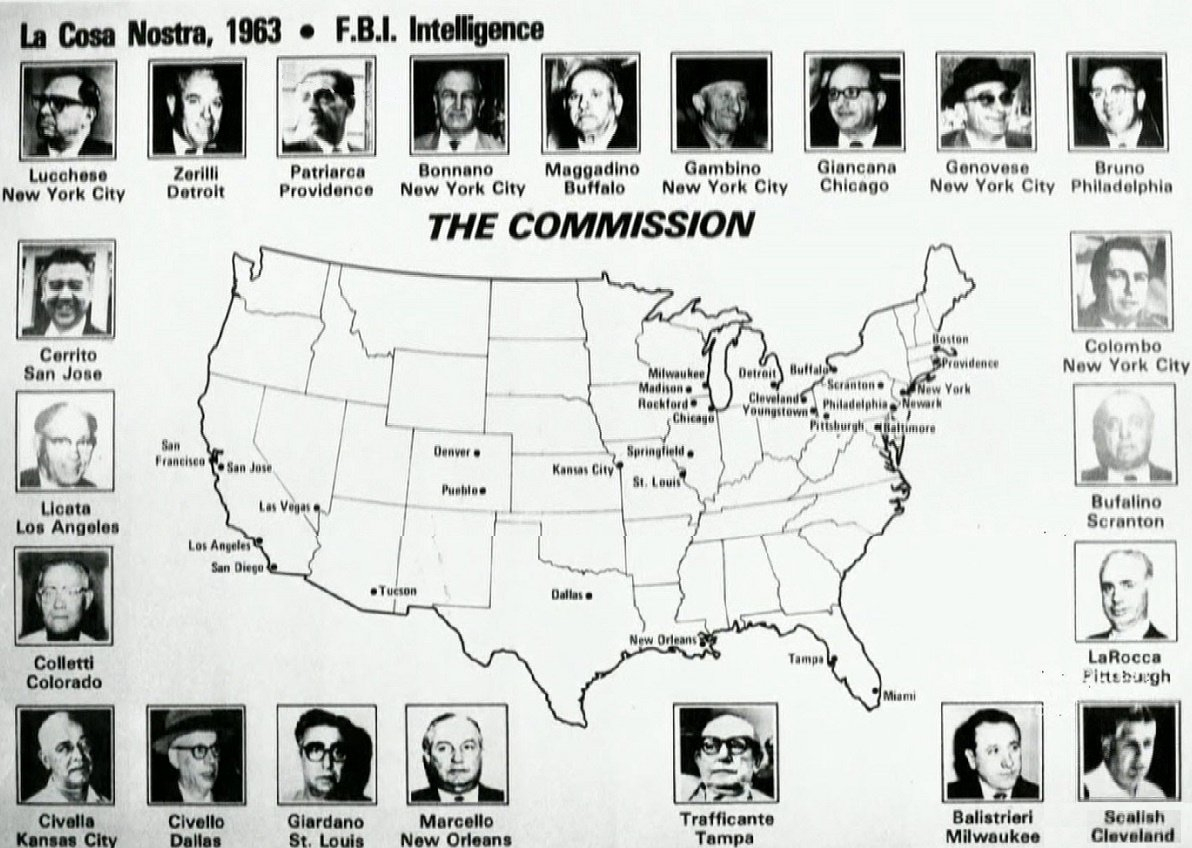
FBI's 1963 La Cosa Nostra Commission chart

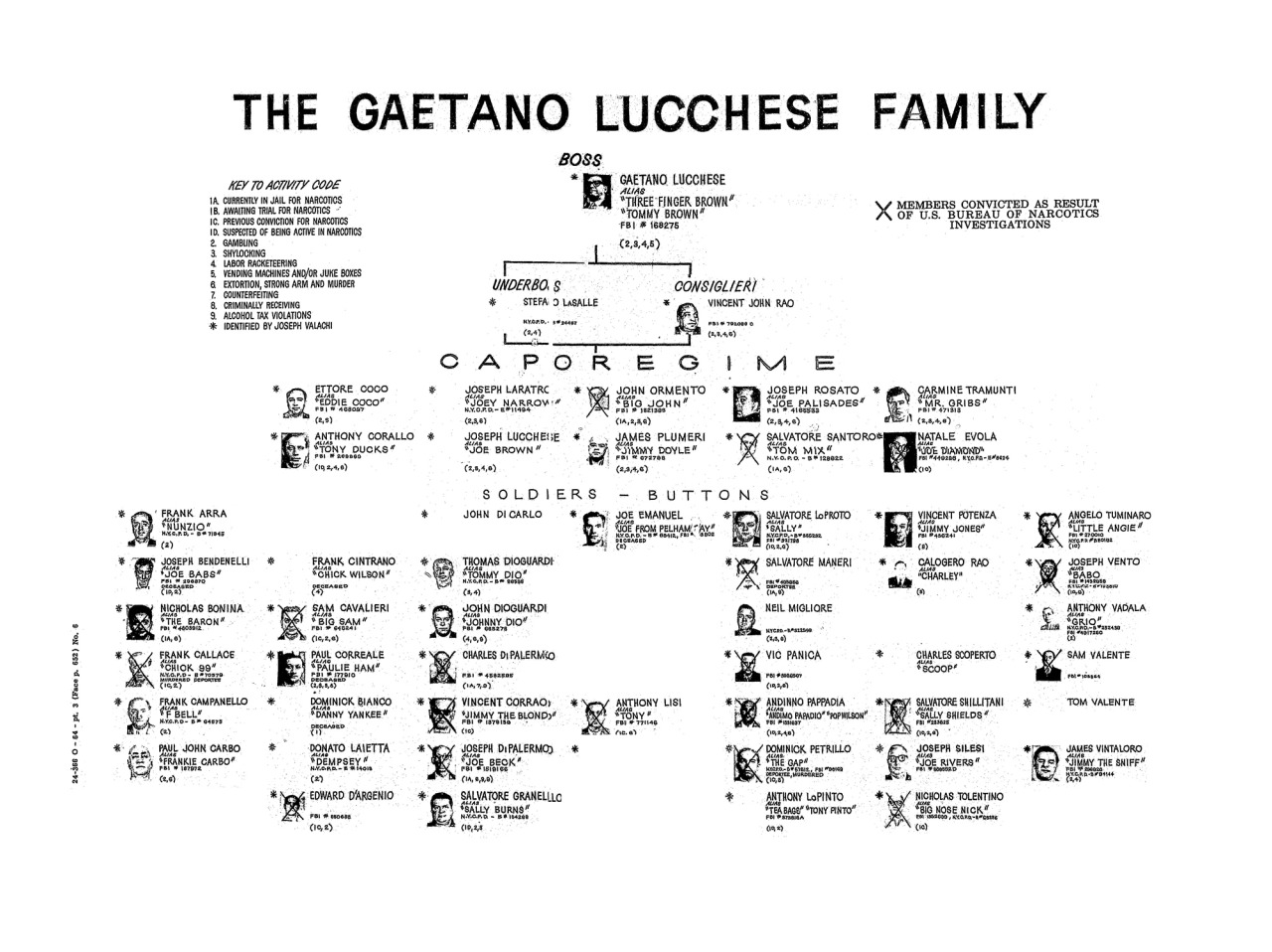
Valachi hearings chart of Lucchese family in 1963

After Gagliano's death in 1951, Lucchese took over the family as its boss and appointed Vincenzo Rao as his consigliere and Stefano LaSalle as his underboss. Lucchese continued Gagliano's policies, making the family one of the most profitable in New York City. He established control over Teamsters union locals, workers' co-operatives and trade associations, and rackets at the new Idlewild Airport. He expanded the family's rackets in Manhattan's Garment District and in related trucking industry activities around the city. Lucchese built close relations with many powerful New York politicians, including Mayors William O'Dwyer and Vincent Impellitteri and members of the judiciary, who aided the family on numerous occasions. Throughout his regime, Lucchese kept a low profile and saw to it that his men were well taken care of.

During the 1950s, Lucchese controlled a narcotics trafficking network with Santo Trafficante Jr., the boss of the Tampa crime family. He also helped Genovese and Carlo Gambino in their struggles to take control of their respective families. The three plotted to take over the Commission by murdering bosses Frank Costello and Albert Anastasia. On May 2, 1957, Costello survived an assassination attempt and immediately decided to retire in favor of Genovese. Then, on October 25, 1957, the Gallo brothers (from the Colombo crime family) murdered Anastasia inside the barber shop of the Park Sheraton Hotel, allowing Gambino to become boss.

Almost immediately, Lucchese and Gambino started conspiring to remove their former ally, Genovese. After the disastrous 1957 Apalachin meeting in Upstate New York, in which numerous high-ranking mobsters were arrested by police, Genovese lost face within the Commission. In 1959, with the assistance of Luciano, Costello and Lansky, Genovese was arrested on drug charges. Assuming full control of the Mafia Commission, in 1960 Lucchese and Gambino backed the Gallo brothers in their rebellion against Profaci. The two men saw the turmoil within the Profaci family as an opportunity to take over their rackets. After uncovering a plot by Joseph Bonanno to assassinate them, Lucchese and Gambino used the Commission to strip Bonanno of his role as boss. This power play started a war within the Bonanno family and served to strengthen both the Lucchese and Gambino families.

In 1962, Gambino's oldest son, Thomas, married Lucchese's daughter Frances, strengthening the Gambino-Lucchese alliance. Lucchese led a quiet, stable life until his death from a brain tumor on July 13, 1967. At the time of his death, he had not spent a day in jail in forty-four years. Lucchese left his family in a very powerful position in New York City, firmly in control of rackets in East Harlem and the Bronx and consisting of about 200 made members. Lucchese intended for longtime caporegime (captain) Anthony Corallo to succeed him. However, since Corallo was imprisoned at the time, he named another longtime capo, Carmine Tramunti, as acting boss until Corallo's release.

=== Tramunti and the French Connection ===
Around the time of his appointment as temporary boss, Tramunti was in ill health. With boss-in-waiting Corallo in prison, Tramunti was expected to hold power until his release. Tramunti faced a number of criminal charges during his time as acting boss and was eventually convicted of financing a large heroin smuggling operation, the infamous French Connection responsible for distributing millions of dollars in heroin along the East Coast during the early 1970s.

Before the French Connection trial, the seized heroin was stored in a New York City Police Department (NYPD) evidence room pending trial. In a brazen scheme, criminals stole bags containing hundreds of kilograms of heroin worth $70 million from the room and replaced them with bags of flour. Officers discovered the theft when they noticed insects eating the so-called heroin. The scope and depth of this scheme are still unknown, but officials suspect the thieves had assistance from corrupt NYPD officers. Certain plotters received jail sentences, including Vincent Papa (later assassinated while in prison), Virgil Alessi and Anthony Loria. In 1974, after Tramunti's incarceration, Corallo finally took charge of the family.

=== Corallo and the Jaguar ===
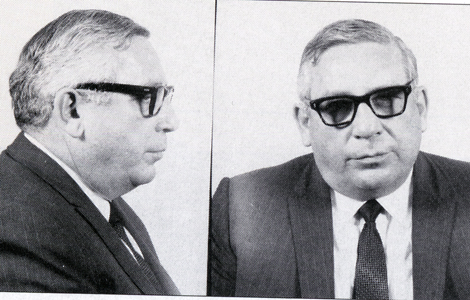
FBI mugshot of Anthony Corallo

After Tramunti's incarceration in 1974, Corallo finally took control of the Lucchese family. Corallo came from the Harlem faction of the family. Known as "Tony Ducks" from his ease at 'ducking' criminal convictions, he was a boss squarely in Lucchese's mold. Corallo had been heavily involved in labor racketeering and worked closely with Jimmy Hoffa, the Teamsters president, during the 1940s and 1950s. Corallo also enjoyed close ties to the Painters and Decorators Union, the Conduit Workers Union and the United Textile Workers Union. He appointed Salvatore "Tom Mix" Santoro as underboss and supervisor of all labor and construction racketeering operations in New York, and Christopher Furnari as the reputed consigliere. Corallo, who held high regard for the New Jersey faction of the family, reputedly inducted and promoted Anthony Accetturo and Michael Taccetta into the organization and put them in charge of the Jersey Crew, which reportedly controlled most of the Luccheses' loansharking and illegal gambling operations in Newark. The family prospered under Corallo's leadership, particularly in narcotics trafficking, labor racketeering and major illegal gambling.

Corallo never discussed business during sit-downs, fearing that federal authorities were monitoring the conversations. Instead, he used a car phone in the Jaguar owned by his bodyguard and chauffeurs, discussing business while being driven around the city. Salvatore Avellino and Aniello Migliore shifted as Corallo's chauffeurs during the 1970s and 1980s. In the early 1980s, the FBI finally managed to plant a bug in the Jaguar, recording Corallo speaking about the family's activities at great length. Corallo was arrested and put on trial along with the other bosses of the Five Families, in what became known as the Mafia Commission Trial.

On December 16, 1985, Gambino boss Paul Castellano was murdered without Commission approval. In response, the Genovese and Lucchese families conspired against Gambino capo John Gotti, who had engineered the hit. The alliance resulted in the murder of Gambino underboss Frank DeCicco, but failed in its attempts to kill Gotti.

As the Mafia Commission Trial wore on, Corallo realized that the entire Lucchese hierarchy was about to be decimated. Not only was it all but certain that he, Santoro and Furnari would be convicted, but they faced sentences that, given their ages, would all but assure they would die in prison. In the fall of 1986, Corallo appointed Anthony "Buddy" Luongo as acting boss. However, Luongo disappeared in 1986. As a result, Corallo appointed Victor Amuso, the capo of Furnari's old crew. Allegedly, both Amuso and another longtime protègé of Furnari, Anthony Casso, were top candidates for the job. Evidence suggests that Corallo wanted Casso, but Casso convinced him to select Amuso instead. Amuso officially became boss in January 1987, when Corallo, Santoro and Furnari were sentenced to 100 years in prison. Amuso made Casso his underboss in 1989, allowing him to exert great influence over the family. Corallo and Santoro died in prison in 2000, while Furnari was released in 2014.

=== The iron fists of Amuso and Casso ===
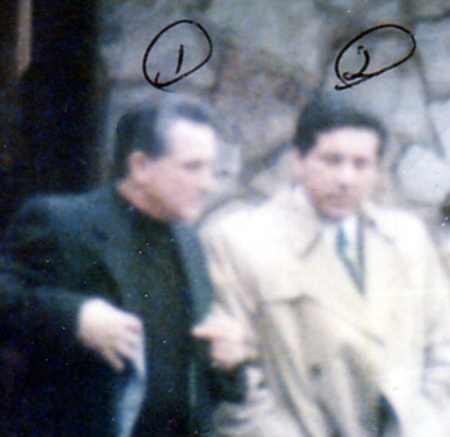
FBI surveillance photo of Anthony Casso (right) with Lucchese family boss, Vittorio Amuso

During the late 1980s, the Lucchese family underwent a period of great turmoil. Amuso and Casso, the first members of the family's Brooklyn faction to head the family, instituted one of the most violent reigns in American mob history. Both men were heavily involved in labor racketeering, extortion and drug trafficking, and both had committed many murders. While they were allies of Genovese family boss Vincent Gigante, they were bitter rivals to Gotti and the Gambinos.

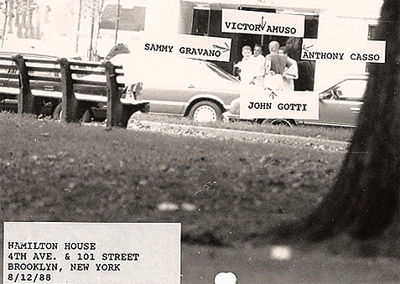
FBI surveillance photograph of Amuso, Casso, John Gotti and Sammy Gravano

During the late 1980s, Amuso began demanding 50% of the profits generated by the Jersey Crew. When Accetturo and Taccetta refused the demand, Amuso and Casso ordered the entire Jersey Crew killed – the now-infamous "whack Jersey" order. He summoned the crew to a meeting in Brooklyn. Fearful for their lives, the entire crew skipped the meeting and went into hiding. Taccetta and Accetturo were later put on trial in 1990.

Both Amuso and Casso were implicated in a case involving the fitting of thousands of windows in New York at inflated prices, and the pair went into hiding that same year, naming Alphonse D'Arco as acting boss. For the next few years, Amuso and Casso ruled the family from afar and ordered the execution of anyone they deemed troublesome, typically because they were considered rivals or potential informants. This convinced many Lucchese members that Amuso and Casso were no longer acting or thinking rationally.

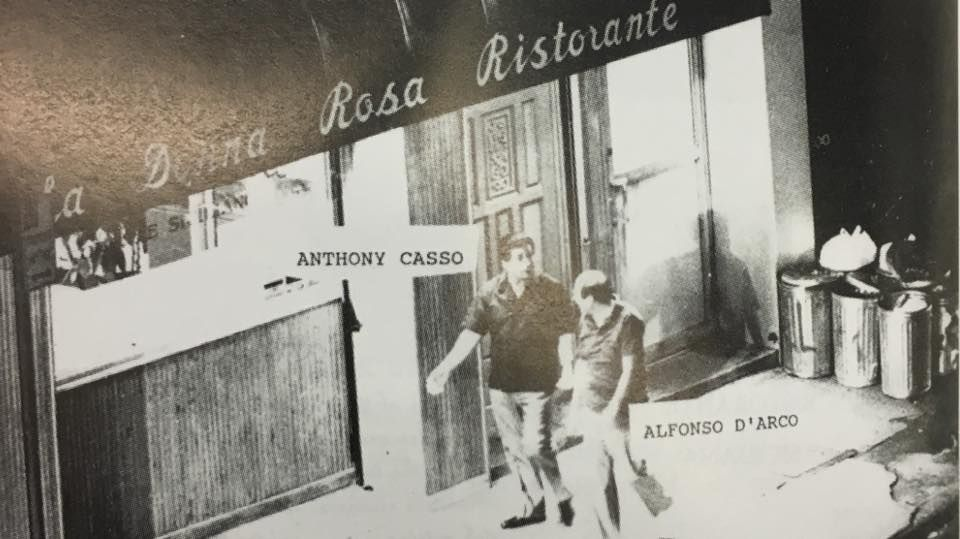
FBI surveillance photograph of Casso and Alphonse D'Arco

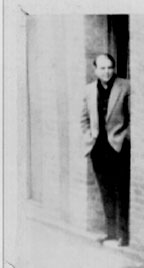
D'Arco in a 1970s FBI surveillance photo

What followed next was a series of botched hits on family members suspected of being informants. Ironically, these hits caused several family members to actually turn state's witness. Amuso ordered the slaying of capo Peter Chiodo, who, along with Casso, was in charge of the fraudulent windows operation. Chiodo was shot twelve times but still survived. After Amuso ordered hits on his wife and sister, in violation of longstanding Mafia rules against women being harmed, Chiodo turned state's evidence and provided the entire windows operation. After Amuso sanctioned a hit on Accetturo, who was on trial in 1990, he too cooperated with the government.

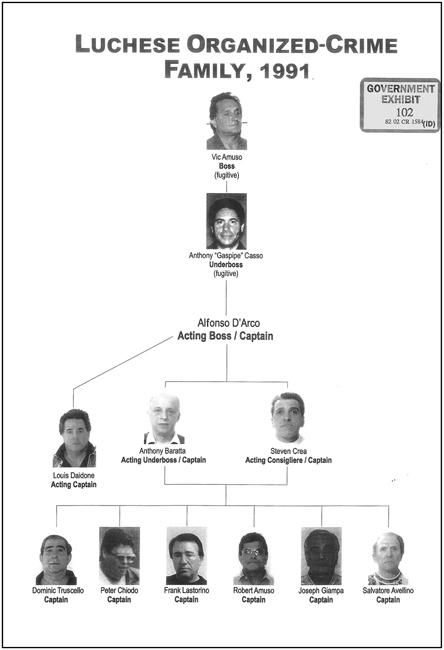
Lucchese family chart of 1991

The planned executions went as high as D'Arco, the acting boss. Furious over the failed hit on Chiodo, Amuso set up D'Arco to be killed at a Manhattan hotel. However, this hit came undone after D'Arco saw a man hide a gun in his shirt, then slip into the bathroom. Recognizing this as a classic setup for a hit, D'Arco fled for his life and turned himself over to authorities to spare himself and his family from Amuso and Casso's wrath. He was the first boss of a New York crime family, acting or otherwise, to become an informant.

Casso had reportedly conspired with reputed consigliere Frank Lastorino and Brooklyn leaders George Zappola and Frank Gioia Jr. into murdering Steven Crea, Amuso's acting underboss of the Bronx, as well as Gambino crime family acting boss John "Junior" Gotti, son of the imprisoned John Gotti, along with members of the Genovese family. But, due to massive indictments, none of the plots were committed.

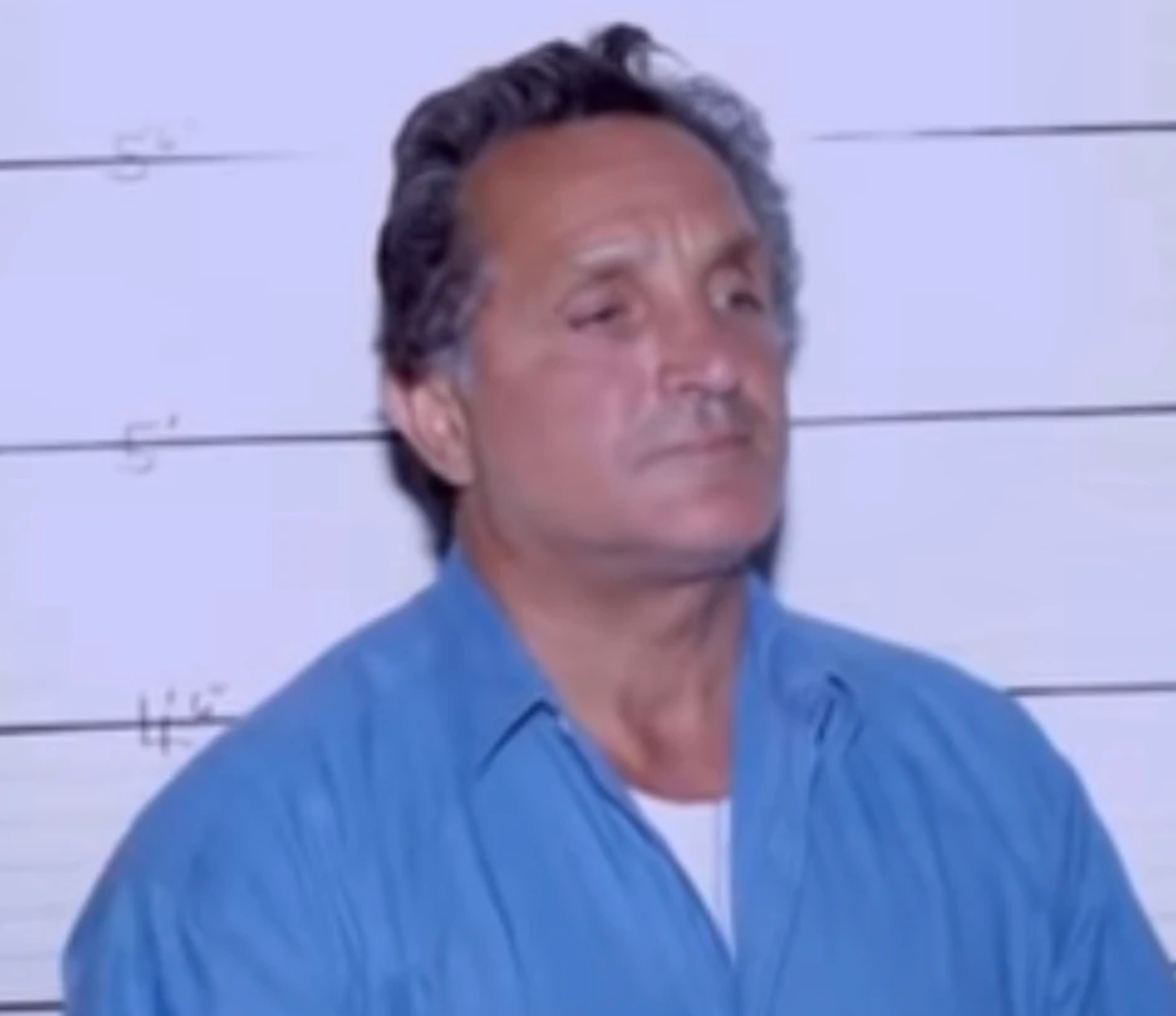
FBI mugshot of Vic Amuso

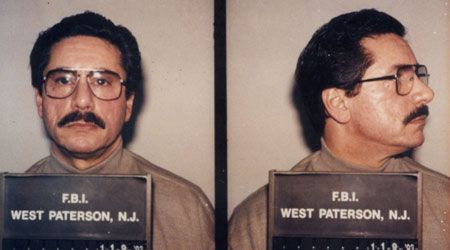
FBI mugshot of Anthony Casso

Law enforcement eventually caught up with the two fugitives. On July 29, 1991, the FBI captured Amuso in Scranton, Pennsylvania, and on January 19, 1993, the FBI captured Casso in Mount Olive, New Jersey. Amuso steadfastly refused all offers from the government to make a deal and become a government witness. He was convicted on all charges in 1992 and sentenced to life in prison. Believing that Casso had tipped off the FBI in hopes of taking over the family, Amuso removed Casso as underboss and declared him an outcast. Facing the prospect of spending the rest of his life in prison, Casso agreed to a deal on March 1, 1994, and started revealing family secrets.

One of the biggest secrets was that two New York Police Department detectives, Louis Eppolito and Stephen Caracappa, had been on Casso's payroll. For years, Eppolito and Caracappa had provided Casso with sensitive police information; Casso had even used them on hits. Casso related how Eppolito and Caracappa, on Christmas Day 1986, murdered an innocent Brooklyn man who had the same name as a suspected government informant. Casso told the government that in 1992 Lucchese hit men tried to kill the sister of another suspected informant, violating the alleged Mafia "rule" barring violence against family members.

Casso was thrown out of the witness protection program in 1998 after prosecutors alleged numerous infractions in 1997, including bribing guards, assaulting other inmates, and making "false statements" about Sammy "the Bull" Gravano and D'Arco. Casso's attorney tried to get Judge Frederic Block to overrule federal prosecutors in July 1998, but Block refused to do so. Shortly afterward, Judge Block sentenced Casso to 455 years in prison without possibility of parole—the maximum sentence permitted under sentencing guidelines. On December 15, 2020, Casso died in prison from complications related to previous health issues and COVID-19.

=== Mafia cops ===
In 1994, Casso revealed that two respected New York City police detectives worked as hitmen and informants for Casso during the 1980s and early 1990s before their retirement. They were Louis Eppolito and Stephen Caracappa, who spent much of their combined 44 years with the NYPD committing murders and leaking confidential information to the Lucchese family. Between 1986 and 1990, Eppolito and Caracappa participated in eight murders and received $375,000 from Casso in bribes and payments for murder 'contracts'. Casso used Caracappa and Eppolito to pressure the Gambino crime family by murdering several of their members. This is because Casso, along with the imprisoned Amuso and Genovese crime family boss Vincent Gigante, wanted their rival John Gotti out of the way. Caracappa and Eppolito are now seen as the main source of 'tension' between these three families during the late 1980s and early 1990s.

For one contract, Eppolito and Caracappa kidnapped mobster James Hydell, forced him into their car trunk, and delivered him to Casso for torture and murder. Hydell's body was never found. The two detectives also shot Bruno Facciolo, who was found in Brooklyn in the trunk of a car with a canary in his mouth. After pulling Gambino crime family captain Edward "Eddie" Lino for a routine traffic check, the detectives murdered him on the expressway in his Mercedes-Benz. In April 2006, Eppolito and Caracappa were convicted of murdering Hydell, Nicholas Guido, John "Otto" Heidel, John Doe, Anthony DiLapi, Facciolo, Lino, and Bartholomew "Bobby" Boriello on the orders of Casso and the Lucchese family. They were sentenced to life imprisonment.

=== Acting bosses DeFede and Crea ===
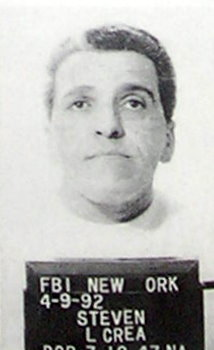
FBI mugshot of Steven Crea

While in prison, Amuso was able to regain control of the family after Anthony Casso was imprisoned. Amuso chose Joseph "Little Joe" DeFede to become his new acting boss. DeFede, who supervised the powerful Garment District racket, reportedly earned more than $40,000 to $60,000 a month. DeFede placed Steven Crea in charge of the family's labor and construction racketeering operations. Crea increased the Lucchese family earnings from these rackets between $300,000 and $500,000 every year. Throughout the mid-1990s, Amuso maintained control of the family from prison with his two allies, DeFede and Crea, running the rackets. In 1998, as US law enforcement kept pressuring organized crime activities in New York, DeFede was arrested and indicted on nine counts of racketeering. DeFede pleaded guilty to the charges and was sentenced to five years in prison. Amuso was angered at DeFede's guilty plea and promoted Crea as the new acting boss.

Steven "Stevie" Crea's success with the labor and construction rackets convinced Amuso that DeFede had been previously skimming off these profits. In late 1999, Amuso placed a contract on DeFede's life. On September 6, 2000, Crea and seven other Lucchese members were arrested and jailed on extortion charges, mostly to the supervising of the construction sites with various capos Dominic Truscello and Joseph Tangorra.

After Crea's imprisonment, the consigliere Louis "Lou Bagels" Daidone took control of the family. However, Daidone's tenure was short-lived. After his release from prison, the scared DeFede became a government witness and helped the government convict Daidone of murder and conspiracy. Daidone's conviction was also helped by the testimony from Alphonse D'Arco in September 2004.

=== Ruling panel ===
With the arrest of acting boss Louis Daidone in 2003, imprisoned boss Vic Amuso created a three-man ruling panel to run the family. The panel consisted of capos Aniello Migliore, Joseph DiNapoli, and Matthew Madonna, who brought the family's power back into the Bronx. In February 2004, a New York Post article stated that the Lucchese family consisted of about 9 capos and 82 soldiers. In March 2009, an article in the New York Post stated that the Lucchese family consisted of approximately 100 "made" members.

On December 18, 2007, two members of the panel, Joseph DiNapoli and Matthew Madonna, were arrested, along with New Jersey faction capo Ralph V. Perna, soldier Nicodemo Scarfo Jr., and others. The arrests came after New Jersey law enforcement agencies revealed through investigation Operation Heat that the New Jersey faction controlled a $2.2 billion illegal gambling, money laundering and racketeering ring based in New Jersey and Costa Rica.

On October 1, 2009, the Lucchese family was hit with two separate indictments charging 49 members and associates with bribery and racketeering. In the first indictment, 29 members and associates of the Lucchese family were arrested. The indictment charged Joseph DiNapoli, Matthew Madonna and acting capo Anthony Croce with running operations that grossed nearly $400 million from illegal gambling, loansharking, gun trafficking, bribery and extortion. In the second indictment obtained from investigation "Operation Open House" 12 more Lucchese mobsters were charged with bribery. The indictment charged acting capo Andrew Disimone and other mobsters with bribing New York Police Department (NYPD) detectives and sergeants posing as crooked cops to protect illegal poker parlors.

On November 18, 2009, family members were indicted under "Operation Night Gallery". Capo Anthony Croce, soldier Joseph Datello, and his brother, Frank Datello, were charged with loan sharking and bookmaking from the bar "Night Gallery" on Staten Island.

=== Madonna and Crea ===
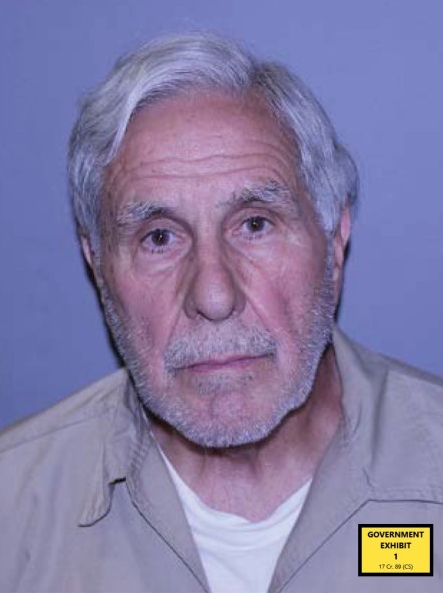
Mugshot of Matthew Madonna in 2017

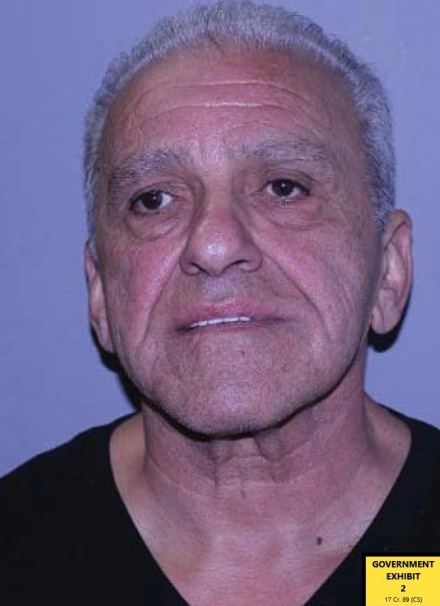
Mugshot of Steven Crea in 2017

After the ruling panel was disbanded in 2009, Matthew Madonna took over as acting boss, and Joseph DiNapoli became the new consigliere. In late 2009, the parole restrictions expired on longtime underboss Steven Crea, and he was able to rejoin the family's leadership again.

On January 16, 2013, the FBI arrested 29 members and associates of the Genovese, Lucchese, and Gambino crime families on racketeering charges related to their involvement in carting companies in Westchester County, Rockland County, and Nassau County in New York, and Bergen County and Passaic County in New Jersey. Members and associates of the Genovese, Lucchese and Gambino crime families controlled waste disposal businesses by dictating which companies could pick up trash at certain locations and extorting protection payments preventing further extortion from other mobsters.

In June 2013, the New York FBI office reduced the number of agents focused on investigating the five crime families to thirty-six agents, divided into two squads. In the past, the FBI had a separate squad of 10 to 20 agents investigating each crime family. Currently, the FBI has "squad C5", which at one time solely investigated the Genovese family, but will now also be investigating the Bonanno and Colombo families, and "squad C16", which previously investigated just the Gambino family, but will now be investigating the Lucchese family as well.

On August 4, 2016, United States Attorney of New York charged 46 Mafia leaders with racketeering conspiracy, arson, illegal trafficking in firearms and conspiracy to commit assault throughout the East Coast of the United States from Springfield, Massachusetts to Southern Florida. The 46 defendants were leaders, members, and associates of the Genovese, Gambino, Lucchese, Bonanno, and Philadelphia crime families. Members of the Lucchese family charged were soldiers Vincent Casablanca, Marco Minuto, and associates Paul Cassano and Pasquale Capolongo.

On May 31, 2017, 19 members and associates of the Lucchese crime family were indicted and charged by the FBI and NYPD with racketeering, assault, attempted murder, armed robbery, murder, firearms, fraud, witness tampering, money laundering, illegal gambling, narcotics and contraband cigarettes trafficking offences, which dated back to at least 2000. Members of the Lucchese leadership Matthew Madonna, Steven Crea and Joseph DiNapoli were among the accused. Lucchese associate Terrence Caldwell and soldier Christopher Londonio were accused of participating in the shooting and murder of Michael Meldish, a former leader of the East Harlem Purple Gang and Lucchese Bronx-based hitman, on November 15, 2013. Caldwell was already in custody for the May 29, 2013, attempted murder of Bonanno crime family soldier Enzo Stagno, who was shot in the chest in East Harlem, Manhattan. In late 2012, Crea ordered Vincent Bruno and soldier Paul Cassano to murder a Bonanno associate who disrespected him, the two men went to his home with guns, but the contract was not carried out. According to the FBI, Crea gave his approval in October 2016 to soldier Joseph Datello to murder an informant in New Hampshire, but he was unsuccessful in finding the informer. Datello himself was accused of operating a drug smuggling ring from South America into the United States with other Lucchese mobsters, with five kilograms of cocaine, more than one kilogram of heroin, and over 1,000 kilograms of marijuana allegedly brought into the country. Crea was personally charged with mail and wire fraud in connection with a skimming operation involving the construction of a New York City hospital. Originally all but two of the defendants faced the death penalty or life in prison, however in May 2018 the U.S. Attorney's Office announced that they would not seek the death penalty for Crea, Madonna, Londonio, Steven Crea Jr. and Caldwell.

On January 4, 2019 Joseph Datello was received a 14-year prison sentence, after pleading guilty to conspiracy to commit racketeering, including the attempted murder of the witness, narcotics trafficking, and collecting debts through the threat of violence on September 24, 2018. On August 20, 2019, Steven Crea Jr. pleaded guilty to racketeering and murder conspiracy charges and was later sentenced to 13 years in prison.

On November 15, 2019, Matthew Madonna, Steven Crea, Christopher Londonio and Terrence Caldwell were convicted in White Plains federal court of murdering Michael Meldish. On July 27, 2020, Madonna, Londonio and Caldwell were sentenced to life in prison for the Meldish murder. On August 27, 2020, Crea was sentenced to life in prison, along with a $400,000 fine and the forfeit of $1 million.

=== Current leadership ===
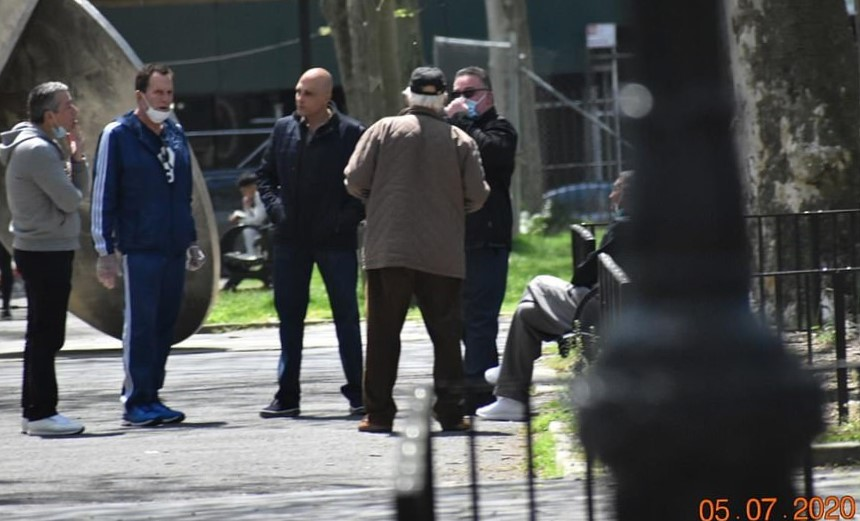
FBI surveillance photo of Lucchese family members on May 7, 2020, meeting in Jefferson Park. From left Andrew DiSimone, Mike DeSantis (blue track) Anthony Villani, Anthony Baratta, George Zappola, Frank Salerno

Although in prison for life, Victor Amuso remains the official boss of the Lucchese crime family.

On March 27, 2018, Lucchese crime family soldier, Dominick Capelli, and nine associates were arrested as part of Operation "The Vig Is Up". Attorney General Eric T. Schneiderman announced that it was the biggest loan sharking case investigated by the United States Attorney General Office. Over 47 people were identified as loansharking victims, who were allegedly charged exorbitant weekly loan rates averaging over 200 percent per year, effectively creating a high-cost debt trap for all individuals taking out such loans. The accused were alleged to have operated out of New Rochelle, New York and the Bronx. It was also said that the defendants ran an illegal bookmaking operation that generated over $1.5 million in annual wagers.

In a separate indictment in April 2018, Lucchese soldier Anthony Grado and associate Lawrence "Fat Larry" Tranese were arrested for forcing a doctor to prescribe them with over 230,000 oxycodone pills from 2011 through 2013. It was noted that Grado ordered one of his peers to stab the unidentified Brooklyn-based doctor during a visit, who complied with the task. Grado was recorded threatening the doctor, saying, "If the prescriptions go in anybody's hands besides mine, I'll put a bullet right in your head”. Both men pleaded guilty on April 5, 2018. The investigation was conducted by wiretaps, surveillance cameras, car bugs, undercover officers, hidden cameras and cost over $1 million. Grado was sentenced to 12 years imprisonment and Tranese to over three years.

In October 2018, associate Vincent Zito was murdered at his home in Sheepshead Bay, Brooklyn. He was found shot twice in the back of his head and a handgun was recovered beside his body. Zito was allegedly a loanshark. His brother Anthony Zito was jailed for extortion in 1971 and was a known associate of current Lucchese boss Vic Amuso.

In May 2019, government witness and former Lucchese soldier John Pennisi testified in the trial against Eugene Castelle and revealed the current leadership of the crime family. Pennisi testified that in 2017, imprisoned for life boss Vic Amuso sent a letter to Underboss Steven Crea which stated that Brooklyn based mobster Michael “Big Mike” DeSantis would take over as acting boss replacing Bronx based Matthew Madonna. The testimony from Pennisi stated that if the Bronx faction refused to step aside, imprisoned boss Amuso had approved of a hit list that included a captain and several members of the Bronx faction. During Pennisi's testimony, he revealed that the Lucchese family operates with a total of seven crews – two in The Bronx, two on Long Island, one in Manhattan, one in New Jersey, and John Castellucci's-Brooklyn crew (formerly Amuso-Casso's old crew), which is now based in Tottenville section of Staten Island. Law-enforcement agents have stated that Brooklyn based mobster Patrick "Patty" Dellorusso is the new acting underboss and that the Bronx-based mobster Andrew DiSimone is the new Consigliere.

On December 16, 2020, soldier John Perna pled guilty to aggravated assault of the husband of Dina Cantin, who has appeared on the Bravo television series, The Real Housewives of New Jersey. Perna was hired by Thomas Manzo, who is the ex-husband of Cantin; Perna carried out the assault in exchange for a discounted price for his wedding reception.

On September 13, 2022, five Lucchese members and associates were indicted and accused of running an extensive and long-running illegal gambling operation. Arrested for the scheme was family soldier Anthony Villani, and associates James "Quick" Coumoutsos, Dennis Filizzola, Michael "Platinum" Praino, and Louis "Tooch" Tucci, Jr. The five men faced charges included racketeering, money laundering, illegal gambling, and attempted extortion. On July 9, 2025, Villani was sentenced to 21 months in prison for racketeering, money laundering and illegal gambling related to his involvement with an illegal online gambling business.

On April 11, 2025, 39 members and associates of the Lucchese crime family New Jersey faction, were charged with racketeering, gambling offenses, money laundering, and other crimes. Those charged included Lucchese ruling panel member George "Georgie Neck" Zappola, captain Joseph R. "Big Joe" Perna, soldier John G. Perna, associate Wayne D. Cross among other associates which included a New Jersey Politician Prospect Park councilman Anand Shah.

On November 13, 2025, Lucchese family member Joseph "Little Joe" Perna along with thirteen others were indicted for running a multimillion New Jersey-based bookmaking and sports gambling network. Those charged alongside Joseph M. Perna, included his two sons Joseph R. Perna, and Anthony M. Perna, his stepson Frank Zito, his nephews Dominic Perna and Michael Cetta, his wife Kimberly Zito and his ex-wife Rosanna Magno among others. The network's illegal gambling profits between 2022 and 2024 was approximately $2 million. Among the athletes who participated in Perna's sports gambling ring were former Rutgers University wrestlers Michael Cetta, who was previously an NCAA state champion for New Jersey, and Nicholas Raimo.

== Historical leadership ==
=== Boss (official and acting) ===
- 1920–1930 — Gaetano "Tommy" Reina — murdered on February 26, 1930
- 1930 — Bonaventura "Joseph" Pinzolo — murdered on September 5, 1930
- 1930–1951 — Tommaso "Tommy" Gagliano — died on February 16, 1951
- 1951–1967 — Thomas "Tommy" Lucchese — died on July 13, 1967
  - Acting 1966–1967 — Carmine Tramunti — stepped down
  - Acting 1967 — Ettore "Eddie" Coco — stepped down
- 1967–1973 — Carmine "Mr. Gribbs" Tramunti — imprisoned in October 1973, on May 7, 1974, sentenced to 15 years in prison, died on October 15, 1978.
  - Acting 1973–1974 — Andimo "Tony Noto" Pappadio — promoted to Underboss
- 1974–1987 — Anthony "Tony Ducks" Corallo — indicted February 1985; convicted November 19, 1986; sentenced January 13, 1987, to 100 years in prison. Stepped down
- 1987–present — Vittorio "Vic" Amuso — arrested in 1991, received a life sentence in January 1993
  - Acting 1991 — Alphonse "Little Al" D'Arco — demoted and became a member of a ruling panel
  - Acting 1994–1998 — Joseph "Little Joe" DeFede — imprisoned in 1998
  - Acting 1998–2000 — Steven "Stevie" Crea — imprisoned on September 6, 2000
  - Acting 2000–2003 — Louis "Louie Bagels" Daidone — imprisoned March 2003, received life sentence in January 2004
  - Acting 2009–2017 — Matthew "Matty" Madonna — indicted 2007 and 2009; indicted 2017 and demoted, sentenced to life in prison 2020
  - Acting 2017–present — Michael "Big Mike" DeSantis

=== Street boss ===
The street boss is considered the go-to guy for the boss and is responsible for passing on orders to lower-ranking members. In some instances a Ruling panel (of capos) substituted the Street boss role.

- 1990–1991 — Alphonse "Little Al" D'Arco — became acting boss
- 1991 Ruling panel — Salvatore Avellino, Anthony Baratta, Frank Lastorino and Alphonse D'Arco — September 21, 1991, D'Arco became a government witness
- 1991–1993 Ruling panel — Salvatore Avellino, Anthony Baratta, Frank Lastorino — Baratta imprisoned June '92, Avellino and Lastorino imprisoned April '93
- 1993–1994 Ruling panel — Joseph DeFede, Steven Crea and Domenico Cutaia — Cutaia indicted in '95
- 2003–2009 Ruling panel — Joseph DiNapoli, Matthew Madonna, Aniello Migliore — DiNapoli and Madonna indicted in '07 and '09
- 2021–2025 Ruling panel — George "Georgie Neck" Zappola and others — Zappola indicted in April 2025.

=== Underboss (official and acting) ===
An underboss, as the name suggests, is a lower-ranking 'boss' and usually considered second in command.

- 1920–1930 — Tommaso "Tommy" Gagliano — promoted to boss
- 1930–1951 — Gaetano "Tommy" Lucchese — promoted to boss
- 1951–1973 — Stefano "Steve" LaSalle — retired, died November 1975
- 1974–1976 — Andimo "Tony Noto" Pappadio — murdered on September 24, 1976
  - Acting 1976–1977 — Paul "Paulie" Vario — stepped down
- 1977–1987 — Salvatore "Tom Mix" Santoro Sr. — imprisoned in the Commission Case
- 1987–1989 — Mariano "Mac" Macaluso — retired in 1989
- 1989–1993 — Anthony "Gaspipe" Casso — fugitive from January 1991 until arrested January 19, 1993; became government witness in 1994
  - Acting 1991–1992 — Anthony "Bowat" Baratta — imprisoned in June 1992.
  - Acting 1994–1995 — Steven Crea — promoted to official Underboss
- 1995–2020 — Steven "Stevie" Crea — acting boss '98–'00; imprisoned '00–'06; indicted 2017, life sentenced on August 27, 2020, demoted
  - Acting 1998–2000 — Eugene "Boopsie" Castelle — imprisoned in November 2000
  - Acting 2000–2002 — Joseph "Joe C." Caridi — indicted on November 14, 2002
  - Acting 2003–2006 — Aniello "Neil" Migliore — stepped down
  - Acting 2017–2020 — Patrick "Patty" Dellorusso
- 2021–present — Frank "Frankie Bones" Papagni

=== Consigliere (official and acting) ===
A consigliere acts as an important adviser to the leader(s) of the Mafia.

- 1931–1953 — Stefano "Steve" LaSalle — promoted to underboss
- 1953–1977 — Vincenzo "Vinny" Rao — imprisoned from 1965 to 1970, retired
  - Acting 1965–1967 — Mariano "Mac" Macaluso
  - Acting 1967–1974 — Paul "Paulie" Vario — imprisoned 1974 to 1976
- 1977–1979 — Vincent "Vinnie Beans" Foceri — died in 1979
- 1980–1996 — Christopher "Christie Tick" Furnari — indicted 1985, sentenced to 100 years in 1987, released September 19, 2014
  - Acting 1985–1987 — Ettore "Eddie" Coco — stepped down
  - Acting 1987 — Aniello Migliore — imprisoned
  - Acting 1987–1989 — Anthony "Gaspipe" Casso — promoted to underboss
  - Acting 1990–1991 — Steven "Stevie" Crea
  - Acting 1992–1993 — Frank "Big Frank" Lastorino — imprisoned in April 1993
  - Acting 1994–1996 — Frank "Frankie Bones" Papagni — imprisoned in September 1996
- 1996–2003 — Louis "Louie Bagels" Daidone — promoted to acting boss in 2000
  - Acting 2000–2003 — Joseph "Joe C." Caridi — became official consigliere
- 2003–2009 — Joseph "Joe C." Caridi — imprisoned 2003–2009
  - Acting 2003–2009 — Joseph "Joey D." DiNapoli — became official consigliere; indicted in '07 and '09
- 2009–2017 — Joseph "Joey D." DiNapoli — sentenced in 2016, to 3 years in prison. Indicted 2017 and demoted
  - Acting 2016–2017 — Dominic "Crazy Dom" Truscello — indicted 2017 and stepped down
  - Acting panel 2017 — Andrew DiSimone and Alfred "Freddy Boy" Santorelli
- 2018–2021 — Andrew DiSimone — stepped down
- 2021 — Patrick "Patty" Dellorusso — stepped down
- 2021–present — Anthony "Bowat" Baratta

== Current members ==
=== Administration ===
- Boss — Vittorio "Vic" Amuso — became boss in 1986 and remains the official boss of the crime family. Amuso has been imprisoned since 1992 and continues to rule the family from prison. It was revealed in May 2019, by government informant and former Lucchese family soldier John Pennisi, that Amuso is still the boss of the family. Amuso had written a letter in 2017, to Underboss Steven Crea which stated that DeSantis would take over as acting boss, replacing Bronx-based Matthew Madonna. If Amuso's orders were not followed he approved of murdering a number of Bronx faction members.
- Acting boss — Michael "Big Mike" DeSantis — became acting boss in 2017, when Vic Amuso sent a letter to underboss Steven Crea which stated that DeSantis would take over as acting boss, replacing Bronx-based Matthew Madonna. If Amuso's orders were not followed he approved of murdering a number of Bronx faction members.
- Underboss — Frank "Frankie Bones" Papagni — became underboss in 2021. Papagni is a longtime Brooklyn faction member.
- Consigliere — Anthony "Bowat" Baratta — became consigliere in 2021. Baratta is the former capo of the Harlem crew.

=== Caporegimes ===
According to the May 2019 testimony of government witness and former Lucchese soldier John Pennisi, the Lucchese family operates with a total of seven crews – two in The Bronx, two on Long Island, one in Manhattan, one in New Jersey, and one in Brooklyn. However, according to 2025 FBI Lucchese family chart, Lubrano, Santorelli operate as Bronx faction captain's with Alfred Santorelli as acting captain. Avellino and DeSena operate as Long Island captain's, with Joseph R. Pena as New Jersey captain and Joseph M. Perna as acting captain.

The Bronx faction

- Joseph "Joey Relay" Lubrano — capo operating in the Bronx. In May 2010, Lubrano was arrested on armed robbery and racketeering charges. The FBI identified him as a caporegime with close ties to mobsters operating in the Arthur Avenue area of the Bronx.
- Anthony "Blue" Santorelli — capo operating in the Bronx. In the 1990s, Santorelli led the Tanglewood Boys, a recruitment gang for the Lucchese family.
  - Acting — Alfred "Freddy Boy" Santorelli — acting capo of his father's Bronx crew.
- (In Prison) Anthony Villani — capo operating in the Bronx and Westchester. On September 13, 2022, Villani and others were indicted on charges of operating an illegal online gambling business. On July 9, 2025, Villani was sentenced to 21 months in prison.

Long Island faction

- Carmine Avellino — born in July 1944. capo of the "Long Island-Queens crew" and brother to Salvatore Avellino. In August 1975, Avellino was convicted for illegal gambling. In May 2014, Avellino was charged with ordering two Lucchese associates to assault a 70-year-old man over a late payment of $100,000 in 2010. On August 12, 2016, Avellino was the last in the case to plead guilty, his associates Daniel Capra and Michael Capra pled guilty earlier. He pleaded guilty to extortion after he attempted to collect an outstanding loan by the use of threats. On May 23, 2017, Avellino was sentenced to one year of house arrest and five years' probation and fined $100,000. His attorney stated during the trial that Avellino had suffered two heart attacks and is suffering from Parkinson's disease.
- Joseph "Joe Cafe" DeSena — capo of a Long Island crew. DeSena operates from Café Napoli in Little Italy. DeSena began his criminal career as an associate in the Gambino family before becoming a member of the Lucchese family. In the early 2010s, DeSena was an associate of Gambino family capo Ignazio "Uncle Iggy" Alonga. His nephew, Pete Tuccio, is a Gambino family associate and former driver for Philadelphia boss Joseph Merlino, whom is currently serving 10 years in prison for extortion.
  - Acting — Anthony "Spanky" Castelle — acting capo of DeSena Long Island crew.

Brooklyn-Staten Island faction

- Ray Argentina — in 2025, Argentina was promoted to capo taking over George Zappola's Brooklyn crew, after Zappola was imprisoned.
- Mario Gallo — took over the Brooklyn crew after Papagni became family Underboss.

Manhattan faction

- Joseph "Torty Jr." Tortorello — capo of the "Prince Street crew". The former capo of the crew Dominic Truscello died in July 2018.

New Jersey faction

- Joseph R. "Big Joe" Perna — capo of the "New Jersey crew" and son of former Lucchese member Michael J. Perna. On April 11, 2025, Perna was charged along with 38 others with racketeering, gambling offenses, money laundering, and other crimes.
  - Acting — Joseph M. "Little Joe" Perna — acting capo of the "New Jersey crew" and son of Lucchese member Ralph Perna.

=== Imprisoned members ===
- Steven Crea — born in July 1947. He had served as a former underboss for the Lucchese family. In August 2020, Crea was sentenced by former U.S. District Judge Cathy Seibel to life imprisonment with a $400,000 fine and $1 million forfeiture, for racketeering conspiracy, murder, murder conspiracy, and for the use of a firearm to commit murder.
- Louis "Louie Bagels" Diadone — born in February 1946. He had served as the former acting boss during the early 2000s. According to prosecutors, in August 1990, Bruno Facciolo was lured to an auto body shop where he was held down by Diadone, and moments later he was stabbed by future-consigliere Frank Lastorino and shot 6 times in the head by Lucchese family capo Richard Pagliarulo.
- Christopher Londonio — born in November 1973. He had served as a soldier for the Lucchese family. In May 2017, Londonio and 18 others were indicted and taken into custody on charges of murder, attempted murder, assault, robbery, extortion, illegal gambling, narcotics trafficking, witness tampering, fraud, money laundering, cigarette trafficking. Prosecutors accused Londonio personally of carrying firearms, participating in extortion, operating illegal gambling businesses and dens, drug trafficking and assaulting an associate of another crime family with a baseball bat. In July 2020, Londonio was sentenced to life imprisonment for conspiracy to distribute narcotics and for the November 2013 murder of Michael Meldish.
- Matthew Madonna — born in November 1935. He had served as the former acting boss for the Lucchese family. During the 1950s and early 1960s, Madonna was allegedly associated with Harlem gang leader Nicky Barnes while Madonna was a heroin dealer himself. In December 1976, Madonna was convicted of conspiracy to import, and possession with intent to distribute heroin, and sentenced to 30 years, he was released in 2005. In May 2017, Madonna was arrested on racketeering and murder charges. Madonna was also accused of the May 2013 attempted murder of Bonanno family soldier Enzo “The Baker” Stagno. Madonna was accused of ordering the November 2013 murder of Michael Meldish over a $100,000 debt. In July 2020, Madonna was sentenced to life imprisonment on charges of racketeering conspiracy, murder in aid of racketeering, conspiracy to commit murder in aid of racketeering, aiding and abetting use of a firearm to commit murder.
- Joseph "Joey Bang Bang" Massaro — born in 1943. He had served as a soldier for the Lucchese family. During the early 1990s, Massaro was implicated by informant Patrick Esposito in the September 1990 murder of Joseph Fiorito who was found shot to death in his car on the Long Island Expressway in Queens, New York. In June 1992, Massaro was indicted for racketeering and murder charges. In October 1993, Massaro was sentenced to life imprisonment for arson, murder, extortion, loansharking, he was fined $240,000 and ordered to pay $104,100 in restitution.
- Marco Minuto — soldier allegedly inducted in around 1995. In May 2001, Minuto was accused of operating a four-year gasoline bootlegging operation with the Russian Mob, selling gasoline to Long Island gas stations, who Alex Lukov had been paying Minuto for protection.
- John "Johnny Boy" Petrucelli — born in 1971. He had served as a soldier for the Lucchese family, and as a member of the Tanglewood Boys. In February 2003, Petrucelli was convicted of the 1995 murder of Paul Cicero and sentenced to life in prison.
- Nicodemo Salvatore "Nicky" Scarfo Jr. — born in June 1965. He had served as a soldier for the Lucchese family. He is the son of former Philadelphia crime family boss Nicky Scarfo Sr.. In October 1989, Scarfo was shot between 5 and 9 times while he dined at a South Philadelphia restaurant, but survived. In October 2011, Scarfo was arrested by the FBI for a scheme to defraud a Texas financial firm out of $12 million. In September 2015, Scarfo was sentenced to 30 years imprisonment for racketeering, securities fraud and wire fraud.
- Martin "Marty" Taccetta — born in May 1951. He had served a captain for the Lucchese family. Taccetta was implicated in the murder of Vincent Craporatta who was beaten to death by men carrying golf clubs in June 1984, but he was acquitted. In August 1993, Taccetta was sentenced to life imprisonment for racketeering and extortion. Taccetta was released from prison in December 2005. Between December 2007 and May 2008, Taccetta and 27 other Lucchese family affiliates were in indicted. as "Operation Heat", and accused of operating an $2.2 billion in sports bets during a 15-month period, racketeering, weapons possession, tax evasion, bribery, money laundering and conspiracy. Taccetta pleaded guilty to first-degree racketeering in relation to the illegal gambling ring. In July 2009, the New Jersey Supreme Court sentenced Taccetta to life in prison.

== Government informants and witnesses ==
- Eugenio "Gino" Giannini – was born in 1906 in Calabria. In 1925, he was imprisoned at Sing Sing for robbery, he began serving time at Dannemora prison for possession of a handgun and larceny in 1928 upon his release. By the early 1930s, he became associated with the American Mafia. In mid 1934, he was arrested for armed robbery and for the May 1934 murder of New York police officer, Arthur Philip Rasmussen. His last known arrest was in 1942 for trafficking narcotics and served over one year in prison. It is noted that Giannini was heavily involved in the narcotic trade from the 1930s until his murder in 1952. In the heroin trade, he was acquainted with Pasquale Moccio, Vincenzo Mauro, Salvatore Shillitani, Giovanni Ormento, and Joseph Valachi. He became an informer around 1950 for the FBN and began informing on his heroin connection, Charles Luciano. It is believed his murder was ordered by Genovese crime family captain Anthony Strollo, who tasked Valachi to murder Giannini. Valachi then ordered Joseph and Pasquale Pagano and Fiore Siano to carry out the shooting on September 20, 1952.
- Dominick "The Gap" Petrilli – former soldier. He served time at Sing Sing prison during the 1920s and befriended future Genovese soldier Joseph Valachi. In 1928, Valachi introduced him to Girolamo Santuccio and Gaetano Gagliano, who was the underboss of the Lucchese family at the time. Petrilli later served as a driver for Gagliano. In 1942, he was deported to Italy after he was convicted of narcotic charges. Ten years later, Petrilli reentered the United States and was murdered one month later in the Bronx by three gunmen, on December 9, 1953. It was later revealed that Petrilli was an acquaintance of the late Dutch Schultz, who had once hidden at his home in Newburgh, New York.
- Henry Hill – he is best known as the subject of the 1990 film Goodfellas. Hill was active from 1955 until his cooperation in 1980, after facing a minimum of 25 years in prison for drug charges. He became associated with Paul Vario and his crew in Brooklyn, and later Jimmy Burke. Hill and Tommy DeSimone were involved in the April 7, 1967 Air France robbery in which $420,000 was taken. The Lufthansa heist was also a robbery at John F. Kennedy International Airport on December 11, 1978. An estimated $5.875 million (equivalent to $29 million in 2025) was stolen from the German airline Lufthansa, with $5 million in cash and $875,000 in jewelry, making it the largest cash robbery committed on American soil at the time. The plot had begun when bookmaker Martin Krugman told Hill Lufthansa flew in currency to its cargo terminal at John F. Kennedy International Airport; Jimmy Burke set the plan in motion, although Hill did not directly take part in the heist. By the late 1970s, he became an alcoholic and cocaine addict, and even sold narcotics himself. Vario disowned him and Burke was planning his murder as he believed Hill would eventually become an informant if he got caught due to his excessive cocaine use. In 1980, Hill was arrested on a narcotics-trafficking charge. With a long sentence hanging over him, Hill agreed to become an informant and signed an agreement with the Strike Force on May 27, 1980. Hill testified against his former associates to avoid impending prosecution and being murdered by his crew. His testimony led to 50 convictions. Hill, his wife Karen Hill, and their two children (Gregg and Gina) entered the U.S. Marshals' Witness Protection Program in 1980, changed their names, and moved to an undisclosed location. Burke was given 12 years in prison for the 1978–79 Boston College point shaving scandal, involving fixing Boston College basketball games. Burke was also later sentenced to life in prison for the murder of scam artist Richard Eaton. Burke died of cancer while serving his life sentence, on April 13, 1996, at the age of 64. Paul Vario received four years for helping Henry Hill obtain a no-show job to get him paroled from prison. Vario was also later sentenced to ten years in prison for the extortion of air freight companies at JFK Airport. He died of respiratory failure on November 22, 1988, at age 73 while incarcerated in the FCI Federal Prison in Fort Worth. Hill died of complications related to heart disease in a Los Angeles hospital, on June 12, 2012, after a long battle with his illness, a day after his 69th birthday.
- Peter "Fat Pete" Chiodo – former capo. Chiodo was initiated into the Lucchese family in 1987. He became a government witness in 1991 after a failed assassination attempt, which resulted in Chiodo being shot 12 times at a gas station in Staten Island. His failed murder attempt was believed to be ordered by Anthony Casso who disapproved of his plea deal in the "Windows case". According to Chiodo, he had turned down several attempts by the government to persuade him into becoming an informer, however the threats against his wife and father eventually persuaded him. As a result of his cooperation with the government, Casso and Lucchese boss Vic Amuso ordered murder contracts on his sister and uncle. His uncle, Frank Signorino, was found shot in the head inside of the trunk of his car in 1993, and his sister was shot several times in 1992 but survived. By 2007, he had testified in seven American Mafia trials, including against Genovese boss Vincent Gigante, and admitted to his involvement in five murders. Chiodo died in 2016.
- Alphonse "Little Al" D'Arco – the first boss, acting or otherwise, of the American Mafia to turn informer. D'Arco was active since the 1950s. He admitted to receiving dozens of murder contracts from Casso and Amuso, including an assignment to "wipe out the entire New Jersey faction", which consisted of 15 men, in 1988. He became the acting boss of the Lucchese family for several months until his cooperation in late 1991. According to D'Arco, he became a government witness as he was responsible for the failed murder attempt on Lucchese capo Peter Chiodo who survived 12 gunshots, and believed he was next to be murdered as a result of "screwing it up". His testimony almost destroyed the Lucchese family. Jerry Capeci and novelist Tom Robbins released a book about D'Arco in October 2013. D'Arco died in 2019.
- Joseph D'Arco – former soldier and son of acting boss Alphonse D'Arco. It is noted that he participated in the February 1990 murder of Anthony DiLapi, an unpredictable Lucchese soldier based in California, after receiving orders from his father.
- Anthony "Tumac" Accetturo – former capo and leader of the Lucchese-New Jersey faction. Accetturo was known for his brawler characteristics on the street and became active with the Lucchese family in 1955. In 1988, he was acquitted of racketeering and other crimes alongside 19 other Lucchese mobsters. At his trial, prosecutors alleged that he controlled most of New Jersey's illegal gambling, drug dealing, loansharking, and credit card scam operations. Though he has denied any involvement in murders, he admitted to being aware of at least 13 murders. According to an informant in 1992, Accetturo ordered a contract on Caesar Vitale, who was murdered after he failed to repay $800,000, which he was given to fund his cocaine business. Accetturo was convicted of racketeering in August 1993 and faced a maximum of 60 years in prison, and a death sentence ordered by the Lucchese family hierarchy in New York. In late 1993, he agreed to become an informer and to provide information for the government. Accetturo was sentenced to 20 years in prison in 1993 and was released in 2002.
- Thomas Angelo Ricciardi –former soldier who was based around Toms River, New Jersey. Like his superior, Anthony Accetturo, he decided to turn informer in 1993. He was also convicted in the August 1993 trial, which targeted the Lucchese family and the New Jersey faction, for racketeering and the 1984 murder of Vincent J. Craparotta Sr., who was beaten to death with a golf club. In September 1993, before he was to appear in a bribery case involving the Newark sanitation department, it was confirmed that he had flipped.
- Frank "Goo Goo" Suppa – former soldier who was based in South Florida. Suppa was a member of Anthony Accetturo's New Jersey faction, however it was later revealed that he was mostly active in Florida. He was indicted in 1985 for several crimes alongside 19 others and was acquitted in 1988. In 1993, he was arrested on cocaine charges, pleaded guilty, and began to cooperate with the government.
- Anthony "Gaspipe" Casso – he is regarded as the most ruthless Lucchese crime family mobster, and arguably one of the most vicious gangsters in history. Casso has been suspected of being involved with dozens of murders Casso had admitted to 15 murders. According to Alphonse D'Arco, he had prepared a hit list of 49 potential informants which was given to him in 1990, and by 1992, ten out of the 49 were murdered. Casso became an associate of Christopher Furnari during the late 1950s and was inducted into the Lucchese family in the 1970s. In 1961, he was arrested for attempted murder and later acquitted. Anthony Corallo appointed him as boss in 1987, however Casso suggested that his longtime friend Vic Amuso should take the reins, with Casso instead becoming consigliere and later underboss at the time of his downfall. It is believed Casso was in charge despite not being the official boss. He became a fugitive in May 1990, two days before he was scheduled to be indicted in a $142 million bid-rigging case and for ordering 11 murders, including conspiring to order three more. Casso was captured by 25 FBI agents in January 1993. While in custody, he planned the murder of Eugene Nickerson, the presiding judge in his case, and tried to figure a way for Lucchese mobsters to ambush his prison transportation bus and then free him. Before his plans were carried out, Amuso banished him from the Lucchese family due to suspicions that Casso was attempting to seize control of the crime family. Casso became an informer in March 1994 and pleaded guilty to extortion, racketeering, and 15 murders. He also admitted to having two NYPD officers on his payroll, who were convicted of murdering eight people on behalf of Casso. Casso died on December 15, 2020.
- Frank "Spaghetti Man" Gioia Jr. – he was initiated into the Lucchese family in October 1991. Gioia was arrested in June 1992 on gun charges and then in 1993 for operating a heroin trafficking ring from Manhattan to Boston. Gioia was planning to murder current Lucchese underboss Steven Crea, along with George Zappola and Frankie Papagni, for the purpose of avoiding a power shift in the Lucchese hierarchy. He was sentenced to seven years in prison and agreed to cooperate in late 1994 while imprisoned, after hearing that his sponsor, Lucchese capo George Zappola and his original sponsor, was planning to murder his father; Gioia was released in 1999. It is noted that by 1998, his testimony secured the convictions of more than 60 American Mafia members and associates, including Louis Vallario and Michael DiLeonardo from the Gambino crime family, and three other captains from the New York crime families. He entered the Witness Protection Program upon his release and relocated to Phoenix, Arizona.
- Frank Gioia Sr. – the father of Frank Gioia Sr. and a former soldier. After facing a contract on his life, he cooperated with the government along with his son in 1994.
- Joseph "Little Joe" DeFede – born in 1934. DeFede was originally an associate of the Colombo crime family, but he renewed his friendship with Vic Amuso and later became inducted into the Lucchese family in 1989. He is the former acting boss, appointed by Amuso in 1993. In 1998, he admitted to involvement in the Lucchese-infiltration of the New York garment district. DeFede was active in Queens and Brooklyn and operated gambling, extortion, and loansharking operations. In his later years, he commented that he and his wife essentially did not have a life and couldn't visit his children in New York due to reprimands of the New York crime families and that he extremely struggled each week in terms of gaining money. He died in Florida in 2012.
- Vincent "Vinny Baldy" Salanardi – former soldier who turned in 2004. In 2002, he was arrested on racketeering and other charges alongside 21 other Lucchese mobsters, he was also overheard discussing a few assaults on a wiretap, and ordered an associate to find a debtor who owed him money, insisting that the associate should "bring him back bloody". He was sentenced to over 11 years in prison and ordered to pay $35,000 in restitution and immediately began cooperating after his arrest.
- Frank Lagano – former soldier. Lagano was arrested in 2004 on gambling and loansharking charges, as part of "Operation Jersey Boyz", it is believed he became an informer shortly after his arrest. In 2007, he was shot to death in East Brunswick, New Jersey.
- Burton Kaplan – former Jewish-associate. In 1973, he was sentenced to four years in prison for theft. It is noted that he acted as a liaison between Lucchese underboss Anthony Casso and two of his NYPD hitman-cops, Stephen Caracappa and Louis Eppolito. In 2004, while serving a 27-year sentence for operating a $10 million marijuana trafficking ring, he decided to cooperate with the government. It was revealed in 2005 that he had invited dozens of American Mafia mobsters to his daughter's wedding as a way of bringing her more clients as she practised law and was a defense attorney, he also admitted to failing his daughter. Kaplan died in July 2009. In 2017, his daughter Deborah Kaplan was appointed as an administrative judge in New York.
- Steven LaPella – former associate. It is believed he became an informer shortly after his February 2008 indictment for racketeering.
- John Pennisi – inducted in April 2013 by Matthew Madonna. In October 2018, he began cooperating with the FBI. Pennisi revealed the 2017 change in family leadership to authorities.

== Factions and territories ==
The Lucchese family operates primarily in New York City and New Jersey, as well as Florida and California. The organization engages in gambling, loansharking, labor racketeering, narcotics distribution, and fraud. The family has also successfully infiltrated the construction, waste, garment, and trucking industries.

- New York City – The family is based in the Bronx and Brooklyn but operates throughout New York and its suburbs.
- New Jersey – A powerful faction of the family operates in North Jersey, including Essex, Union, Monmouth and Morris counties.
- Florida – The family operates in South Florida.

== Activities ==
=== Labor racketeering ===
The Lucchese family used members to take control of various unions in the United States. The members extorted money from the unions by blackmail, strong-arming, violence, and other methods. Similar to the other four crime families of New York City, they worked on controlling entire unions. With the mob having control over a union, they controlled the entire market. Bid-rigging allows the mob to get a percentage of the income on the construction deal, only allowing certain companies to bid on jobs after they pay them first. The mob also allows companies to use non-union workers to work on jobs, in which case the companies must give a kickback to the mob. Unions give mob members jobs on the books to show a legitimate source of income. The Mafia members get into high union positions and embezzle money from the organization.

- Clothes manufacturing – In the Garment District of Manhattan, the Union of Needletrades, Industrial and Textile Employees Locals 10, 23, 24, and 25 were controlled by members of the Lucchese family. Lucchese associates would extort the businesses and organize strikes. Today, some unions are still working for the family.
- Kosher meat companies – In the early 1960s Giovanni "Johnny Dio" Dioguardi merged Consumer Kosher Provisions Company and American Kosher Provisions Inc. Dio was able to control a large portion of the Kosher food market, forcing supermarkets to buy from his companies at his prices.
- Food distribution – At the Hunts Point Cooperative Market in the Hunts Point section of the Bronx, the Lucchese family controlled unions involved in the food distribution industry.
- Airport services and freight handling – At John F. Kennedy International Airport, LaGuardia, and Newark Liberty, the unions were controlled by the Lucchese family.
- Construction – Teamsters unions in New York City and New Jersey have been under Lucchese family control. Mason Tenders Locals 46, 48, and 66 were controlled by the old Vario Crew.
- Newspaper production and delivery – In November 2009, Manhattan District Attorney Robert Morgenthau sent search warrants to investigate the Newspaper and Mail Deliverers Union. This union controlled circulation, production, and delivery offices at The New York Times, The New York Post, The New York Daily News, and El Diario La Prensa. When the Cosa Nostra took control over the union, the price and costs for newspapers increased. Charges were brought against many union members, as well as the former union President, Douglas LaChance, who was accused of being a Lucchese crime family associate. In the 1980s, LaChance was convicted on labor racketeering charges and served five years in prison. He was also involved in the Manhattan 1990s case in which the New York Post was being strong-armed into switching its delivery companies, but was acquitted.

=== French Connection ===
The French Connection Crew (1967–1973) was an organization, closely aligned with the Lucchese family, who were responsible for the theft of approximately $70 million in heroin taken from the NYPD property room.

- Virgil Alessi
- Louis Cirillo
- Anthony Loria
- Vincent Papa
- Anthony Pasero

== List of murders committed/ordered by the Lucchese family ==
| Name | Date | Rank | Reason |
|---|---|---|---|
| Dominick "The Gap" Petrilli | December 9, 1953 | Soldier | Petrilli was shot 3 times and killed inside of a bar in the Bronx after it was revealed that he had been cooperating with law enforcement. |
| Frank "Chick 99" Callace | November 15, 1954 | Soldier | Callace was shot twice in the head and killed inside of his vehicle located at Throggs Neck in the Bronx, New York, as it was revealed that he was cooperating with the Federal Bureau of Narcotics. |
| Benjamin "Benny the Cringe" Indiviglio | December 30-31, 1965 | Associate | Indiviglio and his friend, Robert Belleus, were shot and killed inside of a parked car located at 1023 Quincy Avenue in the Throgs Neck section of the Bronx in New York. It is believed Indiviglio was killed in relation to narcotics trafficking. |
| Anthony Mancuso | September 5, 1967 | Soldier | Mancuso served as a soldier for the Lucchese family. Mancuso is also the father to Michael "The Nose" Mancuso, the current boss of the Bonanno family. Mancuso was targeted by 8 shots by using a .22-caliber rifle inside of a bar in the Bronx located at 2890 Buhre Avenue, and later died at the Jacobi Medical Center. |
| William "Billy Bats" Bentavena | June 11, 1970 | Soldier | Bentavena was murdered by Thomas DeSimone with assistance of Jimmy Burke and Henry Hill. In 1962, Bentavena was sentenced to 15 years in prison, as part of the "Ormento Group", a heroin smuggling ring, involving John Ormento, Anthony Mirra and Carmine Galante. Bentavena was released in May 1970, and two weeks later, DeSimone confronted Bentavena at The Suite nightclub located at 111-16 Queens Boulevard in Forest Hills, New York, which was owned by Lucchese family associate, Henry Hill, and DeSimone proceeded to pistol whip Bentavena with his gun, before he was beaten to death by using a shovel and tire iron. |
| James "Jimmy Doyle" Plumeri | September 17, 1971 | Soldier | Plumeri was strangled and suffocated to death possibly due to an inner feud within the Lucchese family. |
| Thomas Barbusca and John Coiro | June 22, 1974 | Soldier | It is believed Carmine Persico, the boss of the Colombo family since 1973 until his death in 2019, had asked Christopher "Christie Tick" Furnari for assistance for killing Colombo family associate, John Coiro, Vic Amuso and Anthony Casso allegedly volunteered to kill Coiro. Amuso and Casso sat in a stolen car and waited for Coiro to exit a club, which he did, however Coiro brought his friend, Thomas Barbusca. As both men exited the club, Amuso walked up to them and shot them by using a shotgun. The murders of Barbusca and Coiro is believed to have been Amuso's first murder for the Lucchese family, prior to joining the Lucchese family, Amuso was an associate in the Colombo family and was aligned with Joey "Crazy Joe" Gallo and was transferred to the Lucchese family following Gallo's murder in April 1972. |
| Lee Schleifer | 1975 | Associate | According to information by Anthony Casso, he was tasked by Christopher "Christie Tick" Furnari, whom would later became the consigliere for the Lucchese family during the 1980s and 1990s, to murder Schleifer as Furnari labelled him as a cooperating witness with narcotic agents. Schleifer was lured to a social club belonging to Bonanno family soldier, Ronnie Carlucci, where Casso shot him in the head with a silenced .22 calibre handgun. |
| Andimo "Tony Noto" Pappadio | September 24, 1976 | Soldier | It is believed Pappadio was shot and killed outside of his home located at 121 Eva Drive in Lido Beach, New York due to an internal power struggle within the Lucchese family. |
| Michael "Mikey Muscles" DiCarlo | May 16, 1978 | Associate | It is believed DiCarlo was murdered by the DeMeo crew from the Gambino family as DiCarlo was accused of raping a young boy, in turn the order for DiCarlo's murder came from a captain in the Lucchese family and was performed by Roy DeMeo and his crew, with them being paid $5000. DiCarlo was shot, stabbed and beaten to death with a hammer. |
| Parnell Steven "Stacks" Edwards | December 18, 1978 | Associate | Edwards was involved in the Lufthansa heist along with Jimmy Burke and he was responsible for disposing of the getaway vehicle, however Edwards failed to do so, and he was shot 6 times in the head and killed by Thomas DeSimone and Angelo Sepe several days after the heist, located in an apartment at 09‐16 120th Street in the Ozone Park section of Queens in New York. |
| Martin Krugman | January 6, 1979 | Associate | It is believed Krugman was the first person to notify Henry Hill and the Burke crew about the Lufthansa heist. Krugman was allegedly murdered and dismembered by Angelo Sepe and Burke at a warehouse in Queens, New York, belonging to former Bonanno family capo, Vincent Asaro, after Krugman demanded $500,000 from Burke for the heist. |
| Thomas DeSimone | January 14, 1979 | Associate | It is believed DeSimone was murdered by the Gambino family as retribution for the murders of Gambino family associate, Ronald "Foxy" Jerothe, and Gambino family soldier, William "Billy Batts" Bentvena. DeSimone had murdered both men without the approval of the New York families and he was subsequently murdered because of this. |
| Richard Eaton | January 17, 1979 | Associate | Eaton was reportedly an con artist from Florida. Eaton was tortured and killed by Jimmy Burke as Eaton had scammed between $325,000 and $250,000 from Burke for a fake cocaine scam. |
| Theresa Ferrara | February 10, 1979 | Civilian | Ferrara was the girlfriend of Thomas DeSimone, whom disappeared in January 1979. It is believed Ferrara was murdered for participating in a scam targeting Jimmy Burke. |
| Louis Cafora & Joanna Cafora | March 8, 1979 | Civilian/Associate | Cafora and his wife were murdered by the Burke crew as Burke viewed Cafora as a liability due to gossiping about the Lufthansa heist. |
| Joe "Buddha" Manri | May 15, 1979 | Associate | Manri was involved in the Lufthansa heist along with Jimmy Burke. It is believed Manri was murdered by the Burke crew. |
| Robert McMahon | May 16, 1979 | Associate | McMahon had participated in the Lufthansa heist alongside Jimmy Burke and he was likely killed by the Burke crew. |
| Paolo LiCastri | June 13, 1979 | Associate | LiCastri was an associate of the Gambino family and was involved in heroin trafficking. LiCastri had served as the liaison from between the Gambino family and the Burke crew, overseeing that the Gambino family received $200,000 from the Lufthansa heist. |
| Vincent Craparotta | June 12, 1984 | Associate | Craparotta was beaten to death by Thomas Ricciardi, Martin Taccetta and Michael Ryan by using golf clubs outside of his car dealership located at 337 Route 9, Toms River in New Jersey. It is believed Craparotta was killed to send a message to his nephew's into paying tribute money from their video poker machine business. |
| Angelo Sepe & Joanne Lombardo | July 18, 1984 | Associate/Soldier/Civilian | Sepe was closely affiliated with the Burke crew for many years. Sepe was involved in several murders ordered by Jimmy Burke and may have been killed by the Burke crew to tie up any loose ends, although another theory is that Sepe was murdered for robbing a drug dealer associated with the Lucchese family. Sepe's 19-year old girlfriend was also shot and killed. The bodies of Sepe and Lombardo were found in a basement apartment located on 8869 20th Avenue in Bensonhurst, Brooklyn. |
| Albert "Albie" Lattanzi | August 1984 | Associate | Lattanzi was an associate in the Nicky Corozzo crew from the Gambino family, and was shot and killed by Lucchese family associate, Todd Alvino, allegedly over an argument of a female. |
| Vincent Albano | July 5, 1985 | Associate | Albano was involved in an altercation with Genovese family associate, Herbert Pate, with Albano accusing Pate of stealing from their heroin trafficking operation. Pate shot Albano several times in his face, chest and back, with a handgun provided from Anthony Casso. Albano had previously served as a former narcotics detective and had served on the police force from between 1958 and 1970. Albano had plotted with Tate to steal the French Connection heroin from the police property room. |
| Israel Greenwald | February 10, 1986 | Civilian | Greenwald was a Jewish jeweller. Prosecutors alleged Greenwald was set to testify in a fraud case, and his murder was ordered by Anthony Casso. According to the testimony of former Lucchese family associate-turned informant, Burton Kaplan, Frank Santora had paid NYPD detectives, Stephen Caracappa and Louis Eppolito, $30,000 to murder him. Greenwald was pulled over by the detectives, who then took him to the Nostrand Avenue garage of Peter Franzone, where Caracappa and Santora shot Greenwald to death. |
| Frank DeCicco | April 13, 1986 | Underboss | DeCicco served as the underboss of the Gambino family to John Gotti. It is believed DeCicco was killed in a car bomb due to a mistaken identity, another man identified as Frank Bellino, was injured but survived, located at a social club in Dyker Heights, Brooklyn near the corner of Bay 8th Street and 86th Street. Gotti was the real target and was marked for death as he had orchestrated the murder of the previous Gambino family boss, Paul Castellano, without the approval of the other New York crime families. |
| Vladimir Reznikov | June 13, 1986 | Associate | Marat Balagula, the leader of the Russian Mafia in Brooklyn, was allegedly threatened by Reznikov, Balagula sought help from the Lucchese family, in turn the Lucchese family agreed to have Reznikov murdered, Reznikov was shot to death in his car located at 1130 Brighton Beach Avenue, Brooklyn. |
| James Hydell | September 1986 | Associate | It is believed Hydell was hired by John Gotti and Angelo Ruggiero to murder Anthony Casso, Ruggiero allegedly enlisted Michael "Mickey Boy" Paradiso to perform the murder, who in turn ordered Hydell and his crew to perform the task. Hydell had allegedly shot Casso, who survived, by stumbling into a Chinese restaurant. Casso ordered NYPD detectives, Stephen Caracappa and Louis Eppolito, to deliver Hydell to a house located at 2419 E 73rd St, Brooklyn, NY, where Hydell was tortured and shot to death by Casso, whom had shot Hydell around 15 times. |
| Anthony "Buddy" Luongo | November/December 1986 | Captain | According to Al D'Arco, Loungo was part of a power play with Salvatore "Tom Mix" Santoro to take over control of the Lucchese family. It is believed Amuso and Casso orchestrated Luongo's murder and he was shot 2 times and killed by Bobby Amuso, the brother of Vic Amuso and a captain in the Lucchese family. Luongo had been lured to the 19th hole bar located on the corner of 86th Street and 14th Avenue where he was murdered. |
| Nicholas Guido | December 25, 1986 | Civilian | Guido, a 26-year-old telephone engineer and civilian, was shot and killed. Guido was killed as a case of mistaken identity, as Guido shared the same name as the preparator who attempted to kill Casso. Guido was murdered outside his mother's home located at 17th Street in Park Slope, Brooklyn. Corrupt NYPD detectives, Louis Eppolito and Stephen Caracappa, provided Casso with the wrong address for the intended target. In January 2015, the mother of Guido, Pauline Pipitone, was given $5 million in a settlement by New York City. |
| Carmine Varriale/Frank Santoro | September 3, 1987 | Soldier & Associate | Killed outside a social club in Bath Beach, Brooklyn, because he had tried to avenge his brother's murder. 51-year-old Lucchese associate Frank Santoro was also killed. The hit team consisted of Frank Smith Sr, Frank Smith Jr, and Michael Cilone. |
| John Otto Heidel | October 1987 | Associate | Shot to death in Oct 1987 while fixing a flat tire on his car after it was believed he was cooperating with law enforcement. |
| Joseph Martino | 1988 | Associate | Suffocated to death after suspected he was cooperating with law enforcement. |
| Eustachio "Leo" Giammona | June 1988 | Soldier | Shot to death while sitting behind the steering wheel of his car, driving along West 3rd Street in Brooklyn. He was a drug trafficker and related to John Gambino. |
| Sorecho "Sammy the Arab" Nalo | October 25, 1988 | Associate | Nalo was an associate of the Rochester crime family and the organizer of the Pierre Hotel robbery It is believed Nalo was shot and killed at his travel agency business office for encroaching on illegal gambling territory belonging to Spiro Velentzas, a Greek gangster. The murder of Nalo was assigned to Lucchese family capo, Pete Chiodo, who tasked Michael "Baldy Mike" Spinelli to murder Nalo. |
| Angelo Sigona | December 7, 1988 | Civilian | Sigona had dated the daughter of Casso's neighbor, and the neighbor had asked Casso to murder Sigona as his daughter did not want to date Sigona and claimed he had harassed her. Casso had received permission from Lucchese family boss, Vic Amuso, to murder Sigona. Casso assigned the murder to Lucchese family capo, Pete Chiodo, who in turn ordered Michael DeSantis and Richard Pagliarulo to murder him. Sigona was found shot to death in a car in Brooklyn. |
| Thomas "Red" Gilmore | February 6, 1989 | Associate | Gilmore served as an associate of the Lucchese family whom was formerly associated with the Paul Vario crew, he had operated a chop shop and limousine business. Gilmore was shot 3 times in the head, as the administration believed he was cooperating with law enforcement, Amuso ordered his murder and the murder was orchestrated by Louis "Louis Bagels" Daidone. |
| Michael Pappadio | May 13, 1989 | Soldier | In May 1992, Al D'Arco testified that Pappadio, along with Amuso and Casso, were involved in a dispute involving the control of the garment district rackets, however Pappadio refused to step down, therefore Casso and Amuso subsequently ordered his murder. D'Arco testified that himself and 3 other Lucchese family affiliates waited for Pappadio to return to his office at a Brooklyn bagel shop, located at Rockaway Boulevard in South Ozone Park, Queens, and when he returned, Lucchese family solder George Zappola had fatally shot Pappadio in the head using a .22-caliber pistol. |
| Julius Calder | June 2, 1989 | Associate | According to the testimony of Casso, Genovese family soldier, Ralph Gigante, had asked assistance from Casso regarding the whereabouts of 74-year old Calder so he could be murdered. Casso asked for the approval from Genovese family boss, Vincent Gigante, to murder Calder, which was approved, and according to Casso, he had supervised the Calder murder. |
| Robert Kubecka and Donald Barstow | August 11, 1989 | Civilian | Barstow and Kubecka were business owners of a waste hauling company based in Suffolk County, Long Island. It is believed Barstow and Kubecka were ordered murdered by Casso for refusing extortion tactics aimed at their carting company, and for the possibility of testifying against the Lucchese family, and other crime families based in New York, regarding the control of the waste management sector. In February 1994, Sal Avellino pleaded guilty to conspiring to commit the murders of Barstow and Kubecka, and he was released in February 2004. Law enforcement have said the killers were Frank "Frankie the Pearl" Federico and Rocco Vitulli, who shot Barstow and Kubecka at their office in East Northport, New York. In July 1998, judge Leonard Silverman awarded a total sum of $10.8 million to the families of Barstow and Kubecka. |
| John Petrucelli | September 13, 1989 | Associate/Soldier | It is believed Petrucelli was murdered as a result of keeping refuge and refusing to murder Gus Farace, who had murdered Everett E. Hatcher, by using a .357 Magnum handgun, an undercover DEA agent in February 1989. At the time, Hatcher was investigating Farace and Gerald "Jerry" Chilli, a soldier for the Bonanno family, for cocaine trafficking and bribing state parole board members. Hatcher had met Farace in Staten Island to discuss the purchase of several ounces of cocaine, where Farace shot Hatcher 3 or 4 times in the head and killed him. |
| John "Sonny" Morrissey | September 17, 1989 | Civilian/Associate | 35-year old Morrissey had served as the shop steward of Local 580 of the Architectural and Ornamental Ironworkers Union. Morrissey was allegedly responsible for collecting the monies for Amuso and the Lucchese family interest within the New York City Housing Authority for the windows replacement scheme. It is believed Amuso was concerned of Morrissey cooperating if he had gotten indicted during the "Windows Case." According to the information from Casso, Amuso and Casso assigned the murder contract to Lucchese family capo, Pete Chiodo, who in turn ordered Richard Pagliarulo and Thomas Carew to kill Morrissey. Morrissey's body was found buried and rolled in a carpet in a wooded area in Morris County, New Jersey. |
| Anthony DiLapi | February 4, 1990 | Soldier | Casso allegedly believed that DiLapi was disloyal and cooperating with authorities. Casso had sent word to DiLapi regarding attending a meeting together, however DiLapi refused. Corrupt NYPD detectives, Louis Eppolito and Stephen Caracappa used police computers to locate Anthony Dilapi, in turn Casso had orchestrated the murder of DiLapi and he was shot 9 times and killed in the garage of his new apartment building, in Hollywood, California. |
| James Bishop | May 17, 1990 | Civilian/Associate | Bishop had served as the head of the Painters' Union District Council 9 and as a Democratic district leader based in Queens, New York. Bishop had agreed to cooperate before a Manhattan grand jury in May, 1990. Bishop was shot at least 3 times in the head and chest located on 62-01 Powells Cove Boulevard in Whitestone, Queens, Bishop was sitting inside of his Lincoln sedan vehicle, reportedly waiting to pick his friend up in Whitestone. |
| Michael Salerno | June 5, 1990 | Captain | Salerno served as a captain based in the Bronx for the Lucchese family. Law enforcement have said Salerno was related to former Genovese family boss, Anthony Salerno. According to Casso, Salerno had a close and friendly relationship with Anthony "Tony Ducks" Corallo and shortly after Corallo's imprisonment, Casso and Amuso discovered that Salerno was stealing money for himself during the Lucchese family infiltration of the garbage business in New York City. Salerno was found shot in the heart and stabbed in the throat inside the trunk of his Jaguar vehicle, located at 2742 Westervelt Avenue, in Baychester, Bronx. |
| Bruno Facciola | August 24, 1990 | Soldier | Facciola is known for his involvement in the murder of Thomas DeSimone. It is believed Facciolo was suspected of being an informant. Facciolo was lured to a garage repair shop in Bensonhurst, Brooklyn, where he was held down by Louis "Louie Bagels" Daidone, before he was stabbed by Frank "Big Frank" Lastorino and shot 6 times in the head and chest by Lucchese family captain, Richard "The Toupee" Pagliarulo. After his murder, Daidone stuffed a canary inside of his mouth, which served as a warning to anyone else who might attempt to cooperate with the government. Lastorino had allegedly reported back to Casso and Amuso that Facciola had been killed. The body of Facciola was found in the trunk of his 1985 Mercury sedan vehicle by federal agents located on East 55th Street in Canarsie, Brooklyn. |
| Edward Lino | November 6, 1990 | Captain | Lino served as a captain in the Gambino family under John Gotti, he was also a powerful drug dealer within the New York area. Lino was shot 9 times and killed inside of his Mercedes-Benz vehicle by Stephen Caracappa, after he was pulled over by Caracappa and his partner, Louis Eppolito, at the Belt Parkway in Brooklyn. The NYPD duo were allegedly paid between $65,000 and $75,000 for the Lino murder. According to the source, Lino was possibly murdered as the Gambino family had attempted to murder Casso, or Lino was killed as revenge for John Gotti's December 1985 unsanctioned murder of former Gambino family boss, Paul Castellano. |
| Larry Taylor and Al Visconti | February-March, 1991 | Associate | Taylor and Visconti, associates of the Lucchese family, were also friends of Lucchese family soldier, Bruno Facciola, whom was also murdered in August 1990, had planned to avenge his murder. Lucchese family acting boss, Al D'arco, was assigned the murder contract and ordered Patrick "Patty Red" Dellorusso and Thomas "Tommy Red" Anzellotto to murder Taylor, which occurred on February 5, 1991, Taylor was found shot multiple times in his car in Brooklyn. 51-year old Visconti was found at his apartment located on 2020 East 41st Street in Brooklyn, shot several times in the groin and his head. |
| Bartholomew "Bobby" Boriello | April 13, 1991 | Captain/Soldier | Boriello was a member of the Gambino family, and once served as the bodyguard and driver for John Gotti. Boriello was shot 7 times and killed outside his home located on Bay 29th Street in Bensonhurst, Brooklyn, possibly due to a rivalry between the Lucchese and Gambino families. In August 2015, the family of Boriello were awarded $1.5 million in a settlement. |
| Anthony Fava | September, 1991 | Civilian | Fava was a house architect and planning board chairman for the village of Greenwood Lake, New York, and whom had built Casso's home located at 139 Bassett Avenue, Mill Basin, Brooklyn. It is believed Casso ordered his murder as Fava demanded full payment for his architectural work. |
| Patrick Testa | December 2, 1992 | Soldier | Testa was a soldier in the Lucchese family, and is related to Joey Testa, a notorious hitman for the Gambino-turned Lucchese family. It is believed Casso ordered the murder of Testa, possibly due to a long term rivalry, Casso allegedly convinced Vic Amuso that Testa was a liability, however this was just a rouse to murder his enemy, another possibility is that the murder of Testa was part of a plan to get Amuso to approve contracts on Gambino family members. Testa was shot 9 times and killed, allegedly by Tommy Jones using a 9-millimeter handgun, an alleged associate of the Los Angeles family, at a garage repair shop located at 432 E. 89th St. in Brooklyn. |
| Frank Signorino | February 2, 1993 | Civilian | Signorino was the uncle to Peter Chiodo, a Lucchese family captain-turned informant. Signorino was found strangled to death inside the trunk of his car located on Vermont Street and Flatlands Avenue in Brooklyn. |
| Joseph Schiro-Scarpa | March 20, 1995 | Associate/Soldier | Scarpa was the son of Greg Scarpa, a powerful capo in the Colombo family. Scarpa had been involved in a drug dispute with the Gambino family. Scarpa was shot twice in the head by Gambino family associate, Vincent Rizzuto, whilst he sat inside a vehicle located on Brown Street in Sheepshead Bay, Brooklyn. Russell Carlucci and Ronald Carlucci, associates of the Lucchese family, had also participated in the murder. |
| Paul Cicero | June 20, 1995 | Associate | Cicero was stabbed in the abdomen and killed located at the Morris Park neighborhood of the Bronx in New York by John "Johnny Boy" Petrucelli as for retribution for the shooting and attempted murder of Darin Mazzarella by Genovese family associate Michael Zanfardino, the cousin of Cicero. In February 2003, Petrucelli was sentenced to life imprisonment for the murder of Cicero. Former Lucchese family acting boss Joseph DeFede had met with Genovese family boss Liborio Bellomo and former Genovese family underboss Michele Generoso to settle the dispute between the Tanglewood Boys and Zanfardino. |
| Anthony Placido | 1996 | Associate | Placido was an associate in the crew belonging to Gambino family capo Nicholas Corozzo. Placido was shot and killed by Lucchese family associate, Robert Arena, in turn Corozzo ordered the murder of Arena and he was shot and killed on January 26, 1996. |
| Patrick Fahey | November 12, 1996 | Civilian | Fahey was found shot in the head and tortured as it was believed that Fahey had been dating the wife of a drug dealer from Queens with ties to the Lucchese family. |
| Roy Ogden | December 21, 1996 | Civilian | Ogden was reportedly robbed, shot and killed by James Mitchell and Glenn Rivers, both men were allegedly members in an unofficial crew headed by Lucchese family soldier, Anthony Tortorello. |
| Ann Marie Sherman | April 23, 1998 | Civilian | Sherman was shot and killed by Robert A. Pasquince, an associate in the Lucchese family. Pasquince had shot Sherman once in the chest at the Subway sandwich shop in South Pasadena, Florida, and retrieved nearly $280 from the cash register. Pasquince was sentenced to life imprisonment. |
| Peter Lanza | August 1999 | Associate | Lanza was shot and killed inside of his home in Gravesend, Brooklyn. Charles DiGirolamo was suspected as the perpetrator. |
| Anthony DiGirolamo and Charles DiGirolamo | April 2000 | Associate | Both men possibly served as associates of the Lucchese family. The motives and killers of the DiGirolamo brother's remain unknown, although it was reported that they were found shot to death at 1794 W Fifth St. in Brooklyn. |
| Thomas Pennini | July 11, 2002 | Soldier | Pennini served as an associate of the Lucchese family. It is believed Pennini was shot and killed, while walking his dog in the Bronx, by Frank Santoro, by using a .45 caliber handgun, on Mahan Avenue in the Pelham Bay, Bronx, due to a personal dispute. In early 2008, Santoro was sentenced to 6 years in prison for the Pennini murder. |
| Frank Lagano | April 12, 2007 | Soldier | Lagano served as a soldier for the Lucchese family. Lagano was found shot twice in the head and killed, located at Route 18 in East Brunswick, New Jersey. It is believed Lagano was murdered as he was a government informant and that his status as an informant was breached and leaked by Michael Mordaga, the former Bergen County Chief of Detectives in return for a bribe. |
| James Donovan | July 2, 2010 | Associate | Donovan was a self-employed check casher and associate of the Lucchese family. It is believed Donovan was shot once in his leg and later bled to death, as part of a botched armed robbery, outside of a garage repair shop in Gravesend, Brooklyn. The robbers were alleged to have stolen approximately $200,000 in cash. The participants were believed to have been Nunzio DeCarlo, who died of a drug overdose at his home in Staten Island in October 2010, Hector Pagan, who received an 11-year sentence in exchange for his cooperation as a government witness, and the remaining participants were Luigi Grasso and Richard Riccardi, Grasso received a 38-year prison sentence and Riccardi was sentenced to 36 years in prison, both were sentenced in August 2014. |
| Michael Meldish | November 15, 2013 | Associate | Meldish was allegedly a leader of the East Harlem Purple Gang, a defunct organized crime group that was semi-independent of the American Mafia and was later absorbed by the Genovese Family. Meldish owed $100,000 in gambling debt to the acting boss at the time, Matthew Madonna, and refused to pay it. As a result, Madonna and underboss Steven Crea Sr. ordered the hit. That night, the 62-year old Meldish was parked on Ellsworth Avenue in the Bronx and was shot in the head by Lucchese associate Terrence Caldwell with soldier Christopher Londonio as his getaway driver. A federal investigation ensued which led to indictments in 2017, leading to Madonna, Crea, Caldwell, and Londonio all eventually being sentenced to life in prison in 2020. It is the last known hit ordered by any of the American Mafia families. |

== In popular culture ==
- In the 1981 film Gangster Wars, Gaetano "Tommy Brown" Lucchese was played by actor Jon Polito.
- The 1990 film Goodfellas was based on Henry Hill's recollections about his involvement with The Vario Crew of the Lucchese family.
- In the 1991 film Mobsters, Tommy Reina was played by actor Christopher Penn.
- In the 1991 film Out for Justice, the William Forsythe character "Richard Madano" was allegedly based on Lucchese mobster Matthew Madonna.
- In the 1999–2007 HBO TV show The Sopranos, main character Anthony Soprano was partially based on Lucchese mobster Michael Taccetta.
- In 2005 and 2006, a fictionalized version of The Tanglewood Boys was featured on CSI: NY, in episode 1.13 "Tanglewood" and in episode 2.20 "Run Silent, Run Deep".
- The 2006 film Find Me Guilty was based on the 1980s trial of 20 members of the Lucchese Jersey Crew.
- In the 2007 film American Gangster, the Armand Assante character Dominic Cattano was based on Lucchese mobster Carmine Tramunti.
- In the 2008 Rockstar North video game Grand Theft Auto IV, the fictional Lupisella family resembles on the Lucchese family. The Lupisella family is mainly based in Bohan, the Grand Theft Auto IV version of the Bronx, and is operating in Liberty City, the game's version of New York City.

== See also ==
- Crime in New York City
- Italians in New York City
- List of Italian Mafia crime families

== Sources ==
=== Books ===
- Capeci, Jerry. The Complete Idiot's Guide to the Mafia. Indianapolis: Alpha Books, 2002. ISBN 0-02-864225-2
- Critchley, David. The Origin of Organized Crime in America: The New York City Mafia, 1891–1931
- Davis, John H., Mafia Dynasty: The Rise and Fall of the Gambino Crime Family. New York: HarperCollins, 1993. ISBN 0-06-016357-7
- DeStefano, Anthony. The Last Godfather: Joey Massino & the Fall of the Bonanno Crime Family.
- DeVico, Peter J. The Mafia Made Easy: The Anatomy and Culture of La Cosa Nostra. Tate Publishing, 2007. ISBN 1-60247-254-8
- Eppolito, Louis, Mafia Cop: The Story of an Honest Cop whose Family Was the Mob. ISBN 1-4165-2399-5
- Jacobs, James B., Panarella, Christopher and Worthington, Jay. Busting the Mob: The United States Vs. Cosa Nostra. New York: NYU Press, 1994. ISBN 0-8147-4230-0
- Jacobs, James B., Friel, Coleen and Radick, Robert. Gotham Unbound: How New York City Was Liberated from the Grip of Organized Crime. New York: NYU Press, 1999. ISBN 0-8147-4247-5.
- Lawson, Guy, and Oldham, William. The Brotherhoods: The True Story of Two Cops Who Murdered for the Mafia. ISBN 978-0-7432-8944-3
- Mass, Peter. The Valachi Papers, New York: Pocket Books, 1986. ISBN 0-671-63173-X.
- Maas, Peter, Underboss: Sammy the Bull Gravano's Story of Life in the Mafia. New York: HarperCollins Publishers, 1997. ISBN 0-06-093096-9
- Raab, Selwyn (2005). Five Families: The Rise, Decline, and Resurgence of America's Most Powerful Mafia Empires. New York: Thomas Dunne Books. ISBN 978-0-312-30094-4. OCLC 60326528.
- Rudolph, Robert C. The Boys from New Jersey: How the Mob Beat the Feds. New York: William Morrow and Company Inc., 1992. ISBN 0-8135-2154-8
- Volkman, Ernest, Gangbusters: The Destruction of America's Last Great Mafia Dynasty New York, Avon Books, 1998 ISBN 0-380-73235-1

=== Reports ===
- Zazzali, James R. (September 1990). 21st Annual Report (PDF) (Report). State of New Jersey Commission of Investigation. Archived from the original (PDF) on June 1, 2021 – via Government of New Jersey.
- Schiller, Francis E. (May 2004). The Changing Face of Organize Crime in New Jersey (PDF) (Report). State of New Jersey Commission of Investigation. Archived from the original (PDF) on April 17, 2016 – via Government of New Jersey.
