= Frank Gioia Jr. =

American businessman and former mobster

Frank Gioia Jr
- Born: August 27, 1967 (age 59)
- Other names: Frank Capri; Baby Face; Spaghetti Man
- Occupations: Mobster; Businessman
- Allegiance: Lucchese Crime Family

Frank Gioia Jr (born August 27, 1967) aka Frank Capri is an American former mobster who was a made man in the Lucchese Crime Family in New York City and was a figure in a multimillion-dollar heroin trade in New York.

== Biography ==
Frank Gioia Jr., was born in 1967, became a "made man" within the infamous Lucchese Crime Family in New York City at the age of 24. He is the grandson of Nunzi Russo, a man who ran a social club on Grand Street in the 1960s and 1970s that fronted a bookmaking operation. His father, Frank Gioia Sr., was a "made man" in the Genovese crime family. Between 1993 and the early 2000s, he collaborated with law enforcement agencies and provided testimony against organized crime figures. His cooperation resulted in the arrests of over 70 mafia members, including soldiers and captains, and contributed to the resolution of several mysterious murders. In recognition of his assistance, federal authorities granted him a new identity and enrolled him in the Federal Witness Protection Program.

In 2000, Gioia appeared in Arizona as a businessman, with a new government-issued ID. He has described accounts of his past as "false and defamatory."

Gioia is in relationship with Tawny Costa and they have 2 children together.

== Business Activities ==
In the early 2000s Gioia started business Real Estate and Restaurant. When the housing market crashed in 2008, Gioia shifted his focus to becoming a commercial developer and began reaching out to owners of shopping malls.

In 2009, Gioia, entered into an agreement with renowned American singer and songwriter Toby Keith, granting him the rights to use Keith's name for a chain of restaurants throughout various cities in the United States. In return, Keith received financial compensation for the naming rights. Over the subsequent years, Gioia established more than 20 Toby Keith restaurants. However, issues began to surface with the restaurants starting in 2014. In January of that year, the location in Dallas, Texas, abruptly closed without any notification to employees, vendors, or local partners, with failure to pay rent cited as the cause. In March 2014, the Tucson, Arizona, location also shut down unexpectedly for the same reason. Subsequently, other locations followed suit, including those in Folsom, California, and Newport News, Virginia, at the beginning of 2015. All of the locations ultimately closed by the end of 2015 citing business failure which resulted in local landlords and developers being taken advantage of, as they either held properties for the restaurants or provided financial advances for space improvements.

Simultaneously, with the support of his girlfriend, Tawny Costa, Gioia brokered a deal with the country music band Rascal Flatts. This partnership resulted in the announcement of the Rascal Flatts Restaurant Group in August 2012. Nevertheless, it was not until August 2016 that concrete plans began to emerge for a physical location. The first Rascal Flatts restaurant opened in the Stamford Town Center Mall in Connecticut. However, it closed in 2018, two years after its launch, citing the same reasons for its failure as the Toby Keith restaurant chain.

== Criminal Activities and lawsuits ==
=== 1900s ===
Since the age of 12, Gioia was involved in various criminal activities such as loan-sharking, bookmaking, stealing cars, and occasionally committing stickups. At the age of 18 he fired a gun to the person who had disrespected a Lucchese man which earned Gioia huge respect from the gangsters and became a "made man" at 24 in 1991.

Gioia testified that while serving as a soldier in the Lucchese crime family, he conspired to commit murders and carried out assaults. He claimed to be involved in arson, extortion, drug trafficking, and arms smuggling. He was given the nicknames "Baby Face" and "Spaghetti Man."

Gioia was operating a heroin trafficking route from Boston to Manhattan when he was apprehended in 1993 on federal drug charges and faced a potential sentence of 30 years to life in prison. While in prison he learned that the mob was planning to assassinate his father. In response, he contacted the FBI and agreed to cooperate with them.

=== 2010 onward ===
After the closure of Toby Keith restaurants in 2015, Frank Gioia faced allegations of fraud and theft. Developers filed lawsuits against him, claiming he had failed to pay contractors, violated lease agreements, and misappropriated millions of dollars that were intended for construction costs. As a result of these legal actions, Gioia accumulated over $65 million in judgments against him in various courts throughout the United States.

In January 2018, the Rascal Flatts Restaurant Group was sued by the owner of a retail space in the Hollywood and Highland complex in Los Angeles, which houses the Dolby Theatre. The lawsuit stated that a lease had been signed for a 7,960 square foot area, and the owner had agreed to provide the Rascal Flatts Restaurant Group with $1 million for construction purposes, including a $102,000 advance that was reportedly not utilized for improvements to the location. It was speculated that the misappropriation of such development funds may have been central to Gioia's fraudulent activities related to the restaurant ventures.

By 2019, it was revealed through an investigation by the Arizona Republic that Gioia was operating both restaurant franchises. The Rascal Flatts Restaurant Group was managed by Philip Lama and Eric Soe, who acted as proxies for Frank Gioia Jr. Following the findings of this investigation, the Rascal Flatts band officially terminated their collaboration with Gioia and prohibited the use of their name in association with his restaurants.

On February 5, 2020, Gioa and his mother Debbie Corvo were indicted on charges of wire fraud and conspiracy to commit money laundering in connection with the operation of various branded restaurant locations in Arizona and across the United States. The indictment charged Gioa with the financial failure of Toby Keith and Rascal Flatts branded restaurants. In 2022, Gioa has received a five-year prison sentence after admitting guilt to charges of conspiracy and tax evasion in a plot that federal officials stated deceived victims, including property developers involved in country music-themed restaurant ventures.
