= Salvatore Avellino =

American mobster

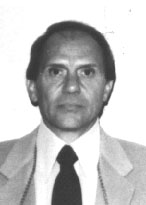
- Salvatore Avellino in a mid-1980s FBI mugshot
- Born: November 19, 1935 (age 91); New York City, U.S.
- Other name: Sally
- Occupation: Mobster
- Allegiance: Lucchese crime family
- Convictions: Murder conspiracy (1994); Racketeering (2001)
- Penalty: 10 years' imprisonment Five years' imprisonment

Salvatore Avellino Jr. (born November 19, 1935), also known as Sally, is an American mobster and former caporegime in the Lucchese crime family who was involved in labor racketeering in the garbage and waste management industry on Long Island, New York. Avellino also served as right-hand man and chauffeur to boss Anthony "Tony Ducks" Corallo.

== Lucchese family capo ==
Avellino was born on November 19, 1935. Over the years, Avellino and his relatives established a stranglehold on the waste hauling business on Long Island. To gather evidence against Avellino, members of the New York State Organized Crime Task Force (OCTF) used undercover informant Robert Kubecka, the owner of a Suffolk County, New York garbage hauling business. Since the 1970s, Kubecka had refused to participate with the mob control of the waste hauling business and had suffered extensive harassment as a result. In 1982, Kubecka agreed to wear a surveillance device during meetings with the mobsters. Although Kubecka was unable to get close to Avellino himself, the information Kubecka gathered eventually persuaded a judge to allow a wire tap on Avellino's home phone in Nissequogue, New York. The home phone tap was also disappointing to the agents; however, it did reveal that Avellino was driving boss Anthony Corallo around all day in Avellino's car.

In 1983, members of the New York State Organized Crime Task Force (OCTF) installed an electronic surveillance device inside the dashboard on Avellino's Jaguar while he and his wife were at a dinner dance. Agents then listened to many conversations between Corallo, Avellino, and other mobsters as they drove around the city. From these recorded conversations, OCTF learned the Commission's internal structure, history, and relations with other crime families. These conversations were shared with federal prosecutors and provided them with invaluable evidence against Corallo and other family bosses in the Mafia Commission Trial.

In 1985, Avellino was promoted to capo.

== Waste hauling industry ==
Salvatore Avellino oversaw operations of Laborers' International Union of North America (LIUNA) Local 66 on Long Island. His younger brother Carmine Avellino and his son Michael Avellino followed him into the waste management rackets. For nearly 15 years, Avellino used aggressive strong-arm tactics to keep Long Island's waste hauling industry under Lucchese family control. Avellino's wife Elaine was the owner, along with other relatives of the SSC Corporation in Holtsville, New York, one of the largest waste haulers in the region. In 1983, Avellino ordered his son Michael and son-in-law Michael Malena to set fire to competitors' garbage trucks.

During one recorded phone call, Avellino explained the Lucchese plans for the waste hauling industry on Long Island to an associate:

We're gonna knock everybody out, absorb everybody, eat them up, or whoever we, whoever stays in there is only who we allowing to stay in there.

Avellino was involved in the infamous Mobro 4000 garbage scow incident of 1987.

On March 10, 1988 Salvatore Avellino Jr. was added to the New Jersey Division of Gaming Enforcement exclusion list.

== Kubecka and Barstow murders ==
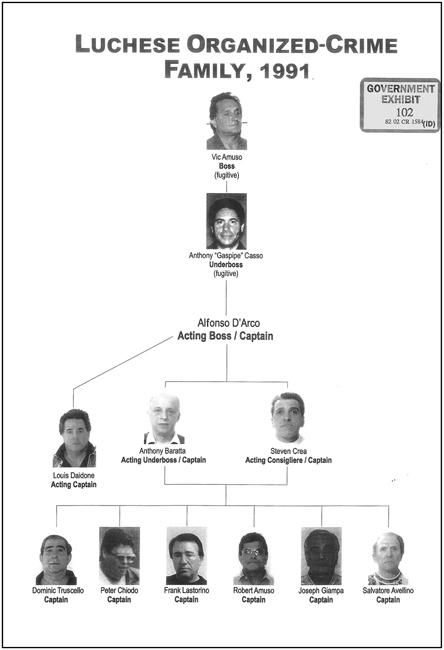
Avellino listed as a capo in a 1991 chart

In 1986, facing evidence from the car recordings, Avellino pleaded guilty to conspiracy charges of using coercion to prevent Robert Kubecka from bidding on waste hauling contracts on Long Island.

In mid 1986, Avellino asked Lucchese underboss Anthony Casso permission to murder Kubecka. Avellino was afraid that Kubecka was going to provide evidence in new criminal and civil cases. Casso agreed to the killing. On August 11, 1989, Lucchese gunmen Rocco Vitulli and Frank "Frankie the Pearl" Federico burst into Kubecka's office in East Northport, New York, where he and his brother-in-law, Donald Barstow, were working. Both Kubecka and Barstow were shot to death.

== Prison ==
On April 13, 1993, Avellino was indicted in federal court on racketeering charges involving the 1989 Kubecka and Barstow murders. Avellino pleaded not guilty to both charges. However, in February 1994, Avellino pleaded guilty to murder conspiracy in the two murders and was sentenced to ten years in federal prison.

On July 16, 1999, Avelino was indicted again in federal courts on 15 counts of racketeering in the waste hauling industry from 1983 to 1998. In March 2001, Avellino pleaded guilty to using threats of violence to run his Long Island waste hauling business from federal prison. As part of a plea deal, Avellino was to serve five more years in prison after the end of his racketeering sentence. On October 13, 2006, Avellino was released from federal prison.
