= Khian Sea waste disposal incident =

1986 waste disposal incident

The Khian Sea waste disposal incident was an incident in maritime waste disposal. The Liberian cargo ship Khian Sea was loaded with 14,000 tons of ash from waste incinerators in Philadelphia, Pennsylvania in August 1986. After searching futilely for a place to dump the waste, the ship eventually dumped 4,000 tons near Gonaïves, Haiti in January 1988, and the other 10,000 tons in the Atlantic and Indian Ocean in November 1988. Since then, there have been attempts to take the waste from Haiti to somewhere else. The case contributed to the creation of the Basel Convention about disposal of hazardous waste.

== Incident ==
=== Loading ===
On August 31, 1986, the cargo ship Khian Sea, registered in Liberia, was loaded with more than 14,000 tons of ash from waste incinerators in Philadelphia, Pennsylvania.

=== First unloading ===
The city had previously sent such waste to New Jersey, but that state refused to accept any more after 1984.

The company handling the waste (Joseph Paolino and Sons) subcontracted shipment to Amalgamated Shipping Corp and Coastal Carrier Inc, operators of Khian Sea. The latter intended to dump the ash in the Bahamas. However, the Bahamian government turned the ship away, and Philadelphia withheld payment to the companies because the waste was not disposed of.

Over the next 16 months, Khian Sea searched all over the Atlantic for a place to dump its cargo. Dominican Republic, Honduras, Panama, Bermuda, Guinea Bissau and the Dutch Antilles refused. Its return to Philadelphia also failed. In January 1988, the crew finally dumped 4,000 tons of the waste near Gonaïves in Haiti as "topsoil fertilizer". When Greenpeace informed the Haitian government of the origin of the waste, the Haitian commerce minister ordered the crew to reload the ash, but the ship slipped away. The Haitian government subsequently banned all waste imports. Local cleanup crews later buried some of the waste in a bunker inland, but the rest remained on the beach.

=== Second unloading ===
Next the crew of Khian Sea tried to unload the rest of the cargo in Senegal, Morocco, Yugoslavia, Sri Lanka and Singapore. After repairs in Yugoslavia, the ship's name changed to Felicia, and registered in Honduras. Later it was renamed Pelicano. These changes failed to hide the ship's original identity.

The rest of the ash disappeared en route from Singapore to Sri Lanka in November 1988. The crew refused to comment but eventually the ship's captain admitted that they had dumped the remaining 10,000 tons of the waste into the Atlantic and Indian Oceans.

== Aftermath ==
In 1993, two owners of Coastal Carrier were convicted of perjury, having ordered the dumping. The ship itself was broken up for scrap in 1992.

Over the years, various attempts to return the ash dumped in Haiti failed.

In 1997, New York City Trade Waste Commission investigated Eastern Environmental Services whose owner was part of Joseph Paolino and Sons. They agreed to give the company a license to operate in New York City in condition that it would contribute to the cleanup in Haiti. Eastern Environmental Services agreed to take the waste back. Greenpeace and Haitian environmental groups launched a "Project Return to Sender" to lobby for funds. City of Philadelphia contributed $50,000.

In April 2000, Waste Management Inc. in Haiti loaded 2,500 tons of ash and contaminated soil onto the barge Santa Lucia and shipped it to Florida, where the barge was docked in the St. Lucie Canal. It remained there until June 2002 when it was moved to Mountain View Reclamation Landfill, in Franklin County, Pennsylvania near Antrim Township, after several government agencies, including the Environmental Protection Agency, had found the contents to be classified as nonhazardous waste.

== See also ==
- Mobro 4000
