= Mobro 4000 =

American barge

The Mobro 4000 was a barge owned by MOBRO Marine, Inc. made infamous in 1987 for hauling the same load of trash along the east coast of North America from New York City to Belize and back until a way was found to dispose of the garbage. During this journey, local press often referred to the Mobro 4000 as the "Gar-barge".

== Voyage ==
In 1987, the City of New York found that it had reached its landfill capacity. The city agreed to ship its garbage to Morehead City, North Carolina, where there were plans to convert it into methane. On 22 March 1987, the tugboat Break of Day towed the barge Mobro 4000 and its cargo of over 3,100 tons (2,812 tonnes) of trash. Chartered by entrepreneur Lowell Harrelson and Long Island mob boss Salvatore Avellino, it set sail on March 22 from Islip, New York, escorted by the tugboat Break of Dawn and carrying 3,168 tons (2,874 tonnes) of trash headed for a pilot program in Morehead City, North Carolina, to be turned into methane.

While it was in transit, a rumor spread that the 16 bundles of trash that contained hospital gowns, syringes and diapers was a contaminant that affected the entire load. The barge was docked at Morehead City, until a WRAL-TV news crew, acting on a tip, flew by helicopter to the coast to investigate. Action News 5 Reporter Susan Brozek broke the story on the 6 p.m. news on 1 April 1987, and North Carolina officials began their own investigation, which resulted in an order for the Mobro to move on.

As a result, the state of North Carolina refused to accept the waste. The barge then proceeded along the coast looking for another place to offload and continued to meet stiff resistance. After an 11-day delay, the Mobro made its way to its home port in Louisiana, but that state, too, declined the waste. Similarly, Alabama, three other states, and the nations of Mexico, Belize, and the Bahamas refused the load. The Mexican Navy denied it entrance to their waters. It made it as far south as Belize, again being rejected, before the operators abandoned the plan and returned to New York.

Lowell Harrelson, the owner of the garbage, tried to negotiate for the Mobro to dock near Queens, whence the refuse would be carried back to Islip by trucks. Claire Shulman, the borough president of Queens, was not consulted, however; she obtained a temporary restraining order that forced the waste to stay at sea. The Mobro and its decaying cargo stayed off the shores of Brooklyn until July, when the vessel was granted a federal anchorage in New Jersey. The court hearings ran until October, when it was agreed that the cargo should be incinerated in Brooklyn. The 430 tons of ash that remained from this process was added to the landfill in Islip.

== Legacy ==
At the time, the Mobro 4000 incident was widely cited by environmentalists and the media as emblematic of the solid-waste disposal crisis in the United States due to a shortage of landfill space: almost 3,000 municipal landfills had closed between 1982 and 1987. It triggered much national public discussion about waste disposal, and may have been a factor in increased recycling rates in the late 1980s and after.

According to the Union of Concerned Scientists, the Mobro 4000 incident was caused by a combination of poor decision making by local Islip public officials and short-term difficulties triggered by changing environmental regulations.

== In popular culture ==
A commemorative T-shirt was produced with the wording "L.I. Garbage Barge - World Tour '87" surrounding a cartoon image of the scow.

The Swedish 1988 comedy film S.O.S. – En segelsällskapsresa features a garbage barge as a plot device, roaming the inner Stockholm Archipelago.

The backstory of the garbage ball in the 1999 Futurama episode "A Big Piece of Garbage", draws directly from this event.

Singer Sally Timms included a song about the incident, "Junk Barge", written by Dave Trumfio, in her 1995 album To the Land of Milk and Honey.

A children's book about the incident, Here Comes the Garbage Barge, by Jonah Winter, was published in 2010. Another, All That Trash: The Story of the 1987 Garbage Barge and Our Problem with Stuff, by Meghan McCarthy, was published in 2018.

== See also ==
- Khian Sea
