= Mastrogiacomo =

Mastrogiacomo is a surname. Notable people with the surname include:

- Antonio Mastrogiacomo (1935–2022), Italian politician
- Daniele Mastrogiacomo (born 1954), Italian-Swiss journalist
- Gina Mastrogiacomo (1961–2001), American actress
