= Karen Hill =

Karen Hill may refer to:

- Karen Friedman Hill (born 1946), wife of American mobster Henry Hill

== See also ==
- Karen Hills, a hill range in eastern Burma
- Hill (surname)
