= American Gangster =

American Gangster may refer to:

- Chael Sonnen (born 1977), a mixed martial artist nicknamed "The American Gangster"
- The American Gangster, a 1992 documentary on early 20th-century American gangsters
- American Gangster (film), a 2007 film by Ridley Scott, starring Russell Crowe and Denzel Washington
- American Gangster (album), a 2007 Jay-Z album inspired by the 2007 film
- American Gangster (TV series), a documentary series on the BET network

== See also ==
- Museum of the American Gangster
