= Theatre 80 =

Former theater in Manhattan, New York

- Interactive map of Theatre 80
- Address: 80 St. Mark's Pl; New York City; United States
- Coordinates: 40°43′39.5″N 73°59′8.8″W

Theatre 80 was an Off-Broadway theater located at 80 St. Mark's Place in the East Village neighborhood of Manhattan, New York City. It was owned and operated by Lorcan Otway, who, along with his father, restored and renovated the building before opening it as a theater in the 1960s. The theater hosted several productions, including the 1967 premiere of You're a Good Man, Charlie Brown. The revenue from this production helped the Otways keep the theater. Seats from the venue were later installed in the main performance space at Lexington House in upstate New York, serving Lexington Conservatory Theatre and Ensemble Studio Theatre programs.

By 1971, Theatre 80 transitioned to cinema. Film programming began with screenings of movie musicals. Howard Otway stated that television airings of these films, with their poor and truncated quality, detracted from the viewing experience. By presenting film musicals, he provided a way for the public to see the movies as they were intended. Otway also became involved in film restoration, collaborating with studios to discover lost movies and seeking to strike new prints from better elements in order to preserve and exhibit titles in a way that showcased their best quality.

Prior to its current status as a cabaret-style theater, the building, which also houses the Museum of the American Gangster, was a nightclub during Prohibition.

The Otways filed for bankruptcy on December 30, 2021, to prevent the sale of the building amid controversy with their mortgage lender. In May 2022, the Otways were told they would have to vacate the theater by August.

Following final efforts to save the theatre, it was reported closed and the Otways were evicted in April 2023. The building was sold at auction for $8.8 million that May.
