= Jacir =

- Directed by: Waheed AlQawasmi
- Written by: Waheed AlQawasmi
- Produced by: Waheed AlQawasmi; Mariana Trevino; Amy Williams
- Starring: Malek Rahbani; Lorraine Bracco; Darius "Tutweezy" Tutwiler
- Edited by: Brian D. Elkins
- Music by: Justin Toland
- Production company: WAFilms
- Distributed by: WAFilms
- Release dates: October 1, 2022 (Nashville Film Festival); March 24, 2023 (USA)
- Running time: 105 minutes
- Country: United States
- Languages: English; Arabic

Jacir (Arabic: جاسر) is a 2022 American drama film written and directed by Waheed AlQawasmi and starring Malek Rahbani, Lorraine Bracco, and Darius "Tutweezy" Tutwiler. It is AlQawasmi's feature directorial debut.

== Cast ==
- Malek Rahbani as Jacir
- Lorraine Bracco as Meryl
- Darius "Tutweezy" Tutwiler as Jerome
- Tony Mehanna as Adam
- Leila Almas Rose as Nadia

== Production ==
In May 2020, it was announced that Bracco was cast in the film and that Sara Abi Kanaan was attached to appear. Production on the film occurred in Memphis, Tennessee in November 2020.

== Release ==
The film premiered at the Nashville Film Festival On October 1, 2022. Then it was released in select theaters on March 24, 2023.

== Reception ==
On the review aggregator website Rotten Tomatoes, 100% of 6 critics' reviews are positive, with an average rating of 7.8/10. Andrew Stover of Film Threat rated the film a 7 out of 10.

== Accolades ==
Accolades received by The Fabelmans
Award	Date of ceremony	Category	Recipient(s)	Result	Ref.
Nashville Film Festival	October 3, 2022	Best Tennessee Feature	Waheed AlQawasmi and Mariana Treviño	Won	
Bend Film Festival	October 9, 2022	Special Jury Award	Malek Rahbani	Won	
Bend Film Festival	October 9, 2022	Best In Show	Waheed AlQawasmi and Mariana Treviño	Nominated	
Bend Film Festival	October 9, 2022	Best Narrative Feature	Waheed AlQawasmi and Mariana Treviño	Nominated	
Bend Film Festival	October 9, 2022	Best Director	Waheed AlQawasmi	Nominated	
Bend Film Festival	October 9, 2022	Best Editing	Brian D. Elkins	Nominated	
East Lansing Film Festival	November 18, 2022	Audience Choice Award for Best Feature	Waheed AlQawasmi	Won	
Lake County Film Festival	November 20, 2022	Audience Choice Award for Best Feature	Waheed AlQawasmi and Mariana Treviño	Won	
Reel East Texas Film Festival	January 12, 2023	Best Narrative Feature	Waheed AlQawasmi and Mariana Treviño	Won	
Reel East Texas Film Festival	January 12, 2023	Best Director	Waheed AlQawasmi	Won	
Reel East Texas Film Festival	January 12, 2023	Best Actress	Lorraine Bracco	Won	
Reel East Texas Film Festival	January 12, 2023	Best Actor	Malek Rahbani	Won	
Reel East Texas Film Festival	January 12, 2023	Best Screenplay	Waheed AlQawasmi	Won	
San Diego Arab Film Festival	March 20, 2023	Audience Choice Award for Best Feature	Waheed AlQawasmi	Won	
