= Chimera (The X-Files) =

- The X-Files episode
- Episode no.: Season 7 Episode 16
- Directed by: Cliff Bole
- Written by: David Amann
- Production code: 7ABX16
- Original air date: April 2, 2000
- Running time: 44 minutes

Guest appearances
- Mitch Pileggi as Walter Skinner; John Mese as Sheriff Phil Adderly; Michelle Joyner as Ellen Adderly; Gina Mastrogiacomo as Jenny Uphouse; F. William Parker as Dr. Blankenship; Wendy Schaal as Martha Crittendon; Charles Hoyes as Howard Crittendon; Ashley Edner as Michelle Crittendon

Episode chronology
← Previous "En Ami"	Next → "all things"
- The X-Files season 7

"Chimera" is the sixteenth episode of the seventh season of the science fiction television series The X-Files. It premiered on the Fox network in the United States, on April 2, 2000, was written by David Amann, and was directed by Cliff Bole. The episode is a "Monster-of-the-Week" story, unconnected to the series' wider mythology. "Chimera" earned a Nielsen household rating of 7.5, being watched by 12.89 million people in its initial broadcast. The episode received mostly positive reviews from critics.

The show centers on FBI special agents Fox Mulder (David Duchovny) and Dana Scully (Gillian Anderson) who work on cases linked to the paranormal, called X-Files. Mulder is a believer in the paranormal, while the skeptical Scully has been assigned to debunk his work. In this episode, Mulder investigates what appears to be the case of a missing woman from a small town, but soon turns out to be a murder by a spirit summoned from the underworld. Scully, meanwhile, must endure an uncomfortable stakeout.

Similar to the sixth season episode, "Arcadia", "Chimera" was written as "a suburban parable about perfection" that examined "the evil that lies beneath a prototypical white-bread suburban existence." The episode was produced at a time when both David Duchovny and Gillian Anderson were directing their own episodes, and in order to compensate, Anderson's role was drastically reduced in the episode.

== Plot ==
In Bethany, Vermont, a young girl, Michelle Crittendon, is frightened by a raven. Later, her mother, Martha, is attacked and killed by a monster. Because her father is a federal judge, FBI Agents Fox Mulder (David Duchovny) and Dana Scully (Gillian Anderson) are assigned to investigate Martha's disappearance. When the agents question Martha's husband, Howard, he reveals that he suspected her of having an affair. Her body is soon discovered buried outside their home, with claw marks on her face.

Ellen Adderly, wife of Sheriff Phil Adderly, later tells Mulder that she saw a monstrous reflection in a mirror and believes it killed Martha. Mulder theorizes that glass may act as a doorway to a demonic dimension and that someone is summoning a demon, whose presence seems to be presaged by the presence of ravens. Ellen suspects their neighbor, Jenny Uphouse. Later, Ellen finds a skeleton key, and Mulder matches the key to one found on Martha. He deduces that Phil had been having affairs with both Martha and Jenny. When questioned by Mulder, Phil admits to the affairs and reveals that Martha was pregnant, likely with his child.

It is revealed that the skeleton key unlocks a motel room, which Phil uses for his trysts. Later, at the motel, Jenny arrives to rendezvous with Phil, but is attacked by the monster. Before she is killed by the creature, she manages to stab the creature. When Mulder notices the wound on Ellen, she transforms into the creature; it turns out she was the one responsible, although she was acting unknowingly. She attempts to drown Mulder but stops when she sees her monstrous reflection in the water. She is later committed to a psychiatric hospital and diagnosed with multiple personality disorder. The episode ends with Ellen smiling knowingly as she sees a raven outside her window.

== Production ==
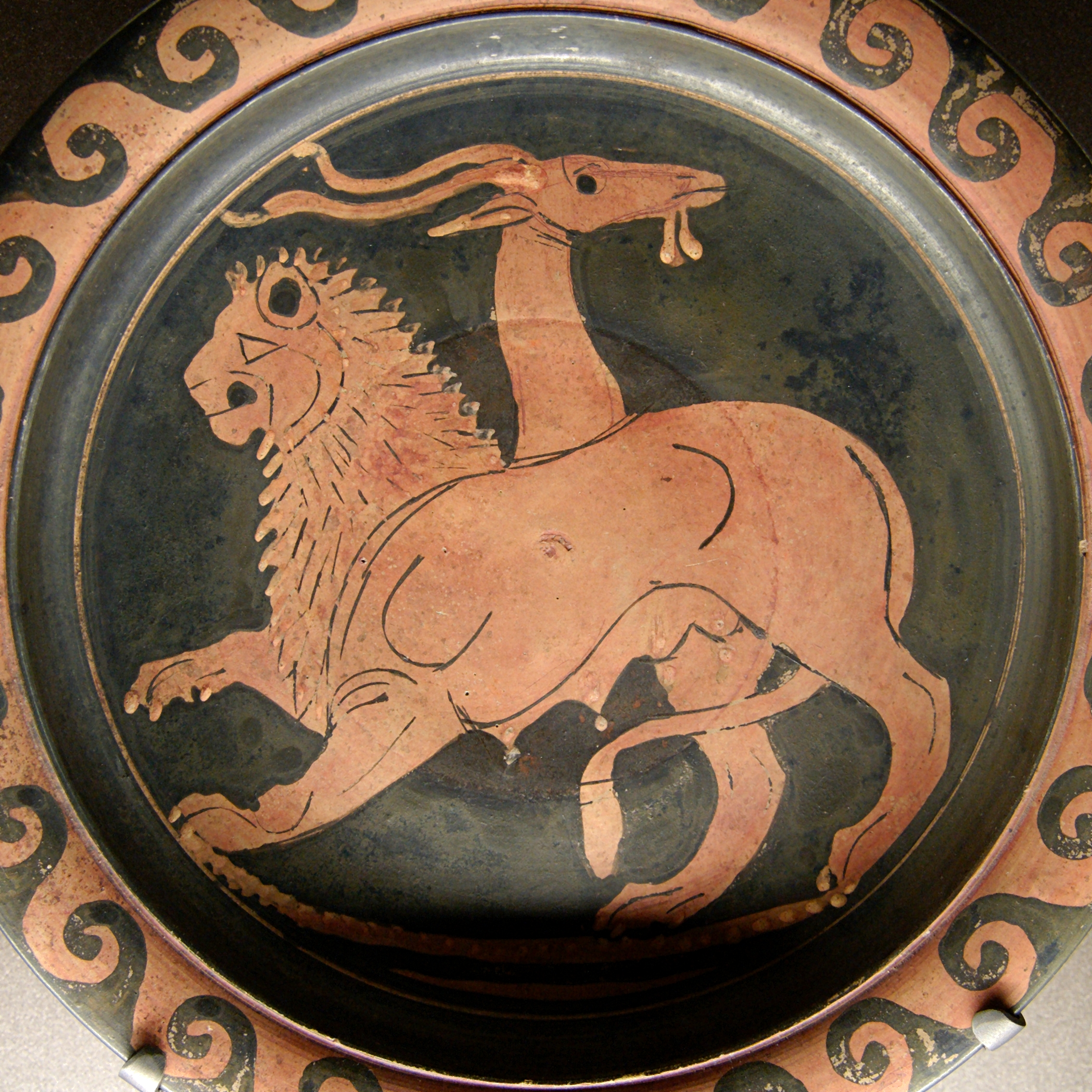
The episode takes its title from the legendary Chimera, which was composed of the body of a lioness, a tail with a snake's head, and torso with the head of a goat.

=== Writing ===
The premise behind "Chimera" was to explore "the evil that [might lie] beneath a prototypical white-bread suburban existence." While these themes had previously been explored in the sixth-season episode, "Arcadia", the show's producers hoped to explore the same ideas in a more "straight-ahead scare" style, rather than supplementing the horror with humor (as was done in "Arcadia"). Series creator Chris Carter, in particular, saw the episode as "a chance to do something bold and new." Carter wanted the story to revolve around a crow, an image that he described simply as "scary". Originally, the episode was going to feature a "subterranean monster" and was aptly going to be titled "Subterranean Monster Blues".

The episode was written in "a burst of twenty-hour days". Greg Walker, who assisted David Amann, called the episode's script "a suburban parable about perfection." Matt Hurwitz and Chris Knowles noted in their book, The Complete X-Files, that "David Amman's script is an insightful commentary on suburban repression and self-delusion, which made a major comeback in the conservative late '90s." While the episode was being written, the production crew dealt with a number of issues, notably the fact that David Duchovny and Gillian Anderson were busy directing their own episodes—"Hollywood A.D." and "all things", respectively. To cope with their limited schedules, the producers planned out the filming of "Chimera" in a way that required Duchovny and Anderson to shoot only a limited number of scenes together. Anderson, in fact, was only needed for one day of filming for her auxiliary subplot involving the prostitute murderer.

=== Casting and filming ===
Rick Millikan, the show's casting director, was tasked with finding "normal-looking suburban people" to play the episode's various characters. Millikan later noted that "the show necessitated casting perfect people. But it's not that easy to find [...] normal-looking people. We've used so many people over the years that it's gotten harder and harder to find them." Several of the individuals cast had had roles in "obscure genre films": Wendy Schaal had appeared in the 1985 film Creature (1985), Gina Mastrogiacomo first was noted for her movie Alien Space Avenger (1989), Michelle Joyner first appeared in the anthology film Grim Prairie Tales (1990), and finally John Mese had a part in the movie Night of the Scarecrow (1995).

Most of the opening scene was shot in an actual Los Angeles backyard. However, because the producers felt that the locale was not suitable for the "tree-lined elements", they supplemented the scenes shot by also filming on the grounds of a nearby museum in Hollywood. The episode ran into several snags during filming. Director Cliff Bole had trouble getting the crows to "act on cue" and so several ravens were brought in as doubles. Bole later noted, "We got two ravens. One was very good at cawing and one was good at hopping." The ending sequence had to be re-shot several times. Producer Paul Rabwin explained, "Originally, we wanted to show a mirror image of the woman being attacked by the monster, but it didn't really sell." Eventually, the crew "glued candy glass onto a piece of plywood, angled the wood, and set the camera on that angle and so [they could film] the attack through the shattered fragments."

== Broadcast and reception ==
"Chimera" first aired in the United States on April 2, 2000. This episode earned a Nielsen rating of 7.5, with an 11 share, meaning that roughly 7.5 percent of all television-equipped households, and 11 percent of households watching television, were tuned in to the episode. It was viewed by 12.89 million viewers. The episode aired in the United Kingdom and Ireland on Sky1 on May 7, 2000, and received 0.56 million viewers, making it the third most watched episode that week.

The episode received mostly positive reviews from critics, with a few detractors. Robert Shearman and Lars Pearson, in their book, Wanting to Believe: A Critical Guide to The X-Files, Millennium & The Lone Gunmen, rated the episode four stars out of five, calling the script "very stylish". The two noted that "[David] Duchovny is very good here […] and, as a counterbalance, [Gillian] Anderson provides some great comic relief." Shearman and Pearson concluded that the episode was "a little too ponderously paced to be a classic episode, but it's clever and well crafted [which makes it] a rewarding stand-out." Rich Rosell from Digitally Obsessed awarded the episode 4 out of 5 stars and wrote that "Cawing birds, spirit portals and split personalities are the order of the day in a story that doesn't offer that much in genuine thrills, but the best moments are Scully's occasional complaints from the field." Paula Vitaris from Cinefantastique gave the episode a moderately positive review and awarded it two-and-a-half stars out of four. Despite noting that the episode "gets off to an awkward start", Vitaris concluded that "'Chimera' takes us into the heart of a quintessential X-Files family". Zack Handlen of The A.V. Club awarded the episode a "B+", noting that, while the episode was good, it "falls short of classic status, trying to make a metaphor into flesh, and not quite succeeding." Although Handlen enjoyed the way the episode explores and then connects the main characters, his main critique was that Ellen's transformation is never explicitly explained. He explained that, "If we had a sense of where her need comes from, if there was some hint at what drove her to this point, it would work; as is, the actress’s performance is excellent, but the character remains too generic."

Not all reviews were positive. Kenneth Silber from Space.com wrote a neutral review, saying, "Beyond that, there is little to be said, pro or con, for 'Chimera.' The episode is mildly interesting and avoids the puerility of recent episodes." Tom Kessenich, in his book Examinations, gave the episode a relatively negative review. He derided the lack of Anderson's character, summing up his feelings in the simple sentence, "No Dana Scully."

== Bibliography ==
- Hurwitz, Matt; Knowles, Chris (2008). The Complete X-Files. Insight Editions. ISBN 978-1-933784-80-9.
- Kessenich, Tom (2002). Examination: An Unauthorized Look at Seasons 6–9 of the X-Files. Trafford Publishing. ISBN 1-55369-812-6.
- Shapiro, Marc (2000). All Things: The Official Guide to the X-Files Volume 6. Harper Prism. ISBN 0-06-107611-2.
