= John Mese =

American actor

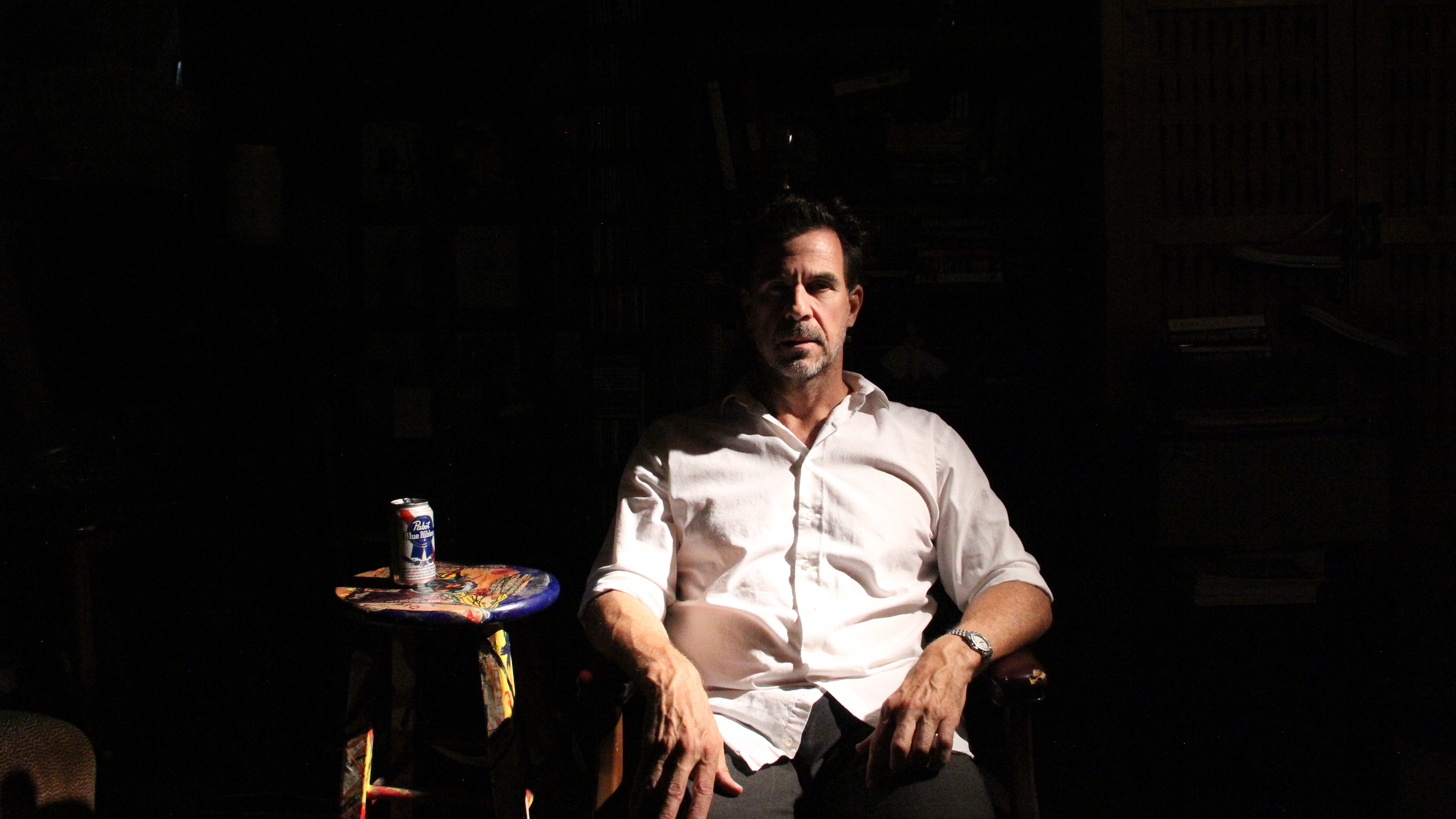
- John Mese in the one-man show Wild Son
- Born: November 4, 1963 (age 63); Baton Rouge, Louisiana, U.S
- Education: Catholic High School; Louisiana State University (MFA, 1989)
- Occupation: Actor
- Years active: 1987–present
- Spouse: Dawn Kelsey (m. 2004)
- Children: 1

John R. Mese (born November 4, 1963) is an American actor, producer, director, and writer. He has had roles in numerous films and television shows. Credited appearances on television include: Rizzoli & Isles, Suits, Castle, The Mentalist, Weeds, Monk, Law & Order, Boomtown, Without a Trace, The X Files, and Sex and the City. Mese is also the writer of a children's book series that was featured in the March 2009 issue of Kiplinger's Personal Finance magazine.

== Early life and education ==
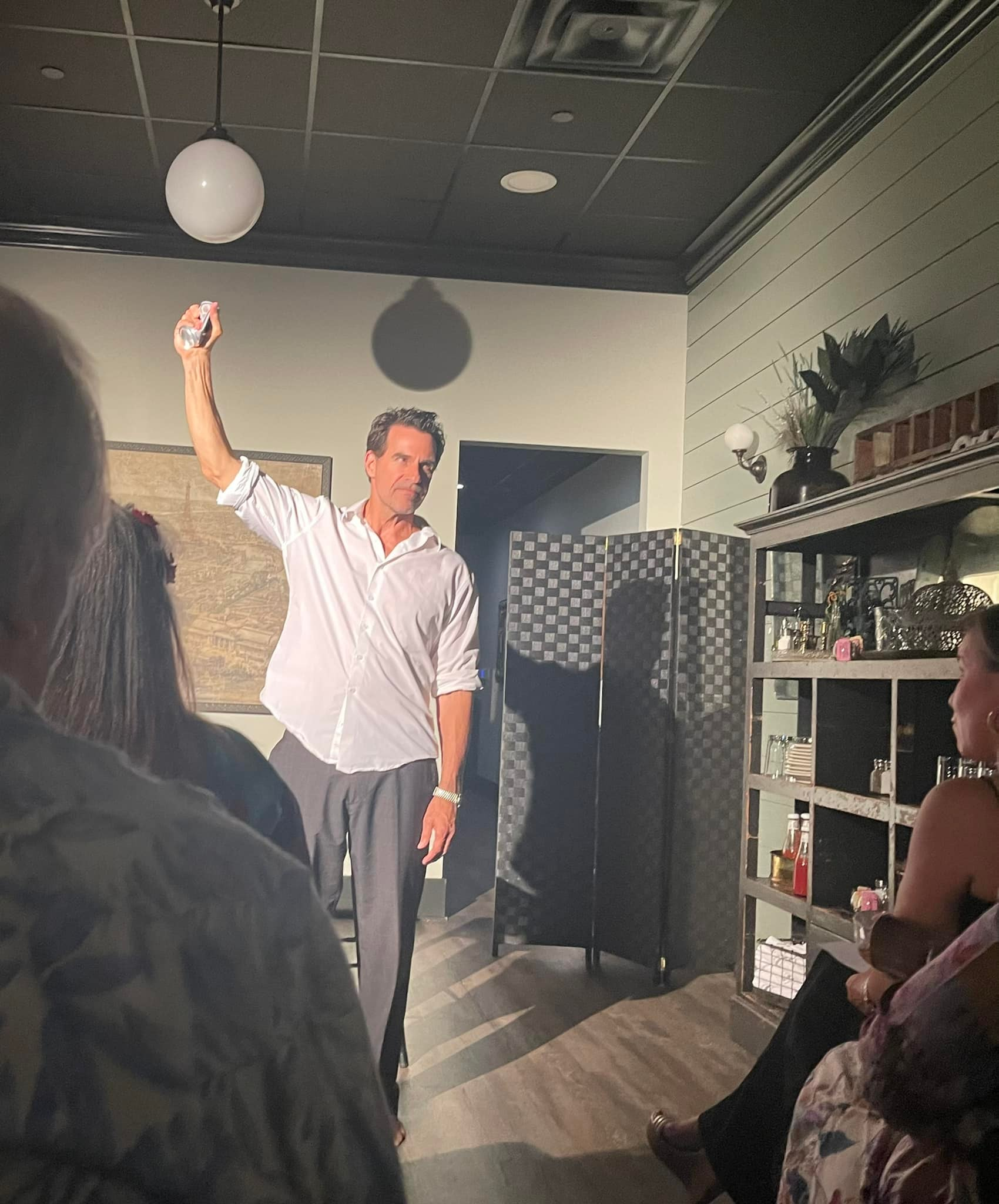
Actor John Mese in character as Christian Brando at Bistro Byronz, Baton Rouge, LA

John Mese is the son of John Daniel (a dentist) and Kay Mese of Baton Rouge, Louisiana, where he was born and raised along with three brothers and a sister. He finished his secondary education at Catholic High School and went on to earn a bachelor's degree in advertising and a Master of Fine Arts (MFA) in Theatre from Louisiana State University. At LSU, he was a member of the Sigma Chi fraternity and performed in a number of LSU Theatre productions. In 1986, he was a finalist in the "Face of the '80s" contest organized by Ford Models and GQ Magazine.

== Career ==
=== Theatre ===
At LSU, he acted in several theater productions, to name a few: The Tooth of Crime in 1986, in which he played Hoss; Sly Fox in 1982, and Death of a Salesman in 1986. He played "Treat" in Lyle Kessler's play Orphans. He played Alvaro Mangiacavallo in the LSU Theatre main stage production of The Rose Tattoo, directed by John Dennis in 1987.

He had the title role in an acclaimed one-man show written by Champ Clark, Wild Son: The Testimony of Christian Brando, which premiered at the Santa Monica Playhouse in 2019 and was praised by Pulitzer Prize-winning playwright Beth Henley. Wild Son is based on face-to-face interviews between the journalist Champ Clark and Christian Brando before the latter's death in 2008. The show was performed at Bistro Byronz, a restaurant chain in Baton Rouge, Louisiana, on June 19, 2022. The show ran at the Edinburgh Festival Fringe from August 15-20, 2022. Both the show and Mese's performance as Brando were singled out by Chaz Ebert as "riveting."

Mese wrote his own one-man show titled, The Story of Me and My Dad. Mese initially planned to perform the show in Los Angeles in June 2025, but a major stroke forced him to postpone it, as he had a six-month rehabilitation. The first performance was at the UnUrban Coffee House in Santa Monica. In February 2026, it was performed at the Whitefire Theatre in Sherman Oaks. In November 2026, Mese brought the show to Louisiana for a filmed performance at the Manship Theatre in Baton Rouge.

=== Film ===
Mese had the starring role as Richard Broderick in the film Noise in the Middle (2020), also starring Tara Buck as Richard’s deceased wife. He played Augie in King of Herrings (2013), an indie film directed by Eddie Jemison and also starring Mese's fellow LSU alumnus Joe Chrest. Mese played "Crow" in Derek Sitter's award-winning short, Bugtussle (2022). Bugtussle was recognized by the Accolade Global Film Competition for "Awards of Merit" in August 2022, notably for Leading Actor (Mese), Supporting Actor (Sitter), Film Short, Script/Writer (Sitter), Original Score, composed by James Hutchens and Johnny Bourbon.

Year	Title	Role	Notes
1998	Dangerous Proposition	Darby	Dir. Brad Sanders
2005	Pizza My Heart	Jean Paul Veber	Dir. Andy Wolk
2005	Gone But Not Forgotten	Randy Highsmith	Dir. Armand Mastroianni
2005	Jane Doe: Vanishing Act	Lloyd McMasters	Dir. James Contner
2007	Perfect Day	Executive Producer/Writer	Dir. John Mese
2008	Pillow Talk	Executive Producer/Writer	Dir. John Mese
2013	King of Herrings	Augie + Producer	Dir. Eddie Jemison & Sean Richardson
2020	Noise in the Middle	Richard Broderick	Dir. Marcus McCollum
2022	Bugtussle	Crow	Dir. Derek Sitter

=== Television ===
Mese was featured alongside Mark Harmon and Frederic Lehne in a Lili Fini Zanuck-directed production called "We Have Cleared the Tower," in which Mese played the role of Donn Eisele of the Apollo 7 mission; Harmon played Wally Schirra, and Lehne played Walt Cunningham. Mese was a cast member for Episode 1 ("Can We Do This?") and Episode 3 ("We Have Cleared The Tower") of From the Earth to the Moon (1998). His "first big job" for television was in 1992 as the love interest of Marlee Matlin on Reasonable Doubts. Prior to that, his TV roles (on shows like The Fanelli Boys, Matlock, and Northern Exposure) were relatively minor. He was "the Congo Man" in a Budweiser Beer commercial narrated by Sarah Jessica Parker (in character as Carrie Bradshaw). In 2000, Mese played Sheriff Phil Adderly on Chimera (The X-Files), one of the "Monster of the Week" episodes in the seventh season of The X Files. He played the baseball coach, in season 2 episode 10 of Ghost Whisperer.

=== Writing ===
Mese and his wife, Dawn Kelsey, are the authors of a children's book series called Flippy and Friends. The idea started in 2002; Mese and Kelsey worked with illustrator Chanler Holden and her husband, Major Mittendorf.

In 2017, Mese penned an editorial for the entertainment section of Purple Clover; this was an autobiographical sketch about boyhood fantasy, titled "My First Playboy."

== Awards ==
- Best Acting Performance for "Crow" in Bugtussle (Short 2022), Oregon Short Film Festival, Winter 2023 edition
