= Goodfellas =

1990 film by Martin Scorsese

- Theatrical release poster
- Directed by: Martin Scorsese
- Screenplay by: Nicholas Pileggi; Martin Scorsese
- Based on: Wiseguy by Nicholas Pileggi
- Produced by: Irwin Winkler
- Starring: Robert De Niro; Ray Liotta; Joe Pesci; Lorraine Bracco; Paul Sorvino
- Cinematography: Michael Ballhaus
- Edited by: Thelma Schoonmaker
- Production companies: Warner Bros.; Irwin Winkler Productions
- Distributed by: Warner Bros.
- Release dates: September 9, 1990 (Venice); September 18, 1990 (United States)
- Running time: 146 minutes
- Country: United States
- Language: English
- Budget: $25 million
- Box office: $47.1 million

Goodfellas (stylized as GoodFellas) is a 1990 American gangster film directed by Martin Scorsese, written by Nicholas Pileggi and Scorsese, and produced by Irwin Winkler. It is a film adaptation of Pileggi's 1985 nonfiction book Wiseguy. Starring Robert De Niro, Ray Liotta, Joe Pesci, Lorraine Bracco and Paul Sorvino, the film narrates the rise and fall of Mafia associate Henry Hill and his friends and family from 1955 to 1980.

Scorsese initially titled the film Wise Guy and postponed making it; he and Pileggi later changed the title to Goodfellas. To prepare for their roles in the film, De Niro, Pesci and Liotta often spoke with Pileggi, who shared research material remaining from writing the book. According to Pesci, improvisation and ad-libbing came from rehearsals wherein Scorsese gave the actors freedom to do whatever they wanted. The director made transcripts of these sessions, took the lines that he liked most, and put them into a revised script, from which the cast worked during principal photography.

Goodfellas premiered at the 47th Venice International Film Festival on September 9, 1990, where Scorsese was awarded with the Silver Lion award for Best Director, and was released in the United States on September 18 by Warner Bros.. When released, the film grossed $47 million against a budget of $25 million and received widespread acclaim. The film was nominated for six Academy Awards, including Best Picture and Best Director, with Pesci winning Best Supporting Actor. The film also won five BAFTAs, including Best Film and Best Director, and was named the year's best film by various critics' groups.

Widely regarded as one of the greatest films ever made, particularly in the gangster genre, the critical consensus on review aggregator Rotten Tomatoes calls it "arguably the high point of Martin Scorsese's career". In 2000, it was deemed "culturally, historically, or aesthetically significant" and selected for preservation in the National Film Registry by the United States Library of Congress. Its content and style have been emulated in numerous other media.

== Plot ==
In 1955, teenager Henry Hill becomes enamored of the criminal life and Mafia presence in East New York, a working class Italian American neighborhood in Brooklyn, New York City. He begins working for local caporegime Paulie Cicero and his associates Jimmy Conway, an Irish American truck hijacker and gangster, and Tommy DeVito, a fellow juvenile delinquent predisposed to violence. Henry begins as a fence for Jimmy, gradually working his way up to more serious crimes.

In 1965, Henry starts dating Karen Friedman, a Jewish American woman who is initially confused by Henry's criminal activities. She is soon seduced by Henry's glamorous lifestyle and marries him despite the disapproval of her parents. Henry, Tommy, and Jimmy manage to excel in carjacking and stealing cargo trucks from JFK Airport, and eventually, they commit the Air France robbery in 1967.

On June 11, 1970, Billy Batts, a made man in the Gambino crime family who was recently released from prison, incessantly insults Tommy at a nightclub owned by Henry. In response, Tommy and Jimmy brutally beat him to his apparent death. Realizing that the unsanctioned murder of a made man will invite retribution, Jimmy, Henry and Tommy bury the body in Upstate New York, stabbing and fatally shooting him when he is discovered to be alive. Six months later, Jimmy learns that the burial site is slated for development, prompting them to exhume and relocate the decaying corpse.

In 1974, Karen harasses Henry's mistress Janice and threatens Henry at gunpoint. Henry moves in with Janice, but Paulie insists that he return to Karen after collecting a debt from a gambler in Tampa with Jimmy. Jimmy and Henry are arrested after being turned in by the gambler's sister, an FBI typist, and they receive ten-year prison sentences. To support his family on the outside, Henry has Karen smuggle in drugs from Pittsburgh, which he sells to fellow inmates.

In 1978, Henry is paroled and expands his cocaine business with Jimmy and Tommy against Paulie's orders. Jimmy organizes a crew to raid the Lufthansa vault at JFK Airport, stealing six million dollars in cash and jewelry. After some members purchase expensive items against Jimmy's orders and the getaway truck is found by police, he has most of the crew killed. Only Henry and Tommy are spared, as Henry is making him money through his Pittsburgh connection and Tommy is about to become a made man. However, Tommy is killed when he arrives at the bogus initiation ceremony in 1979 in retribution for murdering Batts, much to Jimmy's dismay and anger.

By 1980, Henry has become a nervous wreck due to heavy cocaine use. He sets up another drug deal with his Pittsburgh associates but is arrested by narcotics agents and incarcerated. After bailing him out, Karen explains that she flushed $60,000 worth of cocaine down the toilet to prevent FBI agents from finding it during their raid, leaving the Hills penniless.

Feeling betrayed by Henry's drug dealing and realizing that he is a liability, Paulie gives him $3,200 out of pity and ends their association - which revokes Henry's protection from Jimmy, and makes him fair game. Henry meets Jimmy at a diner and is asked to travel to a hit assignment, but the request makes him suspicious.

Henry concludes that Jimmy plans to have him killed and decides to finally become an informant and enroll with his family in the witness protection program. Henry gives sufficient testimony and evidence in court to have Paulie and Jimmy convicted, and moves to a neighborhood in an undisclosed location, in accordance with the witness protection program. Henry describes his unhappiness by leaving his exciting and turbulent gangster life, feeling condemned to live a boring, average life as a "schnook".

== Cast ==
- Robert De Niro as James "Jimmy" Conway
- Ray Liotta as Henry Hill
  - Christopher Serrone as Young Henry
- Joe Pesci as Tommy DeVito
  - Joseph D'Onofrio as Young Tommy
- Lorraine Bracco as Karen Hill
- Paul Sorvino as Paulie Cicero
- Frank Sivero as Frankie Carbone
- Tony Darrow as Sonny Bunz
- Mike Starr as Frenchy
- Frank Vincent as Billy Batts
- Chuck Low as Morris Kessler
- Frank DiLeo as Tuddy Cicero
- Henny Youngman as himself
- Gina Mastrogiacomo as Janice Rossi
- Catherine Scorsese as Tommy's mother
- Charles Scorsese as Vinnie
- Suzanne Shepherd as Karen's mother
- Debi Mazar as Sandy
- Margo Winkler as Belle Kessler
- Welker White as Lois Byrd
- Jerry Vale as himself
- Julie Garfield as Mickey Conway
- Elaine Kagan as Henry's mother
- Beau Starr as Henry's father
- Kevin Corrigan as Michael "Mike" Hill
- Michael Imperioli as Spider
- Robbie Vinton as Bobby Vinton
- John Williams as Johnny Roastbeef
- Illeana Douglas as Rosie
- Frank Pellegrino as Johnny Dio
- Tony Sirico as Tony Stacks
- Samuel L. Jackson as Stacks Edwards
- Paul Herman as Dealer
- Edward McDonald as himself
- Louis Eppolito as Fat Andy
- Tony Lip as Frankie the Wop
- Anthony Powers as Jimmy Two Times
- Vinny Pastore as Man w/Coatrack
- Tobin Bell as Parole Officer
- Isiah Whitlock Jr. as Doctor
- Richard "Bo" Dietl as Arresting Narc
- Ed Deacy as Detective Deacy
- Victor Colicchio as Henry's '60s crew
- Vincent Gallo as Henry's '70s crew
- Joseph Bono as Mikey Franzese
- Katherine Wallach as Diane
- Bob Golub as Truck Driver at Diner

== Production ==
=== Development ===
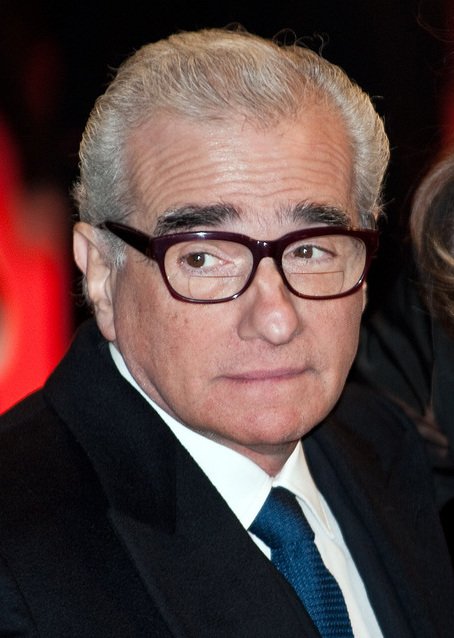
Martin Scorsese, the director of the film, in 2010

Goodfellas is based on New York crime reporter Nicholas Pileggi's book Wiseguy. Martin Scorsese did not intend to make another Mafia film, but he saw a review of Pileggi's book, which he read while working on The Color of Money in 1986. He had always been fascinated by the mob lifestyle, and was drawn to Pileggi's book because he thought that it was the most honest portrayal of gangsters that he had ever read.

After reading the book, Scorsese knew what approach he wanted to take: "To begin Goodfellas like a gunshot and have it get faster from there, almost like a two-and-a-half-hour trailer. I think it's the only way you can really sense the exhilaration of the lifestyle, and to get a sense of why a lot of people are attracted to it." According to Pileggi, Scorsese cold-called the writer and told him, "I've been waiting for this book my entire life," to which Pileggi replied, "I've been waiting for this phone call my entire life."

Scorsese decided to postpone making the film when funds materialized in 1988 to make The Last Temptation of Christ. He was drawn to the documentary aspects of Pileggi's book. "The [Wiseguy] book gives you a sense of the day-to-day life, the tedium, how they work, how they take over certain nightclubs, and for what reasons. It shows how it's done." He saw Goodfellas as the third film in an unplanned trilogy of films that examined the lives of Italian-Americans "from slightly different angles". He has often described the film as "a mob home movie" that is about money, because "that's what they're really in business for". Two weeks in advance of the filming, the real Henry Hill was paid $480,000.

=== Screenplay ===
Scorsese and Pileggi collaborated on the screenplay, and during the course of the 12 drafts that it took to reach the ideal script, the reporter realized that "the visual styling had to be completely redone... So we decided to share credit." They chose the sections of the book that they liked and assembled them like building blocks. Scorsese persuaded Pileggi that they did not need to follow a traditional narrative structure.

Scorsese wanted to take the gangster film and deal with it episode by episode, but start in the middle and move backward and forward. Scorsese compacted scenes, realizing that if they were kept short, "the impact after about an hour and a half would be terrific." He wanted to use narration in a manner reminiscent of François Truffaut's 1962 film Jules and Jim, and use "all the basic tricks of the New Wave from around 1961." This is the first time since Mean Streets that Scorsese is credited as a co-writer.

The names of several real-life gangsters are altered for the film: Tommy "Two Gun" DeSimone became Tommy DeVito, taking the name from Pesci's friend and employee, the former 4 Seasons guitarist of the same name, Tommy DeVito. (The role was otherwise unrelated to the musician.) Paul Vario became Paulie Cicero, and Jimmy "The Gent" Burke became Jimmy Conway, after Burke's birth surname. Scorsese initially titled the film Wise Guy, but he and Pileggi decided to change the title of their film to Goodfellas because two contemporary projects, the 1986 Brian De Palma film Wise Guys and the 1987–1990 TV series Wiseguy, had used similar titles.

=== Casting ===
Once Robert De Niro agreed to play Jimmy Conway, Scorsese was able to secure the money needed to make the film. Ray Liotta, who played Henry Hill, had read Pileggi's book when it came out and was fascinated by it. A couple of years afterward, his agent told him that Scorsese was going to direct a film adaptation. In 1988, Liotta met with Scorsese over a period of a couple of months and auditioned for the film. He campaigned aggressively for a role, although Warner Bros. wanted a well-known actor; he later said, "I think they would've rather had Eddie Murphy than me".

Scorsese cast Liotta after De Niro saw him in Jonathan Demme's Something Wild (1986); Scorsese was surprised by "his explosive energy" in that film. John Malkovich was considered for the role of Conway, and William Petersen, Sean Penn, Alec Baldwin, Aidan Quinn, Val Kilmer and Tom Cruise were considered for the role of Hill.

To prepare for the role, De Niro consulted with Pileggi, who had research material that had been discarded while writing the book. De Niro often called Hill several times a day to ask how Burke walked, held his cigarette, and so on. Driving to and from the set, Liotta listened to FBI audio cassette tapes of Hill, so that he could practice speaking like his real-life counterpart.

Madonna was considered for the role of Karen Hill. To research her role, Lorraine Bracco tried to get close to a mob wife but was unable due to the insular nature of Mafia communities. She decided not to meet the real Karen, saying that she "thought it would be better if the creation came from me". Paul Sorvino had no problem finding the voice and walk of his character, but found it challenging to find what he called "that kernel of coldness and absolute hardness that is antithetical to my nature except when my family is threatened".

Former EDNY prosecutor Edward A. McDonald appeared in the film as himself, re-creating the conversation that he had with Henry and Karen Hill about joining the Witness Protection Program. McDonald, who was friends with Pileggi, was cast on a whim; while a location scout was taking pictures of his office, McDonald casually remarked that he would be happy to play himself if needed. Pileggi called him an hour later asking if he was serious, and he was cast. The scene was unscripted, with McDonald improvising the line referring to Karen as a "babe-in-the-woods".

=== Photography ===
The film was shot on location in Queens, Upstate New York, New Jersey and parts of Long Island during spring and summer 1989, with a budget of $25 million. According to Scorsese, shooting wrapped up on August 14. Scorsese broke the film into sequences and storyboarded everything because of the complicated style throughout. The filmmaker stated, "[I] wanted lots of movement and I wanted it to be throughout the whole picture, and I wanted the style to kind of break down by the end, so that by [Henry's] last day as a wise guy, it's as if the whole picture would be out of control, give the impression he's just going to spin off the edge and fly out."

He added that the film's style came from the opening scenes of Jules and Jim: extensive narration, quick edits, freeze frames and multiple locale switches. It is this reckless attitude toward convention that mirrors the attitude of many of the gangsters in the film. Scorsese remarked, "So if you do the movie, you say, 'I don't care if there's too much narration. Too many quick cuts?—That's too bad.' It's that kind of really punk attitude we're trying to show." He adopted a frenetic style to almost overwhelm the audience with images and information. He also put plenty of detail in every frame because he believed that the gangster life is so rich. Freeze frames were used for certain scenes because Scorsese wanted to highlight that "a point was being reached" in Henry's life.

Joe Pesci did not judge his character, but found that scene in which he kills Spider hard to do until he forced himself to feel the way Tommy did. Bracco found the shoot to be an emotionally difficult one because of the male-dominated cast, and realized that if she did not make her "work important, it would probably end up on the cutting room floor". When it came to the relationship between Henry and Karen, Bracco saw no difference between an abused wife and her character.

According to Pesci, improvisation and ad-libbing came out of rehearsals wherein Scorsese let the actors do whatever they wanted. He made transcripts of these sessions, took the lines that the actors came up with that he liked best, and put them into a revised script from which the cast worked during principal photography. For example, the scene in which Tommy tells a story and Henry is responding to him—the "Funny how? Do I amuse you?" scene—is based on an actual event that Pesci experienced. Pesci was working as a waiter when he thought that he was making a compliment to a mobster by saying he was "funny"; however, the comment was not taken well. It was worked on in rehearsals at which he and Liotta improvised, and Scorsese recorded four to five takes, rewrote their dialogue and inserted it into the script.

The dinner scene with Tommy's mother (portrayed by Scorsese's mother Catherine) was also improvised, with the only scripted line being "Did Tommy tell you about my painting?". Tommy's mother's painting of the bearded man with the dogs was painted by Nicholas Pileggi's mother and based on a photograph from the November 1978 edition of National Geographic magazine. The cast did not meet Henry Hill until a few weeks before the film's premiere. Liotta met him in an undisclosed city; Hill had seen the film and told the actor that he loved it.

The long tracking shot through the Copacabana nightclub came about because of a practical problem: the filmmakers could not get permission to go in the short way, and this forced them to go round the back. Scorsese decided to film the sequence in one unbroken shot to symbolize that Henry's entire life was ahead of him, commenting, "It's his seduction of her [Karen] and it's also the lifestyle seducing him". This sequence was shot eight times because Henny Youngman messed up his lines.

Henry's last day as a criminal was the hardest part of the film for Scorsese to shoot because he wanted to properly show Henry's state of anxiety and paranoia caused by cocaine and amphetamine use. In an interview with film critic Mark Cousins, Scorsese explained the reason for Pesci shooting at the camera at the end of the film: "Well that's a reference right to the end of The Great Train Robbery...and basically the plot of this picture is very similar to The Great Train Robbery. It hasn't changed, 90 years later, it's the same story, the gun shots will always be there, he's always going to look behind his back, he's gotta have eyes behind his back, because they're gonna get him someday." The director ended the film with Henry regretting that he is no longer a wise guy, about which Scorsese said that "I think the audience should get angry at him and I would hope they do—and maybe with the system which allows this".

=== Post-production ===
Scorsese wanted to depict the film's violence realistically, "cold, unfeeling and horrible. Almost incidental". However, he had to remove 10 frames of blood to ensure an R rating from the MPAA. Goodfellas was Scorsese's most expensive film to that point, but still a medium-sized budget by Hollywood standards.

It is also the first time that he was obliged by Warner Bros. to preview the film. At two preview screenings in California, audiences were "agitated" by the sequence depicting Henry's final day as a gangster, which Scorsese argued was his and editor Thelma Schoonmaker's intention. In the first test screening, forty audience members walked out in the first ten minutes. One of the favorite scenes for test audiences was the "Funny like a clown? Do I amuse you?" scene.

=== Soundtrack ===
Although there is no incidental score in the film, Scorsese chose songs for the soundtrack that he felt obliquely commented on the scene or the characters. In any given scene, he used only music contemporary to or older than the scene's setting. According to Scorsese, many of the non-dialogue scenes were shot to playback. For example, he had "Layla" by Derek and the Dominos playing on the set while shooting the scene in which the dead bodies are discovered in the car, dumpster and meat truck. Sometimes, the lyrics of songs were inserted between lines of dialogue to comment on the action. Some of the music Scorsese had written into the script, while other songs he discovered during the editing phase.

== Release ==
=== Theatrical ===
Goodfellas premiered at the 47th Venice International Film Festival, where Scorsese received the Silver Lion award for best director. It was given a wide release in North America on September 21, 1990.

=== Home media ===
Goodfellas was released on DVD in March 1997, in a single-disc, double-sided, single-layer format that requires the disc to be flipped during viewing. In 2004, Warner Home Video released a two-disc, dual-layer version, with remastered picture and sound, and bonus materials such as commentary tracks.

In early 2007, the film became available on single Blu-ray with all the features from the 2004 release; an expanded Blu-ray version was released on February 16, 2010, for its 20th anniversary, bundled with a disc with features that include the 2008 documentary Public Enemies: The Golden Age of the Gangster Film. On May 5, 2015, a 25th anniversary edition was released. The film was released on 4K Ultra HD Blu-ray on December 6, 2016. The 25th anniversary release and subsequent releases include a Merrie Melodies and Looney Tunes collection with the shorts I Like Mountain Music (1933), She Was an Acrobat's Daughter (1937), Racketeer Rabbit (1946) and Bugs and Thugs (1954).

== Reception ==
=== Box office ===
Goodfellas grossed $6.3 million from 1,070 theaters in its opening weekend, topping the box office. In its second weekend, the film made $5.9 million from 1,291 theaters, falling just 8% and finishing second behind newcomer Pacific Heights. It went on to make $46.8 million domestically.

=== Critical response ===
According to review aggregator Rotten Tomatoes, 93% of 168 critics have given the film a positive review with an average rating of 9.2/10. The website's critics consensus reads: "Hard-hitting and stylish, GoodFellas is a gangster classic—and arguably the high point of Martin Scorsese's career." Metacritic has assigned the film a weighted average score of 92 out of 100, based on reviews from 21 critics, indicating "universal acclaim". Audiences polled by CinemaScore gave the film an average grade of A− on a scale of A+ to F.

In his review for the Chicago Sun-Times, Roger Ebert gave the film a full four stars and wrote, "No finer film has ever been made about organized crime – not even The Godfather."

In his review for the Chicago Tribune, Gene Siskel wrote, "All of the performances are first-rate; Pesci stands out, though, with his seemingly unscripted manner. GoodFellas is easily one of the year's best films." Both critics named it the best film of 1990. In his review for The New York Times, Vincent Canby wrote, "More than any earlier Scorsese film, Goodfellas is memorable for the ensemble nature of the performances... The movie has been beautifully cast from the leading roles to the bits. There is flash also in some of Mr. Scorsese's directorial choices, including freeze frames, fast cutting and the occasional long tracking shot. None of it is superfluous."

USA Today gave the film four stars out of four, and called it, "great cinema—and also a whopping good time".

David Ansen, in his review for Newsweek magazine, wrote, "Every crisp minute of this long, teeming movie vibrates with outlaw energy."

Rex Reed said, "Big, rich, powerful and explosive. One of Scorsese's best films! Goodfellas is great entertainment."

In his review for Time, Richard Corliss wrote, "So it is Scorsese's triumph that GoodFellas offers the fastest, sharpest 2½-hr. ride in recent film history."

In a more negative review, Pauline Kael of The New Yorker wrote, "Is it a great movie? I don’t think so." and that "what flattens the movie isn’t that [its central characters are] shallow sociopaths; it’s that these sociopaths are conceived shallowly, the way they used to be in B pictures."

=== Lists ===
The film is ranked the best of 1990 by Roger Ebert, Gene Siskel and Peter Travers. In a poll of 80 film critics, Goodfellas was named the best film of the year by 34 critics. Director Martin Scorsese was chosen as the year's best director in 45 of the 80 ballots.

Goodfellas is ranked No. 92 on the AFI's 100 Years...100 Movies (10th Anniversary Edition) list, published in 2007. In 2012, the Motion Picture Editors Guild listed Goodfellas as the fifteenth best-edited film of all time based on a survey of its membership. In the 2012 Sight & Sound polls, it was ranked the 48th-greatest film ever made in the directors' poll. In the subsequent 2022 polls, it was ranked 28th in the directors' poll and tied for 63rd (with Casablanca and The Third Man) in the critics' poll.

Goodfellas is 39th on James Berardinelli's 2014-made list of the top 100 films of all time. In 2014, WhatCulture included Joe Pesci's role in top "10 Most Convincing Movie Psychopath Performances". In 2015, Goodfellas ranked 20th on BBC's "100 Greatest American Films" list, voted on by film critics from around the world. The February 2020 issue of New York Magazine lists Goodfellas as among "The Best Movies That Lost Best Picture at the Oscars."

== Accolades ==
Goodfellas is one of eight films to have won Best Picture from three out of the four major U.S. film critics' groups (LA, NY, and NSFC, in its case), along with Nashville, All the President's Men, Terms of Endearment, Pulp Fiction, The Hurt Locker, Drive My Car, and Tár.

Award	Category	Nominee	Result
Academy Award	Best Picture	Irwin Winkler	Nominated
Academy Award	Best Director	Martin Scorsese	Nominated
Academy Award	Best Supporting Actor	Joe Pesci	Won
Academy Award	Best Supporting Actress	Lorraine Bracco	Nominated
Academy Award	Best Adapted Screenplay	Martin Scorsese and Nicholas Pileggi	Nominated
Academy Award	Best Film Editing	Thelma Schoonmaker	Nominated
Golden Globe Award	Best Motion Picture – Drama	Martin Scorsese and Irwin Winkler	Nominated
Golden Globe Award	Best Director	Martin Scorsese	Nominated
Golden Globe Award	Best Supporting Actor	Joe Pesci	Nominated
Golden Globe Award	Best Supporting Actress	Lorraine Bracco	Nominated
Golden Globe Award	Best Screenplay	Martin Scorsese and Nicholas Pileggi	Nominated
British Academy Film Award	Best Film	Martin Scorsese and Irwin Winkler	Won
British Academy Film Award	Best Director	Martin Scorsese	Won
British Academy Film Award	Best Adapted Screenplay	Martin Scorsese and Nicholas Pileggi	Won
British Academy Film Award	Best Actor	Robert De Niro	Nominated
British Academy Film Award	Best Editing	Thelma Schoonmaker	Won
British Academy Film Award	Best Cinematography	Michael Ballhaus	Nominated
British Academy Film Award	Best Costume Design	Richard Bruno	Won
Directors Guild of America Award	Outstanding Directing – Feature	Martin Scorsese	Nominated
Writers Guild of America Award	Best Adapted Screenplay	Martin Scorsese and Nicholas Pileggi	Nominated
César Award	Best Non-French Film	Martin Scorsese and Irwin Winkler	Nominated
Venice Film Festival	Golden Lion	Goodfellas	Nominated
Venice Film Festival	Silver Lion for Best Director	Martin Scorsese	Won
Venice Film Festival	Audience Award	Martin Scorsese	Won
Venice Film Festival	Filmcritica "Bastone Bianco" Award	Martin Scorsese	Won
New York Film Critics Circle Award	Best Film	Martin Scorsese and Irwin Winkler	Won
New York Film Critics Circle Award	Best Director	Martin Scorsese	Won
New York Film Critics Circle Award	Best Actor	Robert De Niro	Won
Los Angeles Film Critics Association Award	Best Film	Martin Scorsese and Irwin Winkler	Won
Los Angeles Film Critics Association Award	Best Director	Martin Scorsese	Won
Los Angeles Film Critics Association Award	Best Supporting Actor	Joe Pesci	Won
Los Angeles Film Critics Association Award	Best Supporting Actress	Lorraine Bracco	Won
Los Angeles Film Critics Association Award	Best Cinematography	Michael Ballhaus	Won
National Board of Review Award	Best Supporting Actor	Joe Pesci	Won
Boston Society of Film Critics Award	Best Film	Martin Scorsese and Irwin Winkler	Won
Boston Society of Film Critics Award	Best Director	Martin Scorsese	Won
Boston Society of Film Critics Award	Best Supporting Actor	Joe Pesci	Won
Chicago Film Critics Association Award	Best Film	Martin Scorsese and Irwin Winkler	Won
Chicago Film Critics Association Award	Best Director	Martin Scorsese	Won
Chicago Film Critics Association Award	Best Supporting Actor	Joe Pesci	Won
Chicago Film Critics Association Award	Best Supporting Actress	Lorraine Bracco	Won
Chicago Film Critics Association Award	Best Screenplay	Martin Scorsese and Nicholas Pileggi	Won
National Society of Film Critics Award	Best Film	Martin Scorsese and Irwin Winkler	Won
National Society of Film Critics Award	Best Director	Martin Scorsese	Won
Bodil Award	Best American Film	Martin Scorsese and Irwin Winkler	Won

== Legacy ==
Goodfellas is No. 94 on the American Film Institute's "100 Years, 100 Movies" list and moved up to No. 92 on its AFI's 100 Years...100 Movies (10th Anniversary Edition) from 2007. In June 2008, the AFI put Goodfellas at No. 2 in the "Gangster" category on their AFI's 10 Top 10—the best ten films in ten "classic" American film genres—after polling over 1,500 people from the movie-related community.

Goodfellas was regarded as the second-best in the gangster film genre (after The Godfather). In 2000, the United States Library of Congress deemed the film "culturally significant" and selected it for preservation in the National Film Registry.

Roger Ebert named Goodfellas the "best mob movie ever" and placed it among the ten best films of the 1990s. In December 2002, a UK film critics poll in Sight & Sound ranked the film No. 4 on their list of the 10 Best Films of the Last 25 Years. Time included Goodfellas in their list of Time's All-Time 100 Movies. Channel 4 placed Goodfellas at No. 10 in their 2002 poll The 100 Greatest Films, Empire listed Goodfellas at No. 6 on their "500 Greatest Movies Of All Time," and Total Film voted Goodfellas No. 1 as the greatest film of all time. In 2006, Writers Guild of America West ranked its screenplay 41st in WGA’s list of 101 Greatest Screenplays.

Premiere listed Joe Pesci's Tommy DeVito as No. 96 on its list of "The 100 Greatest Movie Characters of All Time," calling him "perhaps the single most irredeemable character ever put on film". Empire ranked Tommy DeVito No. 59 in their "The 100 Greatest Movie Characters" poll.

The film's two-and-a-half-minute tracking shot through the Copacabana nightclub, colloquially called the "Copa shot," is widely considered one of the greatest shots of all time, and is "one of the few shots in the history of cinema readily identifiable by name." It is credited with popularizing the use of long Steadicam tracking shots in future productions, including Pulp Fiction, Boogie Nights, The Place Beyond the Pines, and the Buffy the Vampire Slayer episode "The Body.”

Goodfellas inspired director David Chase to make the HBO television series The Sopranos. He told Peter Bogdanovich, "Goodfellas is a very important movie to me and Goodfellas really plowed that ... I found that movie very funny and brutal and it felt very real. And yet that was the first mob movie that Scorsese ever dealt with a mob crew. ... as opposed to say The Godfather ... which there's something operatic about it, classical, even the clothing and the cars. You know I mean I always think about Goodfellas when they go to their mother's house that night when they're eating, you know when she brings out her painting, that stuff is great. I mean The Sopranos learned a lot from that." Indeed, the film shares a total of 27 actors with The Sopranos, including Bracco, Sirico, Imperioli, Pellegrino, Lip and Vincent, who all had roles in Chase's HBO series.

July 24, 2010, marked the 20th anniversary of the film's release. The milestone was celebrated with Henry Hill hosting a private screening for a select group of invitees at the Museum of the American Gangster in New York City.

In January 2012, it was announced that the AMC Network put a television series version of the movie in development. Pileggi was on board to co-write the adaptation with television writer and producer Jorge Zamacona.

In 2015, Goodfellas closed the Tribeca Film Festival with a screening of its 25th-anniversary remaster.

In 2020, AMC began including a content warning when airing Goodfellas: "This film includes language and/or cultural stereotypes that are inconsistent with today's standards of inclusion and tolerance and may offend some viewers." By comparison, The Godfather gets a standard "viewer discretion" warning.

American Film Institute Lists

- AFI's 100 Years... 100 Movies - #94
- AFI's 100 Years... 100 Movies (10th Anniversary Edition) - #92
- AFI's 10 Top 10 - #2 Gangster film
- AFI's 100 Years... 100 Heroes and Villains - Tommy DeVito - Nominated Villain
- AFI's 100 Years... 100 Movie Quotes - "Funny like I'm a clown? I amuse you?" - Nominated Quote

== See also ==
- List of films featuring psychopaths and sociopaths
- List of films voted the best
