= Derek Sitter =

American filmmaker, actor

Derek Sitter (born September 4, 1967) is an American filmmaker, actor, and entrepreneur. He is the founding owner of the Volcanic Theatre Pub in Bend, Oregon.

== Early life and education ==
Sitter was born and raised in McAlester, Oklahoma. At 17, he was set to join the Air Force but quickly changed gears to go into the performing arts. In 1986, he and some friends made it to the grand finals and won prize money for their rendition of "I Wanna Rock" by Twisted Sister on Puttin' on the Hits. He earned a double degree in Communications and Advertising from Northeastern State University. He studied acting at LSU, where he earned a Master of Fine Arts degree in 1994. He is an elected lifetime member of the Actors Studio. In Bend, Oregon, he founded the Actors’ Realm and the Volcanic Theatre Pub.

== Acting career ==
=== Theatre ===
In 2001, Sitter was nominated for an Ovation Award (Best Featured Actor in a Play) for his role in The Dead Boy by Joseph Pintauro. Sitter played "Will Draper" in the U.S. premiere of the play at the Laurelgrove Theatre in Los Angeles. He doubled in the role of the "Young Priest of Sheridan's Fantasy," a Jekyll and Hyde sort of role where he got to play one part good, one part evil. Sitter continued to work as a stage actor in Bend, Oregon, notably as "Mikey" in "The Spin Cycle" for Innovation Theatre Works in 2011.

=== Television ===
Year	Title	Season/Episode(s)	Role(s)
2010	Leverage	Season 3: Episode 13	Husband
2005	Zoey 101	Season 1: Episode 9	Keith
2002	Presidio Med	Season 1: Episodes 1 and 2	Dumont
1998	ER	Season 4: Episode 14	Chopper Pilot
1997	Chicago Hope	Season 4: Episode 7	Cop #2
1996	Nowhere Man	Season 1: Episode 14	Recruit #1

=== Film ===
==== Acting ====
Early forays into film acting include a role in The Murder in China Basin (1999) in which, according to Variety, he gave a "standout" performance.

==== Film production ====
As a filmmaker, Sitter made his mark with a short film called Tutu Grande (2018). He wrote and directed the film and played the lead role. The film won an award for screenplay at the LA Film Festival and a nomination at the New York Film Festival.

Two years later, he made another short film called Bugtussle, starring himself and John Mese. Bugtussle was the culmination of an earlier film written and directed by Sitter: Coyote and Old Crow (Short 2015), starring Sitter and Wayne Newscome. The plot of Bugtussle centers around the same characters, but for the 2022 production, Sitter cast himself and John Mese respectively as Coyote and Crow.

Sitter's debut as a screenwriter was a short film called Second Sleep in 2012. He based the story on his personal suffering from bipolar disorder. The film, made on a small budget with funds raised on Kickstarter, and starring Fred Lehne, was directed by Chris Kas. Sitter also wrote and directed a five-minute short called Black Cloud (Short 2016) about a depressed man driven to suicide.

== Business career ==
In 2010, he founded the Volcanic Theatre Pub in Bend which he co-owned with Don Tompos until selling it in 2023. VTP is an entertainment venue for live musical and theatrical performances as well as film screenings. Through the "Actors' Realm," Sitter also conducted acting classes there. VTP was founded in connection with the theater department at Central Oregon Community College. VTP was a high risk venue with several canceled events during the COVID-19 pandemic. Sitter sold it to John Davis of 1988 Entertainment, a fellow resident of Bend.

== Personal life ==
Sitter identifies strongly as someone living with bipolar disorder. He is outspoken about his struggles with mental health, which include depression and anxiety, and for which he has been treated since he was 21. These experiences have greatly influenced his work as a filmmaker.

He is married to Jeanne Sanders (an actress and former teacher in the Los Angeles Unified School District) and has a daughter.
