= Lorraine Bracco =

American actress (born 1954)

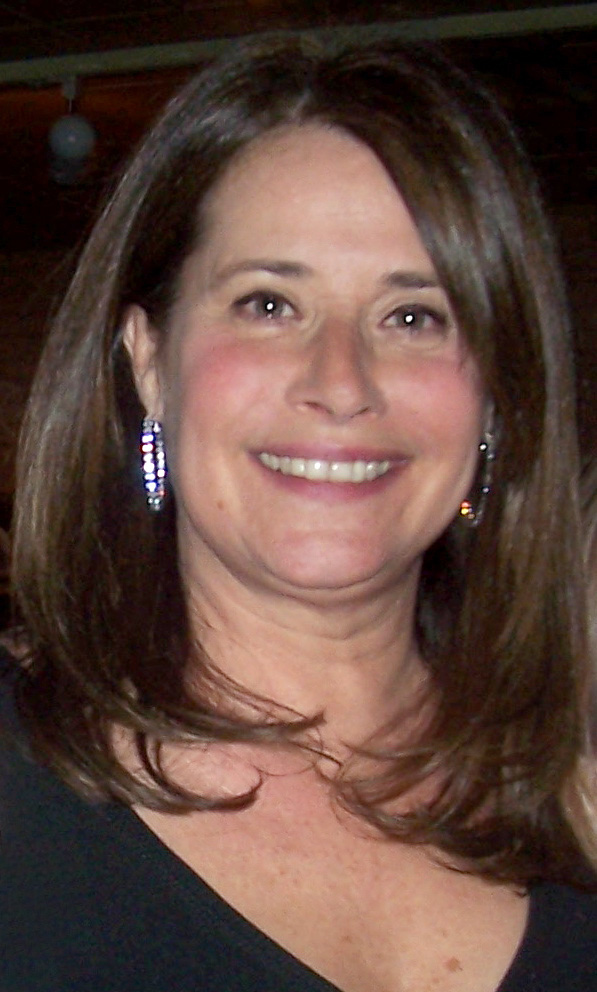
- Bracco in 2007
- Born: October 2, 1954 (age 72); New York City, U.S.
- Occupation: Actress
- Years active: 1979–present
- Spouses: Daniel Guerard (m. 1979; div. 1982) Edward James Olmos (m. 1994; div. 2002)
- Partner: Harvey Keitel (1982–1993)
- Children: 2
- Relatives: Elizabeth Bracco (sister)

Lorraine Bracco (Italian: [ˈbrakko]; born October 2, 1954) is an American actress best known for her performance as psychiatrist Jennifer Melfi on the HBO crime drama series The Sopranos (1999–2007) and for her breakthrough role portraying Karen Hill in the Martin Scorsese film Goodfellas (1990). Bracco began her career modeling in France and appeared in Italian-language films in the 1980s. Her English-language debut came in The Pick-up Artist (1987), which was followed by roles in Someone to Watch Over Me (1987), Sing (1989), and The Dream Team (1989). She has been nominated for an Academy Award, three Actor Awards, four Emmy Awards, and four Golden Globe Awards.

== Early life ==
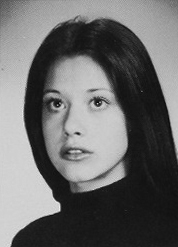
Bracco as a senior in high school in 1972

Bracco was born on October 2, 1954, in the Bay Ridge neighborhood of the Brooklyn borough of New York City. She is the daughter of Eileen (née Molyneux) and Salvatore S. Bracco Sr. She has a sister, actress Elizabeth Bracco, and a brother, Salvatore Jr. Her father was of Italian descent, while her mother was born in England, and had some French ancestry. Her parents met during World War II, marrying in Andover in 1946; Eileen would then come back with Salvatore to the United States. Bracco grew up in Hicksville, New York, on Long Island, from fourth grade, and graduated from Hicksville High School in 1972.

== Career ==
=== 1974–1989: Rise to prominence ===
Bracco moved to France in 1974, where she became a fashion model for Jean-Paul Gaultier. She lived there for about a decade. While still modeling, Bracco was approached by Marc Camoletti, who offered her a major role in the film adaptation of one of his plays, Duos sur canapé (1979). Bracco did not imagine that she could be an actress, and initially refused. She eventually made the film, but found the experience "boring" and her performance "terrible." Nevertheless, she played supporting roles in two other French films "for the money."

After one of her friends suggested that she might enjoy acting if she took some training, she took seminars with John Strasberg. Although she loved the lessons, she was still unsure of her talents. During the 1980s, she worked as a disc jockey for Radio Luxembourg. She also appeared as Paul Guilfoyle's hostage in the first season of the series Crime Story, in the episode "Hide and Go Thief". Her sister Elizabeth played a coffee shop waitress in the series pilot.

Eventually, Italian director and novelist Lina Wertmüller gave Bracco a small part in the film Camorra. "She dressed me up like an Italian woman of no means. A street woman clad in disheveled clothes, hair unkempt and all that, and threw me on the set. She was so creative. I mean, Lina accentuated my eyes with dark make-up, the way Sophia Loren used to appear in those epic roles in the '60s. And talk about talent. She's so bright and perceptive. I mean, she's just fantastic. And yes, I learned a lot from her. She's a master of her profession, and I've been blessed not only with her, but also with so many masters," recounted Bracco to Daniel Simone during a 2007 interview. The experience inspired Bracco to pursue acting.

=== 1990–2007: Goodfellas and The Sopranos ===
Bracco received her big career break when she was offered the role of mobster wife Karen Hill in the Martin Scorsese directed crime drama Goodfellas (1990). Her performance earned her Academy Award and Golden Globe Award nominations for Best Supporting Actress. She won the Los Angeles Film Critics Association Award for Best Supporting Actress and the Chicago Film Critics Association Award for Best Supporting Actress. Her other films include Someone to Watch Over Me (1987), Switch (1991), Medicine Man (1992), Radio Flyer (1992), Hackers (1995), The Basketball Diaries (1995), and Riding in Cars with Boys (2001).

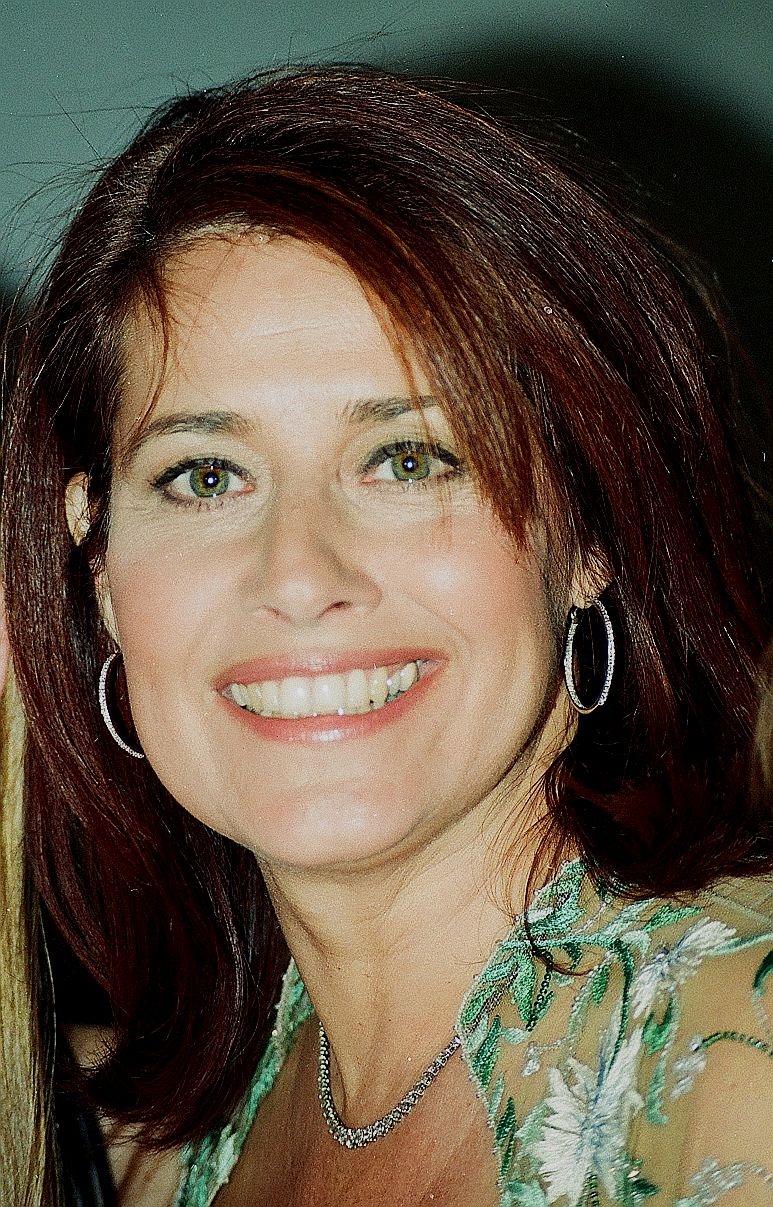
Bracco in 1997

During the audition process for The Sopranos, David Chase wanted Bracco to audition for the lead female role of Carmela Soprano. However, Bracco had read the script and was drawn to the part of psychiatrist Jennifer Melfi as she wanted to try something different and felt that the part of the highly educated Dr. Melfi would be more of a challenge for her. Bracco felt so strongly about her ability and desire to play the part that she arranged a meeting with Chase and talked him into letting her have a chance as Melfi. The role netted her three consecutive Primetime Emmy Award nominations for Outstanding Lead Actress in a Drama Series in 1999, 2000, and 2001, and at the Golden Globes for Best TV Actress in a Drama in 2000, 2001, and 2002. She lost out at the Emmys in 1999 and 2001, and at the Golden Globes in 2000 to her co-star Edie Falco. She was nominated again at the 2007 Emmy Awards for Outstanding Supporting Actress in a Drama Series, and thus was pitted against her The Sopranos co-star Aida Turturro for the award.

=== 2008–present ===
Bracco is the owner of Bracco Wines, in association with Straight-Up Brands LLC. Her line of wines was featured on the Season 1 finale of Bravo's show Top Chef in 2006. She appeared as a guest judge for the show's two-episode finale and as a special judge on Top Chef: All-Stars, in the episode titled "An Offer They Can't Refuse", which featured Italian cuisine. Bracco also appeared on a season 6 episode of Throwdown! with Bobby Flay, as a guest judge for the ravioli throwdown. From 2010 to 2016, Bracco co-starred on the TNT crime drama Rizzoli & Isles as Angela Rizzoli, mother of Jane Rizzoli, portrayed by Angie Harmon. She appeared in all 105 episodes of the series over its seven-season run. Beginning in 2016, Bracco had a recurring role as Toni on the Showtime comedy series Dice. In 2017–2018, she had a five-episode recurring role as Mayor Margaret Dutton in the CBS police drama series Blue Bloods.

Also in 2020, Bracco starred in the HGTV documentary television series My Big Italian Adventure. Shot in Sambuca di Sicilia, it chronicled her renovation of a 200-year-old house she purchased for €1 at Via Guglielmo Marconi. In 2022, Bracco worked in the Robert Zemeckis remake of Pinocchio where she voiced Sofia the Seagull. In 2023, Bracco starred in Waheed AlQawasmi's debut film Jacir as Meryl, an opioid addicted next-door neighbor of a Syrian refugee living in poverty in Memphis, Tennessee, delivering an emotionally charged performance that was dubbed "her best performance since Goodfellas."

== Personal life ==
Bracco married Frenchman Daniel Guerard in 1979; they divorced in 1982. They have one daughter, actress Margaux Guerard.

Bracco was in a 12-year relationship with actor Harvey Keitel, whom she met while living in Paris. They have one daughter, Stella Keitel (born 1985). Bracco and Keitel fought a lengthy custody battle over Stella, resulting in Bracco's depression and $2 million in legal fees.

The end of Bracco and Keitel's relationship in 1993 was triggered by her affair with actor Edward James Olmos, her co-star in A Talent for the Game. Bracco and Olmos were then married in 1994 and divorced in 2002.

Bracco is a practitioner of Shotokan Karate. In 2015, she wrote a self help book, To the Fullest: The Clean Up Your Act Plan to Lose Weight, Rejuvenate, and Be the Best You Can Be.

== Acting credits ==
=== Film ===
Year	Title	Role	Notes
1979	Duos sur canapé	Bubble	
1980	What Did I Ever Do to the Good Lord to Deserve a Wife Who Drinks in Cafes with Men?	Barbara	a.k.a. Mais qu'est-ce que j'ai fait au bon Dieu pour avoir une femme qui boit dans les cafés avec les hommes?
1981	Fais gaffe à la gaffe!	Margaux	
1985	Camorra	Uncredited	a.k.a. Un complicato intrigo di donne, vicoli e delitti
1987	The Pick-up Artist	Carla	
1987	Someone to Watch Over Me	Ellie Keegan	
1989	Sing	Miss Lombardo	
1989	The Dream Team	Riley	
1989	Up to Date	Sheila	
1989	Sea of Love	Denice Gruber	Scenes deleted
1990	Goodfellas	Karen Friedman Hill	
1991	Talent for the Game	Bobbie	
1991	Switch	Sheila Faxton	
1992	Medicine Man	Dr. Rae Crane	
1992	Radio Flyer	Mary	
1992	Traces of Red	Ellen Schofield	
1993	Even Cowgirls Get the Blues	Delores Del Ruby	
1994	Being Human	Anna	
1995	The Basketball Diaries	Mrs. Carroll	
1995	Hackers	Margo Wallace	
1996	The Liars	Helene Miller	a.k.a. Les Menteurs
1997	Silent Cradle	Helen Greg	
2000	Ladies Room	Gemma	
2001	Riding in Cars with Boys	Teresa Donofrio	
2001	Tangled	Det. Anne Andersle	
2003	Death of a Dynasty	Enchante R&B Singer #2	
2005	Crazy for Love	Sheila	
2011	Son of Morning	Leda	
2012	The Bensonhurst Spelling Bee	Unknown	Short film
2016	Monday Nights at Seven	Damian Robertson	
2019	Master Maggie	Maggie	Short film
2020	A Ring for Christmas	Margaret Moore	
2021	The Birthday Cake	Sofia	
2022	Disney's Pinocchio	Sofia the Seagull (voice)	
2022	JACIR جاسر	Meryl	
2024	The Union	Lorraine McKenna	
2024	Monster Summer	Miss Halverson	
2024	Rich Flu	Martha	
2025	Nonnas	Roberta	
2025	The Mother, the Menacer, and Me	Nancy	

=== Television ===
Year	Title	Role	Notes
1980	Commissaire Moulin	Jenny	Episode: "Le transfuge"
1986	Crime Story	Hostage	Episode: "Hide and Go Thief"
1993	Scam	Maggie Rohrer	TV movie
1994	Getting Gotti	Diane Giacalone	TV movie
1996	Reckoning	Kits Maitland	TV movie
1998	The Taking of Pelham One Two Three	Det. Ray	TV movie
1999–2007	The Sopranos	Jennifer Melfi	Main role
2001	Sex in Our Century	Narrator	TV movie
2003	Custody of the Heart	Claire Raphael	TV movie
2005	Law & Order: Trial by Jury	Karla Grizano	Episode: "Vigilante"
2006	Top Chef	Herself/Guest Judge	Season 1, Episode 12: "Finale Part Two"
2007	Snowglobe	Rose Moreno	TV movie
2008	Long Island Confidential	Norah Larkin	TV movie
2008	Lipstick Jungle	Janice Lasher	2 episodes
2010	Law & Order: Criminal Intent	Halfway House Matron	Episode: "Disciple"
2010–2016	Rizzoli & Isles	Angela Rizzoli	Main role
2011	I Married a Mobster	Narrator	10 episodes
2011	Top Chef	Herself/Guest Judge	Episode: "An Offer They Can't Refuse"
2014	Mulaney	Vaughn	Episode: "Sweet Jane"
2016	Dice	Toni	2 episodes
2016	BoJack Horseman	Dr. Janet (voice)	2 episodes
2017–2018	Blue Bloods	Mayor Margaret Dutton	6 episodes
2018	Summer Camp Island	The Werewolf Queen (voice)	Episode: "Hedgehog Werewolf"
2019	The Dead Wives Club	Herself/host	6 episodes
2019–2023	Jerk	Tim's mother	12 episodes
2020	AJ and the Queen	Herself	Episode: "Baton Rouge"
2020	My Big Italian Adventure	Herself/host	3 episodes (HGTV)
2022	Welcome to Mama's	Maria "Mama" Tucci	TV movie; AKA The Perfect Recipe
2024	Wise Guy: David Chase and the Sopranos	Herself	Episode: "Part 1 & 2"

=== Theater ===
Year	Title	Role	Venue	Ref.
2003	The Graduate	Mrs. Robinson (replacement)	Plymouth Theatre, Broadway	

== Awards and nominations ==
Year	Association	Category	Nominated work	Result
1990	Academy Awards	Best Supporting Actress	Goodfellas	Nominated
1990	Golden Globe Awards	Best Supporting Actress – Motion Picture	Goodfellas	Nominated
1990	Chicago Film Critics Association	Best Supporting Actress	Goodfellas	Won
1990	Los Angeles Film Critics Association	Best Supporting Actress	Goodfellas	Won
1990	New York Film Critics Circle	Best Supporting Actress	Goodfellas	Nominated
1999	Primetime Emmy Awards	Outstanding Lead Actress in a Drama Series	The Sopranos (episode: "The Legend of Tennessee Moltisanti")	Nominated
2000	Primetime Emmy Awards	Outstanding Lead Actress in a Drama Series	The Sopranos (episode: "Big Girls Don't Cry")	Nominated
2001	Primetime Emmy Awards	Outstanding Lead Actress in a Drama Series	The Sopranos (episode: "Employee of the Month")	Nominated
2007	Primetime Emmy Awards	Outstanding Supporting Actress in a Drama Series	The Sopranos (episode: "The Blue Comet")	Nominated
1999	Golden Globe Awards	Best Actress – Television Series Drama	The Sopranos (season 1)	Nominated
2000	Golden Globe Awards	Best Actress – Television Series Drama	The Sopranos (season 2)	Nominated
2001	Golden Globe Awards	Best Actress – Television Series Drama	The Sopranos (season 3)	Nominated
1999	Actor Awards	Outstanding Female Actor in a Drama Series	The Sopranos (season 1)	Nominated
1999	Actor Awards	Outstanding Ensemble in a Drama Series	The Sopranos (season 1)	Won
2000	Actor Awards	Outstanding Ensemble in a Drama Series	The Sopranos (season 2)	Nominated
2001	Actor Awards	Outstanding Female Actor in a Drama Series	The Sopranos (season 3)	Nominated
2001	Actor Awards	Outstanding Ensemble in a Drama Series	The Sopranos (season 3)	Nominated
2002	Actor Awards	Outstanding Female Actor in a Drama Series	The Sopranos (season 4)	Nominated
2002	Actor Awards	Outstanding Ensemble in a Drama Series	The Sopranos (season 4)	Nominated
2004	Actor Awards	Outstanding Ensemble in a Drama Series	The Sopranos (season 5)	Nominated
2006	Actor Awards	Outstanding Ensemble in a Drama Series	The Sopranos (season 6 - Part 1)	Nominated
2007	Actor Awards	Outstanding Ensemble in a Drama Series	The Sopranos (season 6 - Part 2)	Won
2000	Satellite Awards	Best Actress – Television Series Drama	The Sopranos	Nominated
2008	Monte-Carlo Television Festival	Outstanding Actress – Drama Series	The Sopranos	Nominated
1993	Razzie Awards	Worst Actress	Medicine Man	Nominated
1993	Razzie Awards	Worst Actress	Traces of Red	Nominated
2023	Razzie Awards	Worst Supporting Actress	Walt Disney's Pinocchio	Nominated
2023	Reel East Texas Film Festival	Best Actress – Feature Film	Jacir	Won

== Bibliography ==
- Bracco, Lorraine (2006). On the Couch. Putnam Adult. ISBN 0-399-15356-X.
- Bracco, Lorraine; Davis, Lisa V. (2015). To the Fullest: The Clean Up Your Act Plan to Lose Weight, Rejuvenate, and Be the Best You Can Be. Rodale Books. ISBN 978-0-39-919960-8.

== See also ==
- List of celebrities who own wineries and vineyards
