= Antonio Mastrogiacomo =

Italian politician

Member of the Chamber of Deputies of Italy
- In office 29 June 1987 – 22 April 1992
- Constituency: Bari

Mayor of Adelfia
- In office 28 July 1988 – 7 June 1993
- Succeeded by: Francesco Pirolo

Personal details
- Born: 18 December 1935 Adelfia, Italy
- Died: 19 November 2022 (aged 86) Adelfia, Italy
- Party: PSI

Antonio Mastrogiacomo (18 December 1935 – 19 November 2022) was an Italian politician. A member of the Italian Socialist Party, he served in the Chamber of Deputies from 1987 to 1992.

Mastrogiacomo died in Adelfia on 19 November 2022 at the age of 86.
