= Gina Mastrogiacomo =

American actress

- Born: Gina Mastrogiacomo; November 5, 1961; Great Neck, Long Island, United States
- Died: May 2, 2001 (aged 39); California, United States
- Occupation: Actress
- Years active: 1986–2001

Gina Mastrogiacomo (November 5, 1961 – May 2, 2001) was an American actress.

== Career ==
Mastrogiacomo made her film debut as Roxie in the 1987 fantasy comedy film Harry and the Hendersons. She next starred as the lead female character, Ginny, in Richard Haines's 1989 sci-fi comedy Space Avenger, an independent film which debuted at the Toronto Film Festival and parodied the Alien franchise and other sci-fi horror films like The Hidden. Mastrogiacomo's performance impressed Martin Scorsese, who decided to cast her in his hit 1990 gangster film Goodfellas after watching the film. In that film she portrayed Janice Rossi, Ray Liotta's mistress, and delivered a performance praised for its passionate and realistic delivery. Her performance is praised as "vivid and immediate", which has not been reflected in retrospectives and oral histories of the film because of her early death. Also in 1990, Mastrogiacomo starred in the 1990 musical television film An East Side Story. In 1991 she portrayed Louise in Spike Lee's Jungle Fever, one of several actors who had also appeared in Goodfellas. Variety critic Tony Scott wrote that "Mastrogiacomo excels as Maggie's loyal friend Gloria" in the USA Network's 1995 television film Tall, Dark, and Deadly. In 2000, she played the role of Jenny Uphouse in the X-Files episode "Chimera", playing a character having an affair with the sheriff as a form of revenge against middle-class housewife snobbery.

== Personal life ==
Mastrogiacomo was raised in Oceanside, Long Island, New York, and died in California on May 2, 2001, at age 39 of a bacterial heart infection.

== Filmography ==
=== Film ===
| Year | Title | Role | Notes |
|---|---|---|---|
| 1989 | Alien Space Avenger | Ginny | |
| 1990 | Goodfellas | Janice Rossi | |
| 1990 | East Side Story | - | |
| 1991 | Jungle Fever | Louise | |
| 1991 | The Naked Gun 2½: The Smell of Fear | Sex Shop Worker | |
| 1994 | Motorcycle Gang | Waitress | TV movie |
| 1995 | Tall, Dark and Deadly | Gloria Bowers | TV movie |
| 1996 | Bloodhounds | Liz Moore | TV movie |
| 1998 | The Con | Debbie | TV movie |
| 1998 | Lone Greasers | Rockin' Lexie | Short |
| 1998 | Conversations in Limbo | - | Short |

=== Television ===
| Year | Title | Role | Notes |
|---|---|---|---|
| 1991 | The Fanelli Boys | - | Episode: "Rope a Dope" |
| 1993 | Harry and the Hendersons | Roxie Newton | Episode: "The Three Faces of Brett" |
| 1994 | NYPD Blue | Chicky | Episode: "A Sudden Fish" |
| 1995 | Under Suspicion | Nora | Episode: "Sex Harassment/Corruption Case" |
| 1996 | Seinfeld | Prostitute | Episode: "The Wig Master" |
| 1998 | ER | Ms. Myra | Episode: "A Hole in the Heart" |
| 2000 | The X-Files | Jenny Uphouse | Episode: "Chimera" |
