= Museum of the American Gangster =

Museum in Manhattan, New York, U.S. (2010-2023)

Coordinates: 40.72790°N 73.98577°W

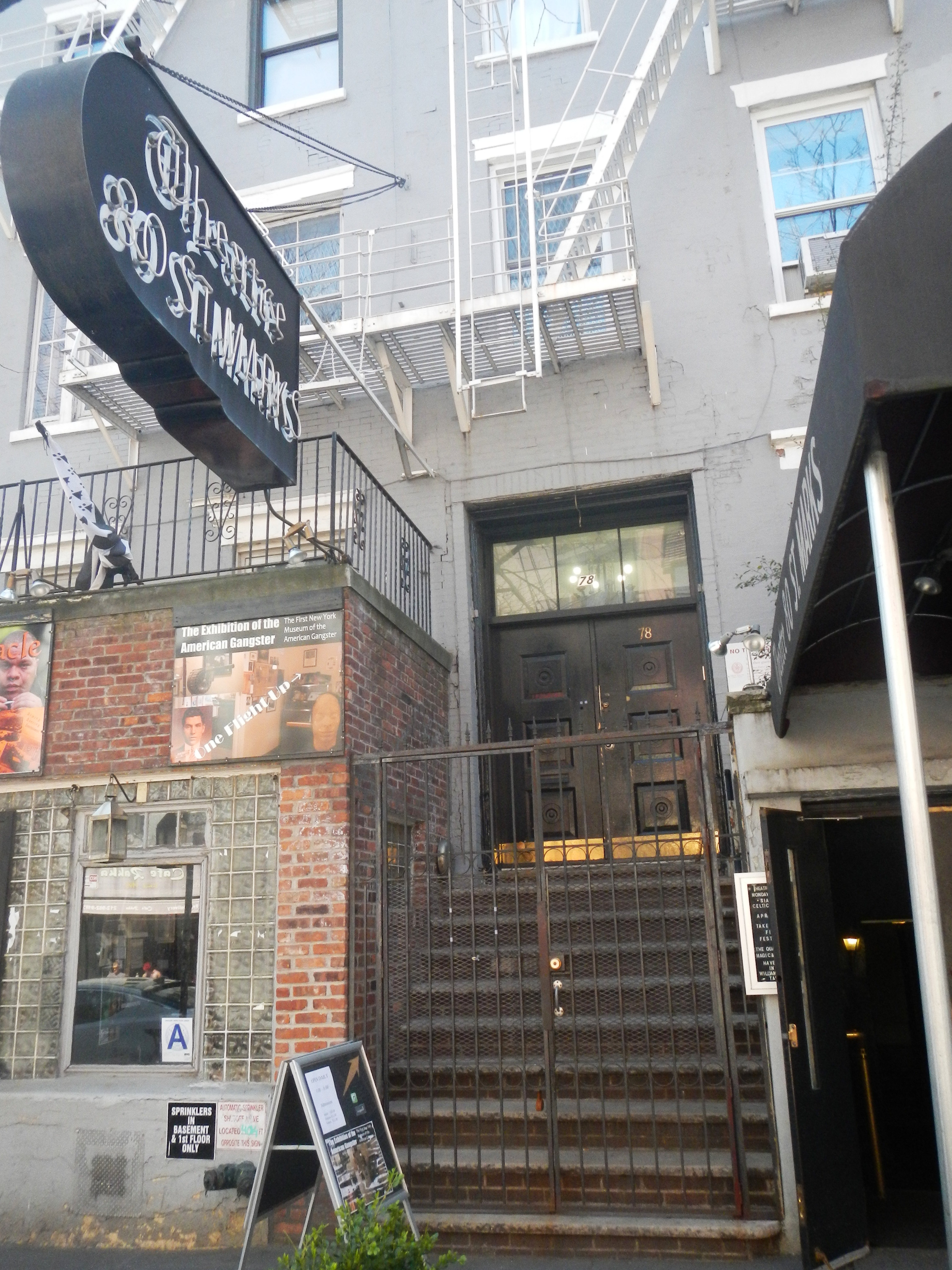

The Museum of the American Gangster was a two-room museum located at 80 St. Mark's Place in the East Village, Manhattan, New York City. Opened in 2010, it was located upstairs from a former speakeasy in a neighborhood once frequented by Al Capone, Lucky Luciano, and John Gotti. Its Exhibition of the American Gangster was "founded to preserve newspapers, photographs and other original documents from the Prohibition Era". The museum's collection of memorabilia of organized crime in America includes John Dillinger's death masks, bullets from the Saint Valentine's Day massacre investigation, and a bullet from the shooting of Pretty Boy Floyd. The former speakeasy has a history of its own; the speakeasy was run by Walter Scheib. It was also possible to tour the old speakeasy.

July 24, 2010 marked the twentieth anniversary of the release of Goodfellas. This milestone was celebrated with a private screening hosted by Henry Hill for a select group of invitees at the Museum of the American Gangster.

Temporarily closed due to the COVID 19 pandemic, the museum announced in December 2021 that it was in danger of closing permanently if it lost the space it shared with Theatre 80.

The museum was evicted together with Theatre 80 in 2023.
