= Karen Friedman Hill =

Wife of mobster Henry Hill (born 1946)

- Born: Karen B. Friedman; January 16, 1946 (age 80); New York City, New York, U.S.
- Spouse(s): Henry Hill (1965–1989; divorce finalized 2002)
- Children: 2

Karen B. Friedman Hill (née Friedman; born January 16, 1946) is an American woman known for her involvement in the American Mafia through her husband Henry Hill, who was an associate of the Lucchese crime family. The events of their lives were chronicled in the 1990 film Goodfellas and several books.

== Early life ==
She was born in New York City and raised on Long Island in Lawrence, Nassau County, New York, part of the Five Towns, the daughter of Jewish parents.

In 1965, Karen Friedman met Henry Hill through Paul Vario, who insisted that Hill accompany his son on a double date at Frank "Frankie the Wop" Manzo's restaurant, Villa Capra. According to Friedman, the date was disastrous, and Hill stood her up at the next dinner date. Afterwards, the two began going on dates at the Copacabana and other nightclubs, where Friedman was introduced to Hill's outwardly impressive lifestyle. The two later got married in a large North Carolina wedding, attended by most of Henry Hill's gangster friends.

Henry Hill wrote in his 1994 book Gangsters and Goodfellas that Tommy DeSimone tried to rape Karen while Hill was in jail. Karen was meanwhile having an affair with Vario. After DeSimone attempted to rape Karen, one theory is that Vario reportedly took revenge by telling the Gambino crime family that DeSimone was the one who killed made man Billy Batts. They in turn killed DeSimone.

== Later life ==
Henry Hill was arrested in 1980 on a narcotics-trafficking charge, and with a long sentence hanging over him, he agreed to become an informant. The entire family entered the U.S. Marshals' Witness Protection Program in 1980, changed their names, and were moved around to several undisclosed locations including Seattle, Washington; Cincinnati, Ohio; Omaha, Nebraska; Butte, Montana; and Independence, Kentucky.

In 1987, Henry Hill was convicted of cocaine trafficking in a federal court in Seattle and expelled from the witness protection program. In 1990, Karen filed for divorce after 23 years of marriage. The divorce was finalized in 2002. After their divorce, Henry remarried and fathered another child.

Karen Hill continues to use an alias to protect her identity, as do her two children, Gregg and Gina. Her children released a book in 2004, titled On the Run: A Mafia Childhood, that tells their own version of their experience with the Mafia. In the book, Gregg and Gina discuss how their maternal grandparents and Karen's two younger sisters, Sandy and Adrianne, helped take care of them, when Karen and Henry were away committing crimes.

Henry died on June 12, 2012, at the age of 69, from heart failure in Los Angeles.

== Portrayal in media ==
Karen Friedman Hill was portrayed by Lorraine Bracco in the 1990 film Goodfellas, directed by Martin Scorsese, with a script based on Nicholas Pileggi's 1985 book Wiseguy. Bracco did not meet with Karen Hill prior to filming. Bracco was nominated for the Academy Award for Best Supporting Actress for her portrayal of Hill, but lost to Whoopi Goldberg for Ghost.
