= I Love Us =

2021 film by Danny A. Abeckaser

- Official release poster
- Directed by: Danny A. Abeckaser
- Written by: Kosta Kondilopoulos
- Produced by: Danny A. Abeckaser; Kyle Stefanski; Mike Hermosa; Jon Brewer; Jeff Hoffman
- Starring: Danny A. Abeckaser; Katie Cassidy; Jasper Polish; Harlow Jane; Jackie Cruz; Robert Davi
- Cinematography: Hernán Toro
- Edited by: Eric Yalkut Chase
- Music by: Lionel Cohen
- Production companies: 2B Films; Wild7 Films; Above the Clouds
- Distributed by: Vision Films
- Release date: September 17, 2021
- Running time: 92 minutes
- Country: United States
- Language: English

I Love Us is a 2021 American romantic crime drama film directed by Danny A. Abeckaser and written by Kosta Kondilopoulos. The film stars Danny A. Abeckaser, Katie Cassidy, Jasper Polish, Harlow Jane, Jackie Cruz, and Robert Davi. It was released in the United States in select theaters and through video on demand on September 17, 2021, by Vision Films.

== Cast ==
- Danny A. Abeckaser as Sammy Silver
- Katie Cassidy as Laura Fenton
- Harlow Jane as Audrey Fenton
- Jasper Polish as Rachel Fenton
- Robert Davi as Harvey Silverman
- James Madio as Richie Gould
- Greg Finley as Rob Fenton
- David Elliot as David Dallas
- Courtney Lopez as Maria Campos
- Jacqueline Chavez as Ruby Ellis
- Elya Baskin as Ira Prince
- Duke Christian George III as Omar
- Duke Jackson George IV as Omar's boy
- George Andreakos as Lorenzo
- Ray Bouderau as Garo
- Diana Madison as Principal Gloria West

== Production ==
Filming wrapped in Los Angeles in March 2021.

== Reception ==
Alan Ng of Film Threat rated the film a 7.5 out of 10.
