= Bardejov (film) =

- Directed by: Danny A. Abeckaser
- Written by: Shmuel Lynn
- Produced by: Emil A. Fish
- Starring: Robert Davi; Danny A. Abeckaser
- Cinematography: Barry Markowitz
- Music by: Lionel Cohen
- Distributed by: Gravitas Ventures
- Release date: March 19, 2024
- Country: United States
- Language: English

Bardejov is a 2024 American historical war film written by Shmuel Lynn, directed by Danny A. Abeckaser and starring Robert Davi and Abeckaser.

Based on a true story, Bardejov reveals the daring plan devised by Rafuel Lowy (played by Robert Davi), a successful wine-maker and community leader, to save the young women of Bardejov from being included in the first official Jewish transport to Auschwitz by injecting them with typhus.

On a peaceful morning in 1942, the Jews of Bardejov were awoken by the sound of thunderous drumming. It was the Young Hlinka Guards—Slovak Nazi collaborators—who plastered the town with posters announcing a Nazi work order: Every Jew must report to work. No exceptions. Lowy meets with the Bardejov Jewish Council to discuss their next course of action.

Shortly thereafter, more posters are put up with new orders: All Jewish girls will be deported for work in a shoe factory in the East. No exceptions. Lowy gathers the Council to devise a way to keep their girls home, or keep them safe while working in the shoe factory. But, as they soon learn, there is no shoe factory. The girls were going to be deported to Auschwitz. With time running out, and mounting suspicion from the Hlinka, Lowy and his community devise a plan to save their girls: to smuggle a vial of Typhus into Bardejov and infect the girls, with hopes of forcing a quarantine before imminent deportation.

== Cast ==
- Danny A. Abeckaser as Dr. Atlas
- Robert Davi as Lowey
- Kyle Stefanski
- Dean Miroshnikov
- Darren Weiss as Fredrik
- Omer Hazan as Hershel

== Production ==
Filming took place in Israel and Bardejov.

== Release ==
In December 2023, it was announced that the North American distribution rights to the film were acquired by Gravitas Ventures. The film was released on VOD on March 19, 2024.

== Reception ==
Terry Sherwood of Film Threat rated the film an 8 out of 10.
