= Mob Town =

Mob Town may refer to:

- Mob Town (1941 film), a crime film starring the Dead End Kids and the Little Tough Guys
- Mob Town (2019 film), a crime drama film starring David Arquette, Jamie-Lynn Sigler, Jennifer Esposito and Danny A. Abeckaser
