= Club Life (2015 film) =

- Poster
- Directed by: Fabrizio Conte
- Written by: Danny A. Abeckaser; Ryan O'Nan; Ryan Vallan
- Produced by: Danny A. Abeckaser; Per Melita
- Starring: Jerry Ferrara; Danny A. Abeckaser; Jessica Szohr; Robert Davi; Ryan O'Nan; Tovah Feldshuh; Jay R. Ferguson
- Cinematography: Daniele Napolitano
- Edited by: Danny Rafic
- Music by: Gilad Benamram
- Production companies: Radar Pictures; 2B Films
- Distributed by: The Orchard
- Release date: May 29, 2015
- Running time: 86 minutes
- Country: United States
- Language: English

Club Life is a 2015 American drama film directed by Fabrizio Conte and starring Jerry Ferrara, Danny A. Abeckaser, Jessica Szohr, Robert Davi, Ryan O'Nan, Tovah Feldshuh and Jay R. Ferguson.

== Cast ==
- Jerry Ferrara as Johnny D
- Danny A. Abeckaser as Mark
- Robert Davi as Bobby
- Tovah Feldshuh
- Jessica Szohr as Tanya
- Jay R. Ferguson as Steven
- Ryan O'Nan as Sebastian

== Release ==
The film was released in select theaters on May 29, 2015.

== Reception ==
The film has a 20% rating on Rotten Tomatoes based on five reviews.

The Hollywood Reporter gave the film a negative review: "Lacking the dramatic substance that would make us care about its central character, Club Life lives up to its setting in that it's quickly forgotten by the next day."

Gary Goldstein of the Los Angeles Times also gave the film a negative review and wrote, "...the film is undermined by choppy editing and a penchant for hoary aphorisms and forced gravitas."
