= First We Take Brooklyn =

2018 American crime thriller film

- Film poster
- Directed by: Danny A. Abeckaser
- Written by: Danny A. Abeckaser; Jon Carlo
- Produced by: Danny A. Abeckaser
- Starring: Danny A. Abeckaser; AnnaLynne McCord; Harvey Keitel
- Cinematography: Hernán Toro
- Edited by: David Leonard
- Music by: Lionel Cohen
- Production company: 2B Films
- Distributed by: 4Digital Media
- Release date: February 7, 2018
- Running time: 91 minutes
- Country: United States
- Language: English

First We Take Brooklyn, also known as Brooklyn Guns, is a 2018 American crime thriller drama film directed by Danny A. Abeckaser and starring Abeckaser, AnnaLynne McCord and Harvey Keitel.

== Plot ==
Mikki Levy is stunned when he's granted an early release from an Israeli prison, and he soon moves in with his uncle in New York City. Unfortunately, he eventually becomes embroiled in a conflict with the Russian mob, which elicits memories of the lengths he went to in order to survive in prison.

== Cast ==
- Danny A. Abeckaser as Mikki Levy
- AnnaLynne McCord as Esther
- Harvey Keitel as Anatoly
- Charlotte McKinney as Julie
- Kathrine Narducci as Gale
- Stevie Guttman as Mendel
- Kyle Stefanski as Ahmed
