= Stand Up Guy =

Stand Up Guy or stand-up guy may refer to:

- Stand-up comedian
- Stand Up Guys, 2012 American film
- A Stand Up Guy, 2016 American film
- In Memory of Some Stand Up Guys, album by C.Gambino
- Who's Sorry Now: The True Story of a Stand-Up Guy, memoir by Joe Pantoliano
- "Stand Up Guy", song by Mark Knopfler from his album Shangri-La
