= The Engineer (film) =

2023 American film by Danny A. Abeckaser

- Directed by: Danny A. Abeckaser
- Written by: Kosta Kondilopoulous
- Produced by: Danny A. Abeckaser; Yoav Gross
- Starring: Emile Hirsch
- Cinematography: Barry Markowitz
- Edited by: Eric Yalkut Chase; Steve Hansel
- Music by: Lionel Cohen
- Production companies: Lionsgate Studios; Grindstone Entertainment Group; 2B Entertainment
- Distributed by: Lionsgate
- Release date: August 18, 2023
- Running time: 93 minutes
- Country: United States
- Language: English

The Engineer is a 2023 American action film written by Kosta Kondilopoulous, directed by Danny A. Abeckaser and starring Emile Hirsch.

== Plot ==
The film follows the biggest manhunt in the history of Israel to find Yahya Ayyash, the chief bombmaker of Hamas who oversaw a series of Palestinian suicide attacks in Israel in the middle of the 1990s.

== Cast ==
- Emile Hirsch as Etan
- Angel Bonanni as Avi
- Danny A. Abeckaser as Yakov
- Tzachi Halevy as Gili
- Oshri Cohen
- Dan Mor as Tamas
- Omer Hazan as Levi
- Stefani Yunger
- Kyle Stefanski as Henry
- Yarden Toussia-Cohen as Fanni
- Adam Haloon as The Engineer
- Lee Keinan as Al-Soowi
- Robert Davi as Senator David Adler

== Production ==
Hirsch's official casting as the lead was announced in June 2022.

== Release ==
The film was released on August 18, 2023.

== Reception ==
The film has no rating on Rotten Tomatoes based on four reviews.

Dennis Harvey of Variety gave the film a negative review and wrote that it "...feels very much like an American B-movie stab at turning Israeli anti-terrorist operations of 30 years ago into formulaic action fodder — without much action, even."
