= Vincent Laresca =

American actor

- Born: January 21, 1974 (age 52); New York City, New York, U.S.
- Occupations: Actor; restaurant owner
- Years active: 1992–present

Vincent Laresca (born January 21, 1974) is an American actor and restaurant owner.

== Early life ==
Laresca is from Queens, New York. He is of Panamanian and Italian descent. At eight years old, he was spotted on the street by an acting coach after doing an impression of a gangster. The coach subsequently offered him free acting lessons for four years. He studied at Purchase College for two years before dropping out and moving to Los Angeles to pursue acting.

== Career ==
=== Acting ===
Laresca made his film debut at seventeen years old in the 1992 film Juice as Radames.

In 1996, he appeared in Baz Luhrmann's film William Shakespeare's Romeo + Juliet. In 1997, he had a supporting role in the short-lived Fox ensemble drama 413 Hope St. In 2004, he appeared in the epic biographical film The Aviator. He has also had major supporting roles on 24, CSI: Miami and Weeds.

From 2016 to 2018, Laresca had a main role in the Jennifer Lopez-led NBC series Shades of Blue as NYPD Detective Carlos Espada. Following the show's conclusion, Laresca was attached to the procedural crime drama Blood Ties, although no updates have been made since 2018. In 2019, he appeared in the crime drama film Mob Town. He starred in the independent crime thriller Inside Man in 2023. The following year, he appeared as Dennis Hernandez, the father of Aaron Hernandez, in the series American Sports Story.

=== Restaurants ===
Laresca has owned many bars and restaurants in the Los Angeles area.

In 2007, he opened the lounge bar Villa in West Hollywood, which later became known as a hangout for Hollywood celebrities. He opened the Spanish-inspired supper club Premiere in 2010. In 2012, he opened the Western-themed Outpost Restaurant. The following year, he opened the American bar and restaurant Rusty Mullet. He founded the cocktail bar Blue Collar Pub on Fairfax Avenue in 2014. In 2023, Laresca opened the speakeasy bar Cold Shoulder, a sister location to Blue Collar Pub, as well as the Mexican restaurant Roadside Taco in Studio City. In 2025, he opened Bar Jubilee, a carnivalesque neighborhood bar, on the Sunset Strip.

== Filmography ==
=== Film ===
Year	Title	Role	Notes
1992	Juice	Radames	
1992	Bad Lieutenant	J.C.	
1994	I Like It Like That	Angel	
1995	Money Train	Subway Robber #1	
1996	The Substitute	Rodriguez	
1996	Basquiat	Vincent	
1996	Ripe	Jimmy	
1996	Extreme Measures	Patches	
1996	The Associate	José, Plaza Waiter	
1996	William Shakespeare's Romeo + Juliet	Abra	
1996	I'm Not Rappaport	Renaldo	
1997	Arresting Gena	Bopo	
1997	Cop Land	Medic #2	
1997	The Real Blonde	Trey	
1997	The Devil's Advocate	Big Guy #1	
1998	Music from Another Room	Jesus	
1999	Forever Mine	Javier Cesti	
1999	Just One Time	Nick	
1999	Flawless	Raymond Camacho	
2000	Animal Factory	Ernie	
2000	Before Night Falls	Jose Abreu	
2001	K-PAX	Navarro	
2002	Empire	Jimmy	
2002	Hard Cash	Nikita	
2003	Hollywood Homicide	Correction Officer Rodriguez	
2004	The Aviator	Jorge	
2005	Coach Carter	Renny	
2005	Kiss Kiss Bang Bang	Aurelio	
2005	Lords of Dogtown	Chino	
2006	The Fast and the Furious: Tokyo Drift	Case Worker	
2006	El Cantante	Ralph	
2006	.45	Jose	
2006	National Lampoon's TV: The Movie	Jose Carlos, Drug Lord	
2007	Gardener of Eden	Pavon	
2008	Drillbit Taylor	Fence	
2008	The Longshots	Pop Warner Official #1	
2008	Lakeview Terrace	Second Officer	
2010	Unthinkable	Agent Leandro	
2010	Devil	Henry	
2011	Gun Hill Road	Hector	
2012	The Amazing Spider-Man	Construction Worker	
2013	Runner Runner	Sergeant Barrancas	
2013	Fairfield County	Hector	Short
2014	Asthma	Painter	
2015	Hot Pursuit	Felipe Riva	
2019	Once Upon a Time in Hollywood	Land Pirate	
2019	Mob Town	Benny the Meat Guy	
2023	Inside Man	James Curtis	

=== Television ===
Year	Title	Role	Notes
1992; 2004	Law & Order	Danny / Feo Ruiz	2 episodes
1994	The Cosby Mysteries	Fuenta Partage	Episodes: "The Lottery Winner Murders"
1994–1996	New York Undercover	Hector Belaflores	2 episodes
1997–1998	413 Hope St.	Carlos Martinez	Recurring role
1998	Touched by an Angel	Pvt. Tomás Parades	Episode: "God and Country"
2000	Chicago Hope	Dr. Alverez	Episode: "Letting Go"
2001	The District	Reggie Garland	Episode: "Foreign Affair"
2002	NYPD Blue	Tito Perez	Episode: "Humpty Dumped"
2002	The Twilight Zone	Buddy	Episode: "The Lineman"
2003–2004	24	Hector Salazar	12 episodes
2003	Tru Calling	Marco	2 episodes
2005	Law & Order: Criminal Intent	Antonio Morales	Episodes: "Saving Face"
2005	Weeds	Alejandro	4 episodes
2006	CSI: Miami	Antonio Riaz	3 episodes
2007	Numbers	Che Lobo	Episode: "One Hour"
2007	CSI: Crime Scene Investigation	Gino Aquino	Episode: "Lying Down with Dogs"
2009	Dollhouse	Mr. Sunshine	Episode: "Ghost"
2009	CSI: NY	Al Santiago	Episode: "Battle Scars"
2010	NCIS: Los Angeles	Memo Torres	Episode: "Borderline"
2011	The Good Wife	Detective Navarro	Episode: "Breaking Up"
2011	Blue Bloods	Salazar	Episode: "To Tell the Truth"
2011	Hawthorne		3 episodes
2011	Suits	Kenny Verdasco	Episode: "Undefeated"
2011	Person of Interest	Detective Molina	Episode: "Mission Creep"
2012	The Unknown	C.O. Belial	Episode: "Life Sentence"
2013	Graceland	Jangles Cortes	5 episodes
2013	Law & Order: Special Victims Unit	State Senator Alejandro Muñoz	Episode: "October Surprise"
2013	Agents of S.H.I.E.L.D.	Tony Diaz	Episode: "FZZT"
2015	Better Call Saul	Detective #2	Episode: "Nacho"
2016	The Night Of		Episode: "A Dark Crate"
2016–2018	Shades of Blue	Carlos Espada	Main role
2023	Bosch: Legacy	Agent Lucas Jones	Recurring role
2024	American Sports Story	Dennis Hernandez	Recurring role
