= Blackjack: The Jackie Ryan Story =

- Directed by: Danny A. Abeckaser
- Written by: Antonio Macia
- Produced by: Danny A. Abeckaser; Vincent Maggio
- Starring: Greg Finley
- Production company: 2B Films
- Distributed by: Gravitas Ventures
- Release date: October 30, 2020
- Running time: 98 minutes
- Country: United States
- Language: English

Blackjack: The Jackie Ryan Story is a 2020 American biographical sports drama film directed by Danny A. Abeckaser and starring Greg Finley as Brooklyn-based streetball player Jack Ryan.

== Cast ==
- Ashley Greene as Jenny Burke
- Greg Finley as Jackie Ryan
- Brandon Thomas Lee as Billy Ryan
- David Arquette as Big Jack
- Robert Davi as Father Brennan
- Bo Dietl as Eddie Falcone
- Tara Westwood as Susan Ryan
- Sean Avery as Dino Garibaldi
- James Madio as Marty Doyle
- Michael Rapaport as Bill Fitch
- Ben Lyons as Coach Carlisle
- Moise Morancy as Gill Turner
- Geoffrey Cantor as Peter Vecsey

The Harlem Wizards also appear in the film.

== Release ==
It was announced that Gravitas Ventures acquired worldwide distribution rights to the film in May 2020.

The film was released on October 30, 2020.

== Reception ==
Marina Gordon of Common Sense Media awarded the film two stars out of five and wrote, "Uneven basketball biopic has language, drinking, drugs.".
