= Little Thieves, Big Thieves =

100 años de perdón : Little thieves, big thieves
- Directed by: Alejandro Saderman
- Written by: Carlos González; Henry Herrera
- Produced by: Ezequiel Burguillos; Maye Larotonda
- Starring: Orlando Urdaneta; Daniel Lugo; Aroldo Betancourt
- Cinematography: Hernán Toro
- Edited by: Giuliano Ferrioli
- Music by: Julio d'Escriván
- Distributed by: Alejandro Saderman Producciones
- Release dates: September 17, 1998 (TIFF); March 21, 2002 (Germany)
- Running time: 100 minutes
- Country: Venezuela
- Language: Spanish

Little Thieves, Big Thieves (Spanish: 100 años de perdón) is a 1998 Venezuelan gangster comedy film directed by Alejandro Saderman. The film premiered at the 1998 Toronto International Film Festival and went on to screen at the 1999 Sundance Film Festival.

== Plot ==
On Christmas Eve amidst a nationwide financial scandal, adman Horacio hatches a plan to rob the Pan-American Bank with his old childhood buddies Valmore, Rogelio, and Vicente, who are all in dire straits money-wise.

The men pose as officials and arrive at the bank just after the new year, only to discover the bank's president has already transferred the bail-out money to offshore accounts, and that suspect accountant Pujol has gotten there ahead of them.

The gang mistakes a visiting commercial shoot for TV news cameras, prompting the police to surround the building and leading to a standoff.

== Cast ==
- Orlando Urdaneta as Horacio
- Daniel Lugo as Valmore
- Aroldo Betancourt as Rogelio
- Mariano Álvarez as Vicente
- Elluz Peraza as Lucía Carvajal
- Flavio Caballero as Juan Carlos
- Alicia Plaza as Rita
- Armando Gota as Pujol
- Aponte as Presidente del Banco
- Basilio Álvarez as Chofer de Taxi

== Critical reception ==
Eddie Cockrell of Variety wrote, "Well-written, often humorous pic knows it strolls close to American action genres and runs with that, riffing on themes from 'Ocean's Eleven,' 'Die Hard,' 'Mad City' and others. There’s even specific mention of 'Dog Day Afternoon,' including an updated spin on one of that film’s key subplots. Ancillary characters are well drawn, and each has a chance for a moment in the spotlight when the standoff takes on a party atmosphere (“The best kidnapping of my life,” claims one)."

Comparatively, Ted Shen of the Chicago Reader wrote, "Saderman alternates hapless burglar comedy (The Lavender Hill Mob) with tense hostage drama (Dog Day Afternoon) but fails to find the right balance: after a while the bumbling exploits of his Robin Hoods and the cute send-ups of media feeding frenzy dull the film’s social criticism."

== See also ==
- Venezuelan banking crisis of 1994
