= Girder (comics) =

Publication information
- Publisher: DC Comics
- First appearance: Flash: Iron Heights (2001)
- Created by: Geoff Johns; Ethan Van Sciver

In-story information
- Alter ego: Tony Woodward
- Species: Human Cyborg
- Team affiliations: Secret Society of Super Villains; Rogues; Cyborg Revenge Squad; Legion of Zoom
- Notable aliases: Tony Steel, Anthony Polendina, Ironclad
- Abilities: Living metal body grants: Superhuman strength

Girder (Tony Woodward) is a supervillain and an enemy of the Flash (Wally West). He first appeared in Flash: Iron Heights (2001) and was created by Geoff Johns and Ethan Van Sciver.

Girder made his live-action debut on the first season of The Flash, portrayed by Greg Finley.

== Fictional character biography ==
Steelworker Tony Woodward caused a riot at a steel plant after he assaulted a female employee. Angry coworkers threw Woodward into a vat of molten steel. The liquid steel included recycled scraps from experiments performed by S.T.A.R. Labs, which turned Woodward's body into living metal. He possesses immense strength and durability, but rusts when exposed to oxygen. He is eventually arrested for robbery and sent to Iron Heights.

After escaping Iron Heights, Girder works with Blacksmith and her Rogues to take over Keystone City and Central City. While a member of the Rogues, Magenta uses her powers to keep Girder from rusting and Girder, having an "attraction", makes unwanted advances towards her. Magenta rips Girder in half, but he is welded back together and returned to Iron Heights.

During the "Infinite Crisis" storyline, Girder appears as a member of the Secret Society of Super Villains led by Alexander Luthor Jr. posing as Lex Luthor.

One Year Later, Girder is seen fighting the Teen Titans, but is defeated. He is later seen in Salvation Run.

In the DC Special: Cyborg mini-series, Girder joins the Cyborg Revenge Squad.

In 2016, DC Comics implemented a relaunch of its books called "DC Rebirth", which restored its continuity to a form much as it was prior to The New 52 reboot. Girder is among the villains invited by Eobard Thawne to join the Legion of Zoom.

== Powers and abilities ==
Girder has superhuman strength and endurance. His body is made of a durable steel that provides a high degree of protection from physical and energy attacks.

== In other media ==
=== Television ===
Tony Woodward appears in The Flash, portrayed by Greg Finley. This version was a childhood bully to Barry Allen and Iris West who became a metahuman with the ability to turn his skin into steel after falling into a vat of molten steel when the S.T.A.R. Labs particle accelerator exploded. In his most notable appearance in the episode "Power Outage", Allen has Woodward fight Farooq Gibran / Blackout while Allen is temporarily depowered, only for Woodward to be killed.

=== Film ===
Girder makes a non-speaking cameo appearance in Superman/Batman: Public Enemies.

=== Miscellaneous ===
- Girder appears in Justice League Unlimited #16.
- Girder appears in The Flash: The Fastest Man Alive #1.
