= Absentia (TV series) =

American thriller drama television series

- Genre: Drama; Thriller; Crime
- Created by: Gaia Violo; Matt Cirulnick
- Starring: Stana Katic; Matthew Le Nevez; Patrick Heusinger; Cara Theobold; Neil Jackson; Angel Bonanni; Bruno Bichir; Paul Freeman; Ralph Ineson; Patrick McAuley; Richard Brake; Donald McNair
- Composer: Nami Melumad
- Country of origin: United States
- Original language: English
- No. of seasons: 3
- No. of episodes: 30

Production
- Executive producers: Oded Ruskin; Stana Katic; Matt Cirulnick; Julie Glucksman; Maria Feldman; Tamir Kfir; Will Pascoe; Kasia Adamik; Sanford Golden; Karen Wyscarver
- Production location: Bulgaria
- Cinematography: Nadav Hekselman; Ziv Berkovich
- Running time: 42 minutes
- Production companies: Sony Pictures Television Networks Originals (seasons 1–2); Masha Productions (seasons 1–2); Media Brat Productions (season 3); Bizu Productions (season 3); Gemstone Studios (season 3); Sony Pictures Television Studios (Note: Credited as Sony Pictures Television in seasons 1–2.)

Original release
- Network: AXN (international, seasons 1–2); Amazon Prime Video (North America: seasons 1–2, worldwide: season 3)
- Release: September 25, 2017 – July 17, 2020

Absentia is an American thriller drama television series that premiered on September 25, 2017, on Amazon Prime Video in the United States and AXN internationally. Directed by Oded Ruskin, the series stars Stana Katic, Matthew Le Nevez and Patrick Heusinger. The series was renewed for a second season, premiering on March 26, 2019, on AXN, and premiered in the United States on June 14, 2019. The third season premiered on July 17, 2020 exclusively on Amazon Prime Video. In May 2021, the series was cancelled after three seasons.

== Premise ==
The series tells the story of FBI special agent Emily Byrne, who disappears without a trace while hunting one of Boston's most notorious serial killers, and is declared dead in absentia. Six years later, she is found in a cabin in the woods, barely alive and with no memory of the years that she was missing. She returns home to learn that her husband has remarried and her son is being raised by his new wife, and she soon finds herself implicated in a new series of murders.

== Cast and characters ==
=== Main ===
- Stana Katic as Special Agent Emily Byrne, a former FBI special agent who disappeared while hunting one of Boston's most notorious serial killers and was presumed dead, but returns six years later with no memory of her abduction. While struggling to rebuild her life and unravel the mystery of her disappearance, she becomes the prime suspect in a string of shocking new murders, and becomes a fugitive. Kalina Zaharieva plays a young Emily.
- Patrick Heusinger as Special Agent Nick Durand, Emily's husband and fellow FBI special agent who suffers with guilt that he stopped looking for Emily. He attempts to balance his life with Emily's return and his resurfacing feelings for her against his new marriage to Alice. After Emily goes on the run, his belief in her innocence crumbles and, after his family is endangered, he relentlessly hunts her down.
- Cara Theobold as Alice Durand (seasons 1–2; guest season 3), Nick's new wife and Flynn's stepmother. Alice attempts to remain graceful and kind, but her behavior towards Emily becomes increasingly harsh in the chaos after her return, believing that she is losing Nick's affection and that Emily is a danger to Flynn.
- Neil Jackson as Jack Byrne, Emily's older brother, a former surgeon who lost his job and medical license due to his alcohol addiction. In the first season, he is a medical supply salesman. In the second season, after getting his medical license back, he starts working as an EMT and a paramedic working towards being reinstated as a medical doctor.
- Angel Bonanni as Detective Tommy Gibbs (seasons 1–2), an ambitious and relentless Boston Police detective in charge of investigating Emily for murder, who later teams up with Nick to hunt Emily down.
- Bruno Bichir as Dr. Daniel Vega (season 1), an FBI psychologist and profiler, who works with Emily to heal her psychological wounds and find her abductor.
- Paul Freeman as Warren Byrne, a retired Boston Police officer and Emily's adoptive father.
- Ralph Ineson as Special Agent Adam Radford (season 1), the political and career-minded special agent in charge of the FBI's Boston field office, and Nick and Emily's boss. While he cares about Emily, he later coordinates a manhunt for her after she goes on the run.
- Christopher Colquhoun as Special Agent Derek Crown, an FBI special agent and colleague of Emily and Nick, who is later promoted to special agent in charge of the office after Radford's death. He is later demoted and replaced by Julianne Gunnarsen, but is re-promoted to the position near the end of the series after Gunnarsen is arrested for corruption and murder.
- Patrick McAuley as Flynn Durand, Emily's son with Nick, who has almost no memory of his mother and so is estranged and uncomfortable around her, although they gradually build a relationship.
- Matthew Le Nevez as Special Agent Cal Isaac (seasons 2–3), an FBI special agent and colleague of Emily and Nick, as well as a rugged former Navy SEAL, who becomes Emily's similarly haunted, loyal and empathetic counterpart.
- Natasha Little as Special Agent Julianne Gunnarsen (seasons 2–3), a new member of the Boston Field Office who is regarded as the FBI's best profiler, and joins the office after a lethal terrorist attack impacts Boston. She is later promoted to replace Crown as Special Agent in Charge of the office. She is eventually arrested near the end of the series for multiple acts of corruption, including Alice's murder, after her connection to an international crime ring is uncovered.

=== Recurring ===
- Lydia Leonard as Logan Brandt / Laurie Colson (season 1; guest season 2), a journalist investigating Emily.
- Richard Brake as Conrad Harlow (season 1), a reclusive wealthy banker and prime suspect in the serial killer case Emily was investigating before her disappearance. While the FBI was never able to make a case against Harlow as the serial killer, he is convicted of Emily's kidnapping and murder and sent to prison. Six years later, Emily's discovery results in his release.
- Hugh Quarshie as Dr. Semo Oduwale (season 2), Flynn's therapist and Alice's mentor.
- Geoff Bell as Colin Dawkins (season 3), a fixer working for an international crime syndicate to retrieve incriminating files by any means necessary.
- Josette Simon as Rowena Kincade (season 3), Emily's former FBI instructor.
- Ross O'Hennessy as Armstrong (season 3), Cal Isaac's former unit leader in Afghanistan

== Episodes ==
Season	Episodes	Originally released		
Season	Episodes	First released	Last released	Network
1	10	September 25, 2017	November 20, 2017	AXN
2	10	March 26, 2019	May 28, 2019	AXN
3	10	July 17, 2020		Amazon Prime Video

=== Season 1 (2017) ===
No. overall	No. in season	Title	Directed by	Written by	Original release date
1	1	"Comeback"	Oded Ruskin	Gaia Violo	September 25, 2017
The story begins with videos of the happy Durand family - Nick, an FBI Agent, his wife Emily, also an agent, and their son Flynn. Emily is kidnapped by someone and was presumed dead. The kidnapper, a known serial killer named Conrad Harlow, is tried for her murder and proven guilty. Six years later, Emily is seen trapped in a glass tank filling with water. Nick has a new wife, named Alice, and Flynn has grown up seeing Alice as his mother. Nick receives a phone call from Harlow giving him directions to where to find Emily. Nick races to the location with several FBI agents and finds Emily in the tank. She is in a malnourished and abused state with very little memory of what happened to her in captivity. She is devastated when she realizes Nick has married and that she has missed out on her son's childhood. Emily meets Flynn and Alice, which does not go well, leaving Nick with conflicted loyalties. Emily moves in with her brother Jack. With the help of a psychiatrist, Emily associates the events with names of flowers. Nick realizes one of Emily's earlier cases was of Robert Semerov, who was accused of trafficking girls and named his victims after flowers. Meanwhile, a decomposing body is found floating in the river and Tommy Gibbs from Boston police department starts to investigate. Nick and Emily visit a strip club where one of Semerov's girls, who is friends with Emily, leads them to Semerov’s location. The FBI reach the place where a shipment of girls is to arrive, hoping to catch Semerov. However, he is not there and in a fit of rage, Emily beats up another trafficker. Adam learns that the body in the river was Semerov's. Also, they find out that the DNA of the killer, which was under the nails of the body, belongs to Emily. Nick looks worried while Emily sits in the car unsure and confused.
2	2	"Reset"	Oded Ruskin	Matt Cirulnick	September 25, 2017
Conrad Harlow is released and he expresses concern for Emily. A woman, Kelly Price, meets Detective Gibbs and tells him she saw Emily arguing with Semerov two weeks ago on a bridge. Emily is struggling to regain her former self and has anxiety attacks. Alice appears troubled by Emily's return and the effect it has on her family. Boston PD, now working with the FBI, question Emily on suspicion of murder. Nick discovers Kelly Price is not who she claims to be, and that her real name is Regina. Her past associate, Cooper, tells them Regina worked for Semerov. Emily breaks into Harlow's house and confronts him but he denies kidnapping her. The police reach his house and arrest Emily for breaking in. Gibbs questions her again but lets her go. Nick tells Emily about the crooked agent. Emily is sure that the agent is also involved in her kidnapping, and they agree to hunt the agent down. Gibbs discovers Kelly Price has vanished as he receives a distress call about a murder. Harlow is found floating in his pool.
3	3	"The Emily Show"	Oded Ruskin	Elaina Perpelitt	October 2, 2017
Emily is in therapy and describes a bleeding eye, which she keeps seeing. Nick defends Emily to Gibbs and also tells him about the crooked agent. He asks for time to gather evidence and Gibbs relents. Emily takes Flynn go-karting but he loses control and has an accident. Alice blames Nick for letting Flynn go alone with Emily, but Nick brushes her off. Nick suspects Agent Crown to be involved with Semerov but Adam shuts him down. Nick and Emily break into Harlow's place and discover some footprints. Jack, overwhelmed by all the journalists and frustrated with all the attention surrounding Emily, breaks his sobriety. Jack and Emily fight over his drinking and she goes to stay in a motel. Gibbs uncovers CCTV footage showing Emily leaving Harlow's residence. However, she reveals to Nick that she was outside his home observing Alice and Flynn the night Harlow was murdered. Nick confronts Adam about Regina and Harlow's murder. Adam tells Nick he is blinded by Emily and gives him a warning. Emily is shown breaking into Adam's house where she discovers his diary. Inside are various drawings depicting a bleeding eye, matching the visions Emily has been having. As Adam arrives and searches his house suspiciously, Emily escapes, but it is shown Adam knows.
4	4	"Me You Him Me"	Oded Ruskin	Antoinette Stella	October 9, 2017
Adam knows Emily broke into his house. Emily convinces Nick about Adam, but he tells her that Boston police has issued a warrant for her. Alice doubts Emily's intentions more and more. Nick and Emily get intimate at her motel. However, when Nick is in the bathroom Emily escapes. Adam suspends Nick for helping Emily escape. Gibbs questions Emily's father, Warren, a former FBI agent too. Just then, Emily calls Warren for help and he motivates her to continue her journey. Emily kidnaps Adam and calls Nick. Nick is able to piece together where she has taken Adam. Adam confesses to Emily that he was involved with Semerov and Regina, but that he became obsessed with the bleeding eye during his pursuit to find her. Just as Nick and Gibbs find Adam, someone fires at them from the dark, killing Adam.
5	5	"Dig"	Oded Ruskin	Kate Powers	October 16, 2017
Emily pays her psychiatrist, Dr Vega, an unexpected visit to seek answers. He helps her trace her memory. Guided by Dr Vega, Emily discovers the bleeding eye is a tree where she used to play as a kid in the orphanage. Meanwhile, Agent Crown is temporarily in charge of the field office and ends Nick's suspension. Alice discovers she is pregnant but her relationship with Nick deteriorates as she guesses Nick slept with Emily and has feelings for her. Emily calls Nick and tells him that she did not kill Adam. Emily travels to an abandoned park called Nottingham Park and finds the tree with the bleeding eye pattern on it. She starts digging around the tree and is shocked to find a human skeleton. Meanwhile, Nick and Gibbs close in on her location and she has to flee the area. She travels to a truck stop and hides in the back of a truck just as the driver climbs on board and drives away. However, he suddenly stops the truck and points a shotgun at her.
6	6	"Nobody's Innocent"	Oded Ruskin	Matt Cirulnick	October 23, 2017
The driver knows who Emily is but hates cops, so he decides to help her and drives her back to Boston. The FBI investigates the identity of the skeleton. They discover that it has the Harlow signature of removing the eyelids of victims. Back in Boston, Emily breaks into Jack's house and hides a cellphone in his cereal box. She uses Jack's computer to trace the pacemaker's owner's identity and discovers some disturbing videos on his laptop. Nick interrogates a retired FBI agent and learns that Emily was the first and only person to question the witness who named Harlow as a suspect before she died. Emily tracks Jack meeting an escort at a bar. Gibbs searches Jack's house and sees the disturbing videos. The police also discover a number of large unexplained cash deposits in Jack's account. Gibbs questions the hospital Jack worked for and discovers he may have been embezzling from the hospital. Emily follows the escort back to the club she works at and secretly questions her. The escort tells her that Jack and she used to see each other but stopped when Emily was kidnapped. The bouncers of the club discover Emily in the dressing room, and she gets shot during her escape. The FBI is convinced that Emily is the one behind the murders and that she framed Harlow after they dig up six more bodies. Emily drives to her mother's grave, gravely injured and calls Jack on the cellphone she hides at his house. She asks him to meet her.
7	7	"A & B"	Oded Ruskin	Antoinette Stella	October 30, 2017
Jack takes Emily to a motel and is tending her wound. He denies any involvement with the murders. Jack traces the pacemaker to Dr Shen, who worked at Emily's old orphanage. Emily goes to Chinatown to talk to Shen's brother, Erik. He tells her that Shen was dismissed from MIT for his controversial work after which he joined the orphanage. Erik gives Emily access to all of Shen's research. Emily listens to some of his tapes and it's revealed that Shen conducted gruesome experiments on the children in the orphanage. Meanwhile, the police arrest Jack at an AA meeting. At the storage facility someone attacks Emily from behind. It is revealed that the two men are after the bounty on Emily. She escapes from their van as it stops at a red light and drives off after stealing a car. Emily goes back to the storage facility and retrieves Shen's tapes and hears the name Charles. She remembers attacking him at the orphanage when he teased her. Nick goes to meet Alice and Flynn and discovers that the house has been broken into.
8	8	"Brave Boy"	Oded Ruskin	Elaina Perpelitt	November 6, 2017
Nick believes Emily has kidnapped Alice and Flynn and he makes an emotional plea to her in front of the media. Emily has taken shelter in a homeless camp and is shaken after discovering Flynn has been abducted. With the help of her father and Jack, she finds Charles' location. Meanwhile, Alice and Flynn are trapped in a room and Flynn is tortured by their captor. The FBI are able to identify Shen's skeleton and trace his brother and his former employer to investigate further. The FBI is able to locate Charles so Nick and Gibbs set out to meet him. Emily arrives at the institution and is instantly recognized by Charles, who attacks her. Nick sees Emily running away from the hospital and gives chase. During a standoff, Emily shoots Nick and makes her escape.
9	9	"Child's Play"	Oded Ruskin	Kate Powers	November 13, 2017
Gibbs continues to chase Emily down but is unable to catch her as she escapes on a train. Alice regains consciousness but finds Flynn missing. On the train, Emily reads a book she stole from Charles and finds repeated drawings of a trident inside. Emily breaks into Erik Shen's restaurant and sees that the fish tank in the restaurant has the same trident symbol on it. Emily breaks into a hotel to use a computer but has to flee when she's recognized. She asks Jack to find out who ordered the tank in which she was tortured. Alice is able to escape from the room and free Flynn from the tank. They try to escape but Alice is shot with a dart by a masked person. Nick is told by Crown that Harlow was not in the country when some of the murders happened and that implies Harlow definitely had a partner. Nick and Gibbs meet Charles. He tells them about his friend who hurt Shen and that there was candy in the air where the children got hurt. This leads them to the place where a molasses storage tank exploded years ago. Jack tells Emily that the tank was ordered 7 years ago and that she was the one who ordered the tank. Emily, Nick and Gibbs all arrive at the factory. Emily finds a picture with a cabin in a wooded area on the wall of an abandoned building. Nick discovers that the shop on the opposite side of the street has the same masks as those used by the masked person Emily described. Later, Emily finds the cabin and discovers the hatch to a secret underground tunnel beneath the cabin. She calls Nick, asking him to come alone.
10	10	"Original Sin"	Oded Ruskin	Story by : Matthew Cirulnick and Gaia Violo; Teleplay by : Matthew Cirulnick	November 20, 2017
Inside the cabin tunnel, Emily has a panic attack and is shot with a dart by the masked person. She wakes up in a room with an unconscious Alice. The masked person talks to Emily through the TV screen and recounts her childhood at the orphanage where she eagerly awaited adoption. The masked person tells Emily that they became Shen's test subject because Emily switched her case file with someone else. The mask is taken off and the killer is revealed to be Laurie Colson, the investigative reporter, whose real name is Logan Brandt. Nick arrives and Alice takes them to where Flynn is. Emily drowns Laurie/Logan after being stabbed by her. Shortly thereafter, the FBI reach the cabin and Emily is arrested. Later, Crown holds a press conference announcing Emily's release and that Harlow and Laurie were responsible for all the murders. Nick is visited by Emily in the hospital. Days later, Emily celebrates Flynn's birthday. Emily notices water leaking in the kitchen and has another panic attack. As she sits on the floor mopping the water, she has a vision of Harlow floating dead in the water and sees herself in the water's reflection.

=== Season 2 (2019) ===
No. overall	No. in season	Title	Directed by	Written by	Original release date
11	1	"Casualties"	Oded Ruskin	Samantha Corbin-Miller	March 26, 2019
The season starts with a young man shooting someone multiple times. Emily is continuing her own investigation into Barrett house and Shen. Flynn is in therapy with Dr. Oduwale to get over his time in captivity. It is revealed that Alice has had a miscarriage. Jack has begun working as an EMT, and Emily and Tommy have begun a casual relationship. Tommy is helping Emily look for answers, giving her her original adoption file. There is a terrorist attack on a federal building and FBI HQ sends Agent Gunnarsen to Boston to help create a profile on the unsub. Flynn and Emily spend time together. As Emily is out buying groceries, she sees a hooded figure watching her. Tommy tracks down Mcnair and it's revealed that the hooded figure watching Emily earlier has several newspaper clippings of her in her camper. The woman reveals to Emily that she's her mother.
12	2	"Madness"	Oded Ruskin	Brendan Kelly	April 2, 2019
Emily doesn't trust Valerie's claim that she is her mother, but finds documented proof in her camper. Emily gets Valerie home and Valerie tells her that someone is following her. She also tells Emily that she gets injected periodically by someone and develops amnesia after that. Emily doesn't believe her and asks Valerie to leave. After Valerie collapses, its revealed that she's diabetic and Emily injects her with insulin. Emily decides to check on Valerie's story and goes to Boston Mercy hospital. Flynn comes to Emily's and is shocked to meet Valerie, who blurts out that she is his grandmother. Emily asks Valerie to leave and later she gets attacked and injected by a hooded figure.
13	3	"Guilty"	Oded Ruskin	Logan Slakter	April 9, 2019
Tommy informs Emily about Valerie's death. The FBI is successful in narrowing down the suspect based on a tool left behind during the attack. Tommy finds out the drug used to kill Valerie was Fentanyl. Flynn displays strong aggression towards another kid during a group therapy session. Emily decides to rejoin the Bureau in order to investigate the fentanyl poisoning cases. Tommy is heartbroken when he learns Emily has rejoined FBI and no longer needs him. Jack is reprimanded for performing a lifesaving tracheostomy on a patient because he was not authorized to do so, leaving him dejected. CCTV footage leads Gunnarsen to the perpetrator being a member of a group called 'Patriotic Guardians'. Nick and Gunnarsen track the terrorist suspect to his parents' house, but he has already escaped.
14	4	"Offenders"	Oded Ruskin	Milla Bell-Hart	April 16, 2019
Tyler attacks a man and his daughter at their cabin, killing the man. Crown is shown to be involved with Erica Lyle, a reporter. Gunnarsen finds letters to Tyler from a woman called Liza Tutee, an admirer of his. Emily and Cal try to connect the various murders done using fentanyl, the latest one being of Congressman Eli Ramos. They notice that the victims develop a peculiar rash. Emily reconciles with Tommy, and he confesses his love for her. Emily and Cal are puzzled by another murder, this time the target being Clay Bishop, a first ballot Hall of Famer. They are able to collect a blood sample from his dog's mouth that may be the killer's. Nick plants a tracking device in Liza's car, and they follow her to Tyler's location. The FBI captures Tyler and Nick is applauded for his work. Gunnarsen is now assigned to work with Emily and Cal. Tommy discovers Emily has been drugging herself with sodium pentothal in order to retrieve her lost memories, but she refuses his affection which leads to a violent confrontation between the two.
15	5	"Bolo"	Adam Sanderson	Julia Cooperman	April 23, 2019
Tommy has stopped responding to Emily's calls. Emily and Cal question the latest victim's wife. She tells them he demonstrated sudden explosive anger and memory loss attributed to CTE. Alice and Jack get closer. Flynn and Warren are playing games at an arcade when Warren suddenly collapses and is admitted to hospital. Alice, Nick and Flynn are joined by Emily, Warren and Jack for a family dinner, but Emily leaves midway after an argument. Cal and Emily find the DNA match for the murderer who turns out to be Rex Wolfe, a former soldier. On the way to the courthouse, Rex, who has impersonated an FBI agent, attacks and kills Tyler with a fentanyl injection. Nick chases Rex after he jumps out of the transport van, but Rex is still able to escape. Crown dispatches Cal and Emily to Moldova to capture Rex.
16	6	"Cover"	Adam Sanderson	Samantha Corbin-Miller	April 30, 2019
Crown creates a story to cover up that Rex Wolfe killed Tyler. Emily disguises herself as a wealthy businesswoman and Cal as her bodyguard in Moldova. Alice is told that she will never be able to conceive another child. Emily and Cal learn that a private military company Nightwatch employs Rex Wolfe. The company tracks and monitors its members 24/7 by a tracking chip embedded in the arm. Emily meets and seduces one of their members and has to forcibly remove his embedded chip when he attacks her. Emily and Cal break into Nightwatch and are able to locate Rex. But just as they're making their escape Jacques and his men capture them. They are able to escape through a storm drain but are recaptured later. Meanwhile, news reporter Erica Lyle tells Crown she knows that Tyler's death was fishy and that the FBI is hiding something. In order to kill her suspicions he promises her an exclusive with Nick. Nick is worried that Emily has missed her scheduled check-in. Alice visits Dr. Oduwale for help regarding her deteriorating relationship with Nick.
17	7	"Boom"	Adam Sanderson	Brendan Kelly	May 7, 2019
Emily and Cal are being held captive and driven in a van. Tommy decides to investigate Catalyst Diagnostics and finds some incriminating evidence in their lab. However, he is suspended from the police force, as he broke into their labs illegally, without a warrant. Emily and Cal are rescued by Holt, and he takes them to his house. Nick's interview with Erica goes as planned but he feels guilty about lying. Emily meets Oksana, a Russian sniper, and admires her. Emily, Cal and Holt reach Rex's house and engage in crossfire with him. He stabs Holt during his escape and runs into a minefield, stepping on a live mine. Emily follows him despite Cal's warning and demands answers. He tells Emily he was just following orders to kill those people and that Emily should look for answers in her own backyard. He steps off the mine and is blown to pieces. Emily and Cal rush Holt to Oksana but he dies from his wounds. Emily returns to the States and Nick informs her that Tommy committed suicide by carbon monoxide poisoning in his car. Meanwhile, Alice begins an affair with Jack.
18	8	"Aggression"	Kasia Adamik	Logan Slakter	May 14, 2019
Emily learns Tommy was suspended from work after he was caught snooping around Catalyst Diagnostics. Crown wants to close the case after Rex's death, but Cal insists on continuing. Emily convinces Cal to look into Catalyst Diagnostics as Tommy found something which led to his death. Nick decides to spend more time with his family, but Alice appears distant. Emily searches for clues in Tommy's car and finds the word 'Quill' scribbled on the car window. Nick and Alice have a heart-to-heart discussion. Cal finds out that Quill is a research project which has been discontinued. They contact Ulf Maston, the professor in charge of Quill. Ulf tells Emily that the Quill project was designed to help people cope with stressful situations and help them develop resilience, through the use of a serum. But the results were unexpected as the rats, which acted as the subjects, started showing unexplained aggression and violence and the project was shut down. Emily also learns that behavioral psychologist, Lu Fang Shen worked on the project. Emily walks away from Cal and Maston and starts having a panic attack. After calming herself, she is shocked to see a picture of Dr. Oduwale, Flynn's therapist on the wall.
19	9	"Committed"	Kasia Adamik	Milla Bell-Hart	May 21, 2019
Emily instructs Nick to keep Flynn away from Dr. Oduwale after she discovers his role in Quill. She goes to interrogate Oduwale and notices he has the same painting on his wall that Rex Wolfe had in his home in Moldova. They learn that Oduwale counsels soldiers at the same base that Rex was stationed, and he was Tyler's therapist and gave him an experimental drug. Alice ends things with Jack which leaves him heartbroken. Oduwale is brought in for questioning by Gunnarsen and Cal, which allows Nick time to search his office, finding that all his files have been removed. Meanwhile, Emily goes to Oduwale's house and forces a confession from him by threatening him with poison. Oduwale makes a shocking confession to Emily. Nick and Cal reach Oduwale's house but the three are drawn from the house when Cal's car explodes leaving Oduwale alone inside. It serves as a distraction as Oduwale is shot by someone.
20	10	"Accomplice"	Kasia Adamik	Julia Cooperman	May 28, 2019
Dr. Oduwale dies from his injuries. Jack calls Alice and tells her he won't let her go so easily. Gunnarson is promoted to head of the Boston field office, replacing Crown. Emily and Cal get a closer look at Oduwale's phone records and emails. Alice suggests a family camping trip to Nick but leaves suddenly claiming she is unwell. Emily discovers that Oduwale had access to Flynn's blood samples for years. Emily deduces that Alice was Oduwale's accomplice. Emily is able to track Alice down and confronts her. Alice claims she never knew the true purpose of the research and that she eventually truly started loving Flynn and Nick. Alice killed Oduwale when she realized what he did to Emily and the others. She begs Emily to let her go as she won't be able to face Flynn and Nick. Emily is about to let Alice escape when Gunnarsen shoots Alice and she dies. Emily is shown giving the news to Nick and Flynn.

=== Season 3 (2020) ===
No. overall	No. in season	Title	Directed by	Written by	Original release date
21	1	"Tabula Rasa"	Kasia Adamik	Will Pascoe	July 17, 2020
Emily, Nick, and Flynn are still dealing with the effects of Alice's death. Emily learns of Alice and Jack's affair. Emily believes that Gunnarsen is hiding something and shot Alice to cover her tracks and has been conducting surveillance on her. Nick has been investigating a series of murders, all involving homeless people who are found dead and missing organs. His informant, Kai, tips him and Emily off to where the organization have been doing the surgeries. Later that night, Nick is attacked at home and kidnapped. When Emily returns home to look for him she gets into a fight with one of the assailants and is stabbed.
22	2	"Capta Est"	Kasia Adamik	Karen Wyscarver & Sanford Golden	July 17, 2020
Cal finds Emily and drives her to the hospital. Jack wants her to rest, but she refuses, wanting to look for Nick. She finds Kai, who directs her to the location of the guy who stabbed her. She forces him to take her to where Nick is being kept. Meanwhile, Nick's captors beat and question him about Kai's whereabouts. By the time Emily gets to his location, Nick is moved to another location. Cal learns that the organ harvesting case is tied to something from his past, an international crime syndicate called Meridian. The FBI tracks down the owner of the car who was transporting Nick, but as they arrive to the car's location, a bomb goes off. In the ashes, Emily finds Nick's badge.
23	3	"Nosce Inimicum"	Kasia Adamik	Katrina Cabrera Ortega	July 17, 2020
Gunnarsen believes Nick may be dead, but Emily refuses to believe this. Nick wakes up naked and locked in a white room, in a hallway with dozens of others just like him. Emily orders Kristoff to tell Dawkins that she will trade Kai and the stolen files for Nick's life. Kristoff gives Dawkins the information and is then murdered by Dawkins. Emily and the FBI arrange Emily's meeting with Dawkins, while Kai tags his phone to find Nick's location. Kai learns Nick is in Europe on an island. Emily offers the files that contain compromising information about prominent figures to Dawkins, who lets her know he's aware Kai is there. To save Kai, she has to let him go. Cal and the FBI chase Dawkins, but lose him. Dawkins' associate attempts to murder Kai, and throws her down two stories at the mall meeting.
24	4	"Alea Iacta Est"	Kasia Adamik	Kristy Lowrey	July 17, 2020
Kai dies on the way to the hospital but gives Emily the files. When Gunnarsen tries to lecture Emily about running the investigation, Emily accuses her of intentionally murdering Alice, punches her, then quits the FBI. Cal is intrigued by the Meridian files, which date back to his past. He and Emily learn that Nick was shipped overseas through Jericho. Dawkins threatens Flynn and attempts to kidnap him. In response, Emily has Warren take him out of town. She later tips off Dawkins that the FBI have found his location and proposes they meet to make a deal. Nick is questioned about the files, but he refuses to give any information.
25	5	"Quid Pro Quo"	Kasia Adamik	Joanne Kelly	July 17, 2020
Emily has an old friend, Rowena, kidnap her from Dawkins' grasp. Crown shares with Cal that there is a mole in the FBI working for Meridian. Cal travels to Europe to look for Emily and Nick, using his off the book contact to gather information. Nick is heavily drugged and has visions of Alice, Emily and Flynn. Rowena gives Emily the location of a local gathering she must infiltrate to find Dawkins and the file decryption key. She learns that Jericho has been shipping medical supplies to Austria. Emily and Cal reunite in Europe to find Nick.
26	6	"In Quo Ego Vado Vos"	Kasia Adamik	Katrina Cabrera Ortega	July 17, 2020
Crown begins investigating Gunnarsen and looks into her finances. Gunnarsen finds out and suggest they work together to find the mole. Emily and Cal board a train to get to Nick's location. Cal checks in with Gunnarsen but hides the fact that he has made contact with Emily. Flynn and Warren make it safely to the farmhouse. Cal shares with Emily that when he was a soldier for Meridian, he was forced to murder a teenager in order to save his friend's life. Later the two have sex. They arrive at Nick's location but find that all the captives have been moved. Emily recognizes that the pictures on the wall in the lab belong to the murdered homeless people.
27	7	"Liberavit"	Greg Zglinski	Karen Wyscarver & Sanford Golden	July 17, 2020
Emily and Cal learn Jericho is a person and the man behind Meridian. Gunnarsen is taken off Nick's case. Nick temporarily escapes his captors and is aided by some Syrian children who are looking for their parents. Nick calls Boston FBI field office and Thompson answers the phone. He is able to give her his location but as soon as the call ends she is approached by an unknown. Cal learns Armstrong is working with Meridian and Emily notices he shares the same tattoo as Meridian's people. Not trusting him, they part ways. Meanwhile, Thompson is found murdered leaving Crown and Gunnersen anxious. Emily tracks down Nick and rescues him.
28	8	"Veritas Aequitas"	Greg Zglinski	Will Pascoe	July 17, 2020
Emily and Nick call for the FBI to send an extraction team to save the refugees who are at Meridian's headquarters. Crown and Gunnarsen think that deputy director Webb may be the mole. Flynn becomes worried that Warren is sick and calls Jack. Jericho is revealed to be the man who Emily confronted at the party. Emily and Nick break into Meridian's headquarters to free the refugees. Meanwhile, Jack shows up to the farmhouse but is followed. Warren is knocked out and captured by Dawkins. Emily confronts Jericho and is shocked to see Cal behind him before she is knocked out.
29	9	"Tenebris"	Greg Zglinski	Kristy Lowrey	July 17, 2020
Emily is interrogated and tortured by Jericho who wants the files, but she refuses to give them to him. Crown and Gunnarsen find incriminating evidence against the FBI Director but when they go to arrest him, he has committed suicide leaving Thompson's files on his desk. Jericho tells Emily that they used people to test medical products on. Nick helps the refugees escape while Cal kills Armstrong. Jack helps Flynn escape Dawkins and is shot. Flynn shoots Dawkins with his bow and leads him to an abandoned well where he falls to his death. Emily escapes capture and kills Jericho with his own bioweapon. As he dies, he tells Emily that "she" already has the bioweapon.
30	10	"Iterum Nata"	Greg Zglinski	Joanne Kelly & Will Pascoe	July 17, 2020
Emily, Cal, and Nick return home to the states. Emily figures out that Brigitte Kerlan the CEO of Kerlan Pharmaceuticals is the one who has the bioweapon. Crown doesn't believe that they caught the FBI mole and asks Emily to track down the Meridian files and plant them at the agency. When Kerlan Enterprises threatens Flynn and Nick, Emily is forced to fake their deaths and they go into hiding. Emily and Cal plant evidence at Kerlan Enterprises; the bioweapon is seized, and Brigitte is arrested. Gunnarsen is revealed to be the mole and agent Thompson's killer. Six months later, Emily is living abroad in Warsaw, Poland and is visited by Cal.

== Production ==
Production was completed in Bulgaria on the ten-episode series, with every episode directed by Oded Ruskin. The entire first season was shot together, as though it were one long movie.

== Release ==
The world premiere of Absentia was the opening selection at the 57th Monte Carlo Television Festival in June 2017. Absentia was a featured panel at Sony Pictures Television for the annual TV Market.

In Canada, Absentia was shown on Showcase in early 2018. In the United States, the series was picked up by Amazon and was released on Amazon Video on February 2, 2018. It was released on Amazon Video in the United Kingdom and Australia. The series was released in Sweden, Norway and Denmark on Viaplay December 5, 2017.

== Reception ==
On review aggregator Rotten Tomatoes, the first season holds an approval rating of 50% based on 16 reviews. The website's critical consensus reads, "Absentia sticks too closely to the procedural handbook, leaving its capable lead and mildly intriguing mystery treading water." On Metacritic, it has a weighted average score of 59 out of 100, based on the opinions of four critics, indicating "mixed or average reviews".
