= Inside Man (2023 film) =

Film by Danny A. Abeckaser

- Theatrical release poster
- Directed by: Danny A. Abeckaser
- Written by: Kosta Kondilopoulos
- Produced by: Danny A. Abeckaser; Kyle Stefanski; Gustavo Nascimento; Jon Brewer
- Starring: Emile Hirsch; Jake Cannavale; Lucy Hale; Ashley Greene; Danny A. Abeckaser; Vincent Laresca; Kyle Stefanski; James Russo; Robert Davi
- Cinematography: Bryan Koss
- Edited by: Steven Ansell
- Music by: Lionel Cohen
- Production companies: 2B Films; Wild7 Films
- Distributed by: Vertical Entertainment
- Release date: August 11, 2023
- Running time: 87 minutes
- Country: United States
- Language: English

Inside Man is a 2023 American independent crime thriller film directed by Danny A. Abeckaser and written by Kosta Kondilopoulos. It stars Emile Hirsch, Jake Cannavale, Lucy Hale, Ashley Greene, Abeckaser, Vincent Laresca, Kyle Stefanski, James Russo and Robert Davi.

== Plot ==
Detective Bobby Belucci, once respected, finds himself in disgrace after a tumultuous confrontation with his wife's lover. This incident results in his demotion, leaving him grappling with both his personal turmoil and the loss of his professional standing. In a bid to reclaim his integrity and purpose, Bobby resolves to infiltrate the notorious Gambino crime family in New York, specifically targeting the menacing DeMeo Crew under the leadership of Roy DeMeo.

== Cast ==
- Emile Hirsch as Bobby Belucci
- Greg Finley as Anthony Senter
- Lucy Hale as Gina
- Ashley Greene as Mary Belucci
- Danny A. Abeckaser as Roy DeMeo
- Vincent Laresca as James Curtis
- Jake Cannavale as Chris Rosenberg
- Robert Davi as Anthony 'Nino' Gaggi
- Bo Dietl as Captain Rick Callan
- Sid Rosenberg as Joseph "Dracula" Guglielmo
- Jeremy Luke as Louis Russo
- James Russo as Garo Balikian
- Kyle Stefanski as Freddie DiNome
- George Andreakos as Luca Santi
- Darren Weiss as Mick

== Production ==
In March 2022, it was announced that Emile Hirsch, Lucy Hale, Ashley Greene and Greg Finley would star in the film.

Principal photography began in March 2022 in Los Angeles and New York.

== Release ==
In February 2023, Vertical Entertainment purchased the North American rights to the film, then titled The Gemini Lounge, after the name of a bar in Brooklyn, which was frequented by the mob.

The film was released in theaters and on demand on August 11, 2023.

== Reception ==
Andrew Stover of Film Threat scored the film a 7 out of 10.

Leslie Felperin of The Guardian awarded the film two stars out of five.
