= Nick Cordero =

Canadian actor and singer (1978–2020)

- Cordero in 2014
- Born: Nicholas Eduardo Alberto Cordero; September 17, 1978; Hamilton, Ontario, Canada
- Died: July 5, 2020 (aged 41); Los Angeles, California, U.S.
- Cause of death: COVID-19
- Education: Ryerson University
- Occupations: Actor; singer
- Years active: 2005–2020
- Spouse: Amanda Kloots (m. 2017)
- Children: 1

Nicholas Eduardo Alberto Cordero (September 17, 1978 – July 5, 2020) was a Canadian actor and singer. He was nominated for the Tony Award for Best Featured Actor in a Musical for his role as Cheech in the 2014 Broadway musical Bullets Over Broadway and was twice nominated for Drama Desk Awards. His career also included television and film roles.

Cordero died at age 41 from COVID-19-related complications after more than three months in the hospital.

== Early life ==
Cordero was born and raised in Hamilton, Ontario, to a Canadian mother and a father from Costa Rica. He graduated from Westdale Secondary School in Hamilton and attended Ryerson University in Toronto for two years before dropping out to perform in the band Lovemethod.

== Career ==
Cordero's acting debut was in the title role in the off-Broadway production of The Toxic Avenger. He also played the role of Dennis in Rock of Ages on Broadway in 2012 and on tour. Cordero appeared on Broadway in 2014 in the musical Bullets Over Broadway in the role of Cheech, for which he was nominated for the Tony Award for Best Featured Actor in a Musical and the Drama Desk Award for Outstanding Featured Actor in a Musical. He won the Outer Critics Circle Award for Outstanding Featured Actor in a Musical and a Theatre World Award for the role.

In March 2016, Cordero joined the Broadway production of Waitress, playing the role of Earl. He left Waitress to join the Broadway premiere of the musical A Bronx Tale, playing Sonny at the Longacre Theatre starting on November 3, 2016. For this role, Cordero was nominated for the Drama Desk Award for Outstanding Featured Actor in a Musical in 2017. Also in 2017, he portrayed Victor Lugo in "Out of the Blue" and "Heavy Is the Head", the fourth and tenth episodes of the eighth season of the CBS police procedural drama Blue Bloods. He reprised the role in 2018 in "Your Six", the twentieth episode of the eighth season of the show. In March 2020 Cordero moved to Los Angeles to work in a production of Rock of Ages.

== Personal life ==
On September 3, 2017, Cordero married dancer Amanda Kloots in a formal ceremony. Their son was born on June 10, 2019.

=== Illness and death ===
Cordero was initially diagnosed with pneumonia while staying with his wife and son at the guest house of former Bullets Over Broadway co-star Zach Braff. He was admitted to a hospital on March 30, 2020, where he was later diagnosed with COVID-19 during the pandemic in Los Angeles. He was initially offered hydroxychloroquine. Due to his worsening condition, his doctors put him in a medically-induced coma and placed him on a ventilator, and treated him with dialysis and extracorporeal membrane oxygenation (ECMO). He was also enrolled into the clinical trial for the antiviral drug remdesivir, which was taking place at Cedars-Sinai Medical Center.

On April 18, 2020, his right leg was amputated due to a blood clot as a result of complications from his illness. By May 1, 2020, he had major lung damage including "holes in his lungs" and lung scarring. A tracheostomy tube was inserted to help him breathe.

On July 5, 2020, after 95 days in the hospital, Cordero died at Cedars-Sinai Medical Center in Los Angeles, at age 41. His body was cremated.

== Legacy ==
On July 7, 2020, an effort was launched to rename the Longacre Theatre in Manhattan after Cordero. On September 2, 2021, the Broadway production of Waitress paid tribute to Cordero, with Kloots and the show's cast performing his single "Live Your Life". Additionally, the "Live Your Life Pie" has become a permanent part of the show's set and script. A film of a rooftop performance of a song from Bullets Over Broadway is dedicated to his memory, commemorating his portrayal of Cheech.

On September 2, 2020, American singer-songwriter Finneas released the song "What They'll Say About Us", which was partly inspired by Cordero's death.

Before the end credits of Blue Bloods Season 11, Episode 3 (Atonement), he was memorialised with the screen reading "In Memory of NICK CORDERO"

On November 8, 2021, the first 'Nick Cordero Award' scholarship was awarded at Toronto Metropolitan University. The fundraising efforts of his former classmates and friends enabled this award to be given in perpetuity.

== Filmography ==
=== Film ===
Year	Title	Role	Notes	Ref
2007	Apartments at 254	John	Short	
2011	Don Juan	Don Juan		
2016	A Stand Up Guy	Sal		
2017	Going in Style	Butcher		
2019	Inside Game	Pete Ruggieri		
2019	Mob Town	Vincent Gigante		

=== Television ===
Year	Title	Role	Notes Notes	Ref
2005	Queer as Folk	Tuna Wrap	1 episode	
2014	Lilyhammer	Pasquale 'Patsy' Lento	1 episode	
2014	The Broadway.com Show	Himself	5 episodes	
2015	The Talk	Himself	1 episode	
2015	68th Tony Awards	Himself	Performer	
2017	Side by Side by Susan Blackwell	Himself	1 episode; web series	
2017–2018	Blue Bloods	Victor Lugo	3 episodes	
2015, 2019	Law & Order: Special Victims Unit	Anthony Marino / Robby Marino	2 episodes	

=== Theatre ===
Year	Title	Role	Notes
2007	Blood Brothers	Sammy	Hamilton's Theatre Aquarius
2009	The Toxic Avenger	Melvin Ferd III/The Toxic Avenger	Off-Broadway
2012	Rock of Ages	Dennis/Record Company Man	Broadway
2014	Bullets Over Broadway	Cheech	Broadway
2015	Brooklynite	Avenging Angelo	Off-Broadway
2016	Waitress	Earl Hunterson	Broadway
2016–18	A Bronx Tale	Sonny	Broadway
2018	Little Shop of Horrors	Orin Scrivello	Kennedy Center

== Awards and nominations ==
Year	Award	Category	Nominated work	Result	Ref.
2014	Theatre World Award	Outstanding Debut Performance	Bullets Over Broadway	Won	
2014	Outer Critics Circle Award	Outstanding Featured Actor in a Musical	Bullets Over Broadway	Won	
2014	Drama League Award	Distinguished Performance	Bullets Over Broadway	Nominated	
2014	Drama Desk Award	Outstanding Featured Actor in a Musical	Bullets Over Broadway	Nominated	
2014	Tony Awards	Best Featured Actor in a Musical	Bullets Over Broadway	Nominated	
2017	Outer Critics Circle Award	Outstanding Actor in a Musical	A Bronx Tale	Nominated	
2017	Drama Desk Award	Outstanding Actor in a Musical	A Bronx Tale	Nominated	
