= The Perfect Gamble =

- Theatrical release poster
- Directed by: Danny A. Abeckaser
- Written by: Kosta Kondilopoulos
- Produced by: Danny A. Abeckaser; Rinati Rokach; Yoav Gross
- Starring: David Arquette; Daniella Pick Tarantino; Danny A. Abeckaser
- Cinematography: Barry Markowitz
- Edited by: Steve Ansell; Eric Chase
- Music by: Lionel Cohen
- Production companies: 2B Films; Yoav Gross Productions
- Distributed by: Saban Films
- Release date: November 14, 2025
- Running time: 82 minutes
- Country: United States
- Language: English

The Perfect Gamble is a 2025 American crime drama film written by Kosta Kondilopoulos, directed by Danny A. Abeckaser and starring David Arquette, Daniella Pick Tarantino and Abeckaser.

The film was released in the United States on November 14, 2025 by Saban Films.

== Cast ==
- David Arquette as Charlie
- Daniella Pick Tarantino as Sonia
- Danny A. Abeckaser as Felix
- Dean Miroshnikov as Victor
- Eli Danker as Dimitri
- Herzl Tobey as Peter
- Hadar Shitrit as Cynthia

== Production ==
In May 2024, it was announced that Arquette, Abeckaser and Tarantino were cast in the film.

In September 2024, it was announced that production had been completed and that Saban Films acquired distribution rights to the film, which was shot in Israel and Georgia.

== Release ==
The Perfect Gamble was released on November 14, 2025 by Saban Films.

== Reception ==
Alan Ng of Film Threat scored the film an 8 out of 10.
