= Daniella Pick =

Israeli singer and model-actress (born 1983)

- דניאלה פיק
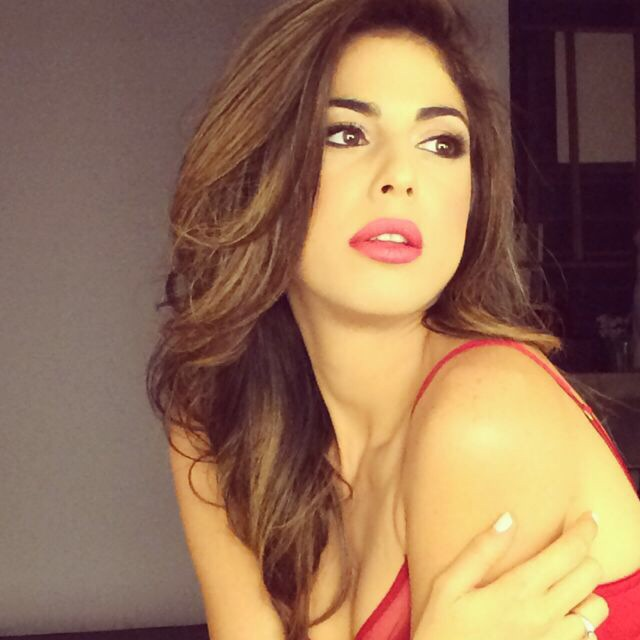
- Pick in 2015
- Born: 21 November 1983 (age 42); Ramat HaSharon, Israel
- Occupations: Singer; model; actress
- Spouse: Quentin Tarantino (m. 2018)
- Children: 2
- Parents: Svika Pick (father); Mirit Shem-Ur (mother)

Daniella Pick (Hebrew: דניאלה פיק; born 21 November 1983) is an Israeli singer, model, and actress. She is married to American filmmaker Quentin Tarantino.

== Early life ==
Pick was born in Ramat Ha-Sharon, Israel, the daughter of singer-songwriter and composer Svika Pick. Her parents divorced when she was a child. Pick has one sister, Sharona, and an older brother. Pick has said in interviews that she sang before she began speaking and dreamed of becoming a singer from a young age.

== Career ==
Pick began her singing career with her sister Sharona in the duo The Pick Sisters in the early 2000s. The duo placed joint eleventh in Kdam Eurovision 2005 with the single "Hello Hello". The following year, the duo split up and Pick has since pursued a solo career. In 2009, Pick made her debut with the album Sometimes Dreams Come True. Her musical style is influenced by Adele and Amy Winehouse. In addition to her career as a singer, Daniella Pick has worked as a model. Her photos have appeared on covers for several Israeli magazines, including the daily newspaper Yedi'ot Aharonot. In the film Once Upon a Time...in Hollywood, she had a supporting role as the fictional actress Daphna Ben-Cobo.

Her single Far was the theme song on the series Pick Up distributed by Channel 10 in 2005.

In 2007, Pick participated in the third season of Rokdim Im Kokhavim, the Israeli version of Dancing with the Stars.

In 2009, she appeared on Big Brother VIP season 1 with her sister Sharona.

Pick was cast in the film The Perfect Gamble, which was released in 2025.

In 2025, Pick was cast in Frequency of Fear alongside Doron Ben-David, Itzik Cohen and Ángel Bonanni. The film is based on a covert Israeli operation in 2024 in Lebanon, using thousands of pagers and walkie-talkies to assassinate Hezbollah operatives.

== Personal life ==
On 28 November 2018, she married Quentin Tarantino, her partner since 2017. They met while Tarantino was in Israel promoting his film Inglourious Basterds in 2009. They have two children, a son, Leo, born in 2020 and a daughter, Adriana, born in 2022.

They reside in the Ramat Aviv Gimel neighbourhood in Tel Aviv.

At the 2025 Cannes Film Festival, Pick wore a yellow ribbon to raise awareness about the remaining Israeli hostages being held by Hamas.

== Discography ==
=== Singles ===
- 2004: This Song (with Sharona Pick)
- 2004: The Rain Again (with Sharona Pick)
- 2005: Hello Hello (with Sharona Pick)
- 2006: No One
- 2007: This Song (with Svika Pick)
- 2011: Yalla Yalla
- 2016: Hayu Leilot
