= Greg Finley =

American actor (born 1984)

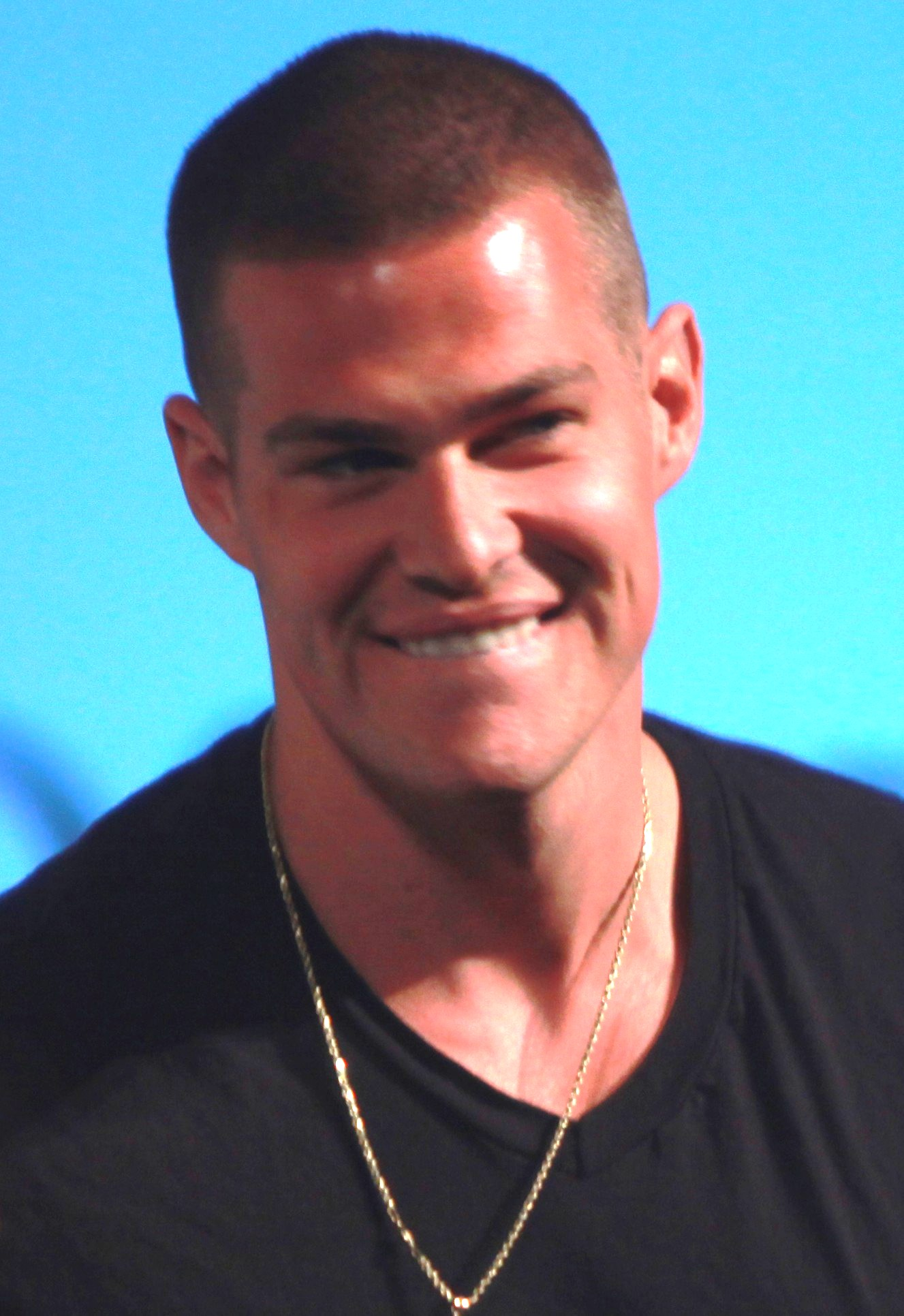
- Finley at the 2014 WonderCon
- Born: Gregory Finley; December 22, 1984 (age 41); Portland, Maine, U.S.
- Occupation: Actor
- Years active: 2007–present

Gregory Finley (born December 22, 1984) is an American actor, known for his role as Jack Pappas in the teenage drama series The Secret Life of the American Teenager as well as Drake in the series Star Crossed and iZombie, and Girder in The Flash.

== Career ==
Greg Finley is best known for his role as Jack Pappas, on The Secret Life Of The American Teenager. In February 2010, Finley was cast in the Dark Sky Films thriller Hypothermia, directed by James Felix McKenney.

== Personal life ==
Finley was raised in Scarborough, Maine, a coastal town seven miles south of Portland. His father is part-owner of the Dry Dock pub and restaurant on Portland's waterfront. After high school, Finley enrolled in a restaurant management program at Johnson & Wales University in Rhode Island, but his academics suffered due to a large abscess in his throat. Finley required emergency treatment and lost about 60 pounds in the process. In order to cope, Finley watched movies and tv shows, and decided to become an actor. At age 19, Finley moved to Los Angeles.

== Filmography ==
=== Film ===
Film roles
Year	Title	Role	Notes
2007	Graduation Day	Ben Chase	Short film
2012	Hypothermia	Stevie Cote, Jr.	
2018	The Witch Files	Mr. Dwyer	
2020	Blackjack: The Jackie Ryan Story	Jack Ryan	
2021	Downeast	Tommy	
2021	I Love Us	Rob Fenton	
2023	Inside Man	Anthony Senter	

=== Television ===
Television roles
Year	Title	Role	Notes
2007	CSI: Crime Scene Investigation	Office assistant	Episode: "Snakes"
2007	Cold Case	Grant Hall	Episode: "Shuffle, Ball Change"
2008–13	The Secret Life of the American Teenager	Jack Pappas	Series regular
2012	House	Bobby Hatcher	Episode: "Gut Check"
2013	Emily Owens, M.D.	Dan	Episode: "Emily and... the Perfect Storm"
2013	Necessary Roughness	Joe Crabchek	Episode: "The Game's Afoot"
2014	Star-Crossed	Drake	Series regular
2014	Law & Order: Special Victims Unit	Eddie Thorpe	Episode: "Gridiron Soldier"
2014	The Flash	Tony Woodward / Girder	2 episodes
2015	CSI: Crime Scene Investigation	Scott Hunt / Male superhero	Episode: "Hero to Zero"
2015–17	iZombie	Drake Holloway	9 episodes
2016	The Flash	Tony Woodward / Girder	3 episodes
2018	Chicago P.D.	Trent Stow	Episode: "Ride Along"
2019	Wasted	Professor Collins	TV movie
2020	Agents of S.H.I.E.L.D.	Tillman	Episode: "The New Deal"
2023	NCIS: Hawaiʻi	MSgt. Justin Baxter	Episode: "Shields Up"
2025	Chicago Fire	Paramedic Scott "Oz" Osbourne	Episode: "Bar Time"
