= Emile Hirsch =

American actor (born 1985)

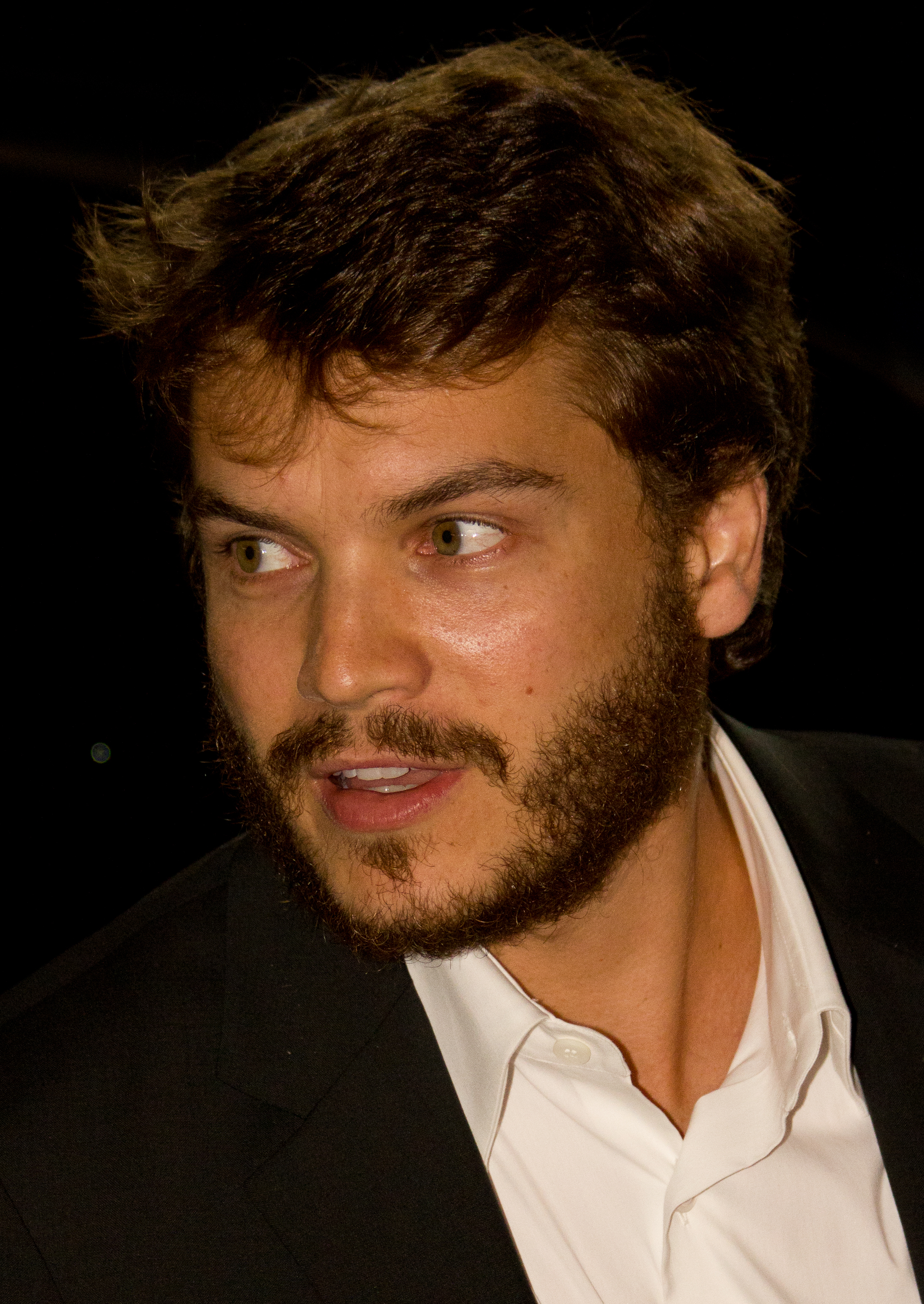
- Hirsch in 2012
- Born: Emile Davenport Hirsch; March 13, 1985 (age 41); Los Angeles, California, U.S.
- Occupation: Actor
- Years active: 1996–present
- Children: 1

Emile Davenport Hirsch (born March 13, 1985) is an American actor. His portrayal of Chris McCandless in Into the Wild (2007) earned him acclaim and multiple award nominations.

Other notable roles include The Girl Next Door (2004), Lords of Dogtown (2005), Alpha Dog (2006), Speed Racer (2008), Milk (2008), Lone Survivor (2013), The Autopsy of Jane Doe (2016), The Chinese Widow (2017), An Evening with Beverly Luff Linn (2018), Freaks (2018), Once Upon a Time in Hollywood (2019), and Woozy (2025).

== Early life ==
Hirsch was born in the Palms section of Los Angeles. His mother, Margaret Esther (née Davenport), is a visual artist, teacher, and pop-up book designer, and his father, David Milton Hirsch, was an entrepreneur, manager, and film producer. He is of German Jewish, English, and Scots-Irish ancestry. He has an older sister, Jennifer, and was raised in Los Angeles and Santa Fe, New Mexico, where he lived with his mother for several years. Hirsch attended Alexander Hamilton High School where he studied in the music program.

== Career ==
Hirsch began acting on television roles in the late 1990s. He starred in the Showtime original film Wild Iris (2001), with Laura Linney and Gena Rowlands. He made his cinematic film debut for The Dangerous Lives of Altar Boys (2002) and next starred with Kevin Kline in The Emperor's Club (2002).

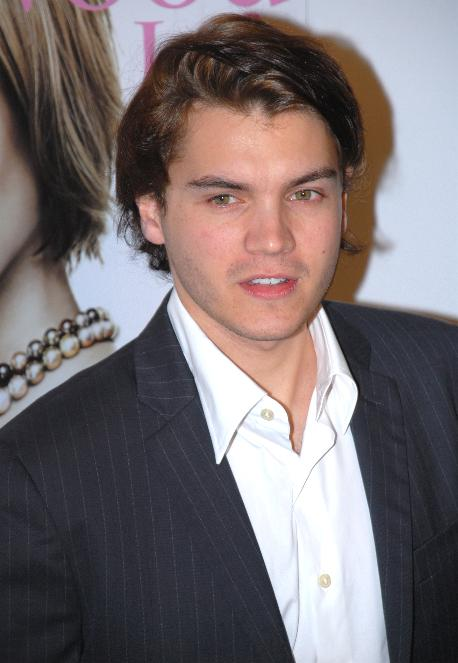
Hirsch at Hollywood Life Magazine's 7th Annual Breakthrough Awards in 2007

In 2004, Hirsch starred in The Girl Next Door. He starred with Jeff Daniels and Sigourney Weaver in the limited release Imaginary Heroes (2004). In 2005, Hirsch starred in Catherine Hardwicke's film Lords of Dogtown (2005) about a group of skaters in the 1970s and their role in the birth of skateboard culture. Hirsch played Jay Adams. He played a character based on a real-life drug dealer, Jesse James Hollywood, in Alpha Dog (2006).

Hirsch played Christopher McCandless in Into the Wild (2007). He lost 40 pounds for the role, which earned him a Screen Actors Guild nomination for best actor. Esquire said, "[Hirsch] creates a vivid, unforgettable character you at once admire and pity."

Hirsch had the title role in the Wachowskis' Speed Racer, which was released on May 9, 2008 and was a box office bomb. Hirsch played gay-rights activist Cleve Jones in Gus Van Sant's biopic Milk (2008). He also appeared in Ang Lee's Taking Woodstock (2009), based on a screenplay of the Elliot Tiber memoir Taking Woodstock. He then starred in William Friedkin's 2011 southern gothic thriller Killer Joe.

In April 2011, he was cast in Oliver Stone's Savages, which was released in July 2012.

In 2012, Hirsch starred with Penélope Cruz in Venuto al Mondo, a film by Italian director Sergio Castellitto. In 2013, he was in Prince Avalanche, co-starring Paul Rudd.

Hirsch starred in The Motel Life, co-starring Dakota Fanning and Stephen Dorff, directed by the Polsky brothers. In 2013, he starred with Holliday Grainger, Holly Hunter, and William Hurt in the miniseries Bonnie & Clyde. Hirsch co-starred in the film Lone Survivor, based on the memoir of Navy SEAL Marcus Luttrell.

In February 2017, it was announced that Hirsch would star with Aubrey Plaza in the comedy An Evening with Beverly Luff Linn.

In May 2018, Hirsch became the new voice for character James Lake Jr. in the Netflix original DreamWorks show Trollhunters: Tales of Arcadia from Guillermo del Toro, replacing Anton Yelchin in its third season following his death. Hirsch continues to reprise the role of Jim in 3Below, Wizards and Trollhunters: Rise of the Titans.

In 2019, Hirsch portrayed Hollywood hairdresser and Manson family victim Jay Sebring in the film Once Upon a Time in Hollywood.

== Music ==
On October 25, 2019, Hirsch released his first album under Hirsch called Mnemonic. Two of its songs, "Tooth Fairy" and "Angels Will", were selected to be on the New Alt playlist on Spotify. KROQ DJ Megan Holiday also picked Mnemonic as one of her favorite albums of the year. After that album's release, Hirsch released the single "American Dreamin'", and on 2/14 released his new single "Casual Animal."

Hirsch has released five singles, starting with "Remember Days When," (which he co-wrote with Foster The People's Mark Foster) and "Hard Hearts". He released "Prisoners" and "The Same Different" and then "Favors". Both "Prisoners" and "Favors" were both put on Spotify's New Noise Playlist. "Favors" was also put on multiple playlists on Deezer, including #3 placement on "Seleccíon Editorial Mexico y Central America," one of Deezer's biggest playlists worldwide, with 6.7 million followers.

After releasing more singles over the course of a year, Hirsch released his second album called Denihilism on March 12, 2021.

== Personal life ==
Hirsch resides in Los Angeles. He has a son born in October 2013. His relationship with his son's mother ended before the birth of their child.

=== Assault charge ===
In 2015 Hirsch was charged with aggravated assault after attacking and attempting to strangle a female Paramount Pictures executive with his bare hands at a nightclub in Park City, Utah. Hirsch claimed he did not remember what had happened as the event happened when he was taking stimulants while inebriated. He pleaded guilty to misdemeanor assault and was sentenced to 15 days in jail. He was also fined $4,750, received 90 days of probation, and was ordered to perform 50 hours of community service. Hirsch entered a rehabilitation facility following the assault.

== Filmography ==
=== Film ===
Emile Hirsch's film appearances
Year	Title	Role	Notes/Ref.
1996	Sugared Peas	Brad	Short film
2002	The Dangerous Lives of Altar Boys	Francis Doyle	
2002	The Emperor's Club	Sedgewick Bell	Nominated — Young Artist Award for Best Performance in a Feature Film - Supporting Young Actor
2003	The Mudge Boy	Duncan Mudge	
2004	The Girl Next Door	Matthew Kidman	Nominated — MTV Movie & TV Award for Best Kiss
2004	Imaginary Heroes	Tim Travis	
2005	Lords of Dogtown	Jay Adams	Nominated — Teen Choice Award for Choice Movie: Choice Breakout Movie Actor
2006	Alpha Dog	Johnny Truelove	
2007	The Air I Breathe	Tony	
2007	Into the Wild	Chris McCandless	Nominated — Dallas-Fort Worth Film Critics Association Award for Best Actor; Nominated — Gotham Independent Film Award for Breakthrough Performer; Nominated — National Board of Review Award for Breakthrough Performance; Nominated — Alliance of Women Film Journalists Award for Unforgettable Moment; Nominated — Detroit Film Critics Society Award for Best Actor; Nominated — Critics' Choice Movie Award for Best Actor; Nominated — Online Film Critics Society for Best Actor; Nominated — Screen Actors Guild Award for Outstanding Performance by a Cast in a Motion Picture; Nominated — Screen Actors Guild Award for Outstanding Performance by a Male Actor in a Leading Role; Nominated — Teen Choice Award for Choice Movie Actor: Drama; Nominated — Vancouver Film Critics Circle Award for Best Actor; Nominated — Houston Film Critics Society Award for Best Actor
2008	Speed Racer	Speed Racer	Nominated — Teen Choice Award for Choice Movie Actor: Action/Adventure
2008	Milk	Cleve Jones	Nominated — Critics' Choice Movie Award for Best Acting Ensemble; Nominated — Screen Actors Guild Award for Outstanding Performance by a Cast in a Motion Picture
2009	Taking Woodstock	Billy	
2009	X Games 3D: The Movie	Narrator	Documentary
2011	Killer Joe	Chris Smith	
2011	The Darkest Hour	Sean	
2012	Savages	Spin	
2012	Twice Born (Venuto al mondo)	Diego	
2012	The Motel Life	Frank Flannigan	
2013	Prince Avalanche	Lance	
2013	Lone Survivor	Danny Dietz	
2015	Ten Thousand Saints	Johnny	
2015	Just Jim	Dean	
2016	Vincent N Roxxy	Vincent	
2016	The Autopsy of Jane Doe	Austin Tilden	
2017	All Nighter	Martin	
2017	I Am Heath Ledger	Himself	Documentary
2017	The Chinese Widow	Jack	
2018	An Evening with Beverly Luff Linn	Shane Danger	
2018	The Outsider	Paulie Bowers	
2018	Freaks	Henry Lewis	
2019	Peel	Peel Munter	
2019	Once Upon a Time… in Hollywood	Jay Sebring	Nominated — Screen Actors Guild Award for Outstanding Performance by a Cast in a Motion Picture
2019	Never Grow Old	Patrick Tate	
2020	Force of Nature	Cardillo	
2020	The Comeback Trail	James Moore	
2021	Son	Paul	Also executive producer
2021	Trollhunters: Rise of the Titans	Jim Lake Jr. (voice)	
2021	Midnight in the Switchgrass	Byron Crawford	
2021	American Night	Michael Rubino	
2022	The Immaculate Room	Mike	
2022	Pursuit	Rick Calloway	
2022	Dig	Victor	
2022	Devil's Workshop	Donald	
2022	The Price We Pay	Alex	
2022	State of Consciousness	Stephen	
2023	Inside Man	Bobby Belucci	
2023	The Engineer	Etan	
2023	Helen's Dead	Adam	
2023	Walden	Walden Dean	Also executive producer
2024	Prey	Grun	aka Kalahari
2024	Bau: Artist at War	Joseph Bau	
2024	Dead Money	Andy	aka Degenerate
2026	Confession	Dmitri	
2026	Woozy	Dusty	
2027	Lice	Mr. Shanker	Post-production
TBA	In Tandem †	Mar	Post-production
TBA	Conspiracy Of Thieves †	Bobby	Post-production
TBA	Turnbuckle †	Trouble Turnbuckle	Post-production
TBA	Good Side of a Bad Man †	Pretty Boy Floyd	Post-production

Key
†	Denotes films that have not yet been released

=== Television ===
Year	Title	Role	Notes/Ref.
1996	Kindred: The Embraced	Abel	Episode: "Romeo and Juliet"
1997	3rd Rock from the Sun	Punk "Bernstein boy"	Episode: "Scaredy Dick"
1997	Early Edition	Lance Foster	Episode: "March in Time"
1998	Players	Adam Paprelli	Episode: "Con-Vivants"
1998	Gargantua	Brandon Elway	Television film
1998	Houdini	Young Harry Houdini	Television film
1999	Two of a Kind	Jeremy	Episode: "Let's Dance"
1999	Sabrina, the Teenage Witch	Darryl	Episode: "Sabrina, the Matchmaker"
1999	Promised Land	Walter Elliott	Episode: "A Day in the Life"
1999	The Pretender	Bryce Banks	Episode: "End Game"
1999	Profiler	Bryce Banks	Episode: "Grand Master"
1999	NYPD Blue	Marcello Parisi	Episode: "Voir Dire This"
1999	ER	Chad Kottmeier	2 episodes
2001	Wild Iris	Lonnie Bravard	Television film
2013	Bonnie & Clyde	Clyde Barrow	2 episodes
2018	Trollhunters	Jim Lake Jr. (voice)	11 episodes
2018–2019	3Below: Tales of Arcadia	Jim Lake Jr. (voice)	3 episodes
2020	Robot Chicken	Nick Jonas, Ron Weasley (voice)	Episode: "Petless M in: Cars Are Couches On The Road"
2020	Wizards: Tales of Arcadia	Jim Lake Jr. (voice)	9 episodes

=== Video games ===
Emile Hirsch's video game appearances
Year	Title	Voice role	Ref.
2008	Speed Racer: The Videogame	Speed Racer	
2017	Walden, a game	Henry David Thoreau	
2020	Trollhunters: Defenders of Arcadia	Jim Lake Jr.	

== Awards and nominations ==
Emile Hirsch's accolades
Year	Award	Category	Nominated work	Result	Ref.
2003	Young Artist Awards	Best Performance in a Feature Film – Supporting Young Actor	The Emperor's Club	Nominated	
2005	MTV Movie & TV Awards	Best Kiss	The Girl Next Door	Nominated	
2005	Teen Choice Awards	Choice Breakout Movie Actor	Lords of Dogtown	Nominated	
2007	Dallas–Fort Worth Film Critics Association Awards	Best Actor	Into the Wild	Nominated	
2007	Gotham Awards	Breakthrough Actor	Into the Wild	Nominated	
2007	National Board of Review Awards	Breakthrough Performance	Into the Wild	Won	
2007	Alliance of Women Film Journalists Awards	Unforgettable Moment	Into the Wild	Nominated	
2007	Detroit Film Critics Society Awards	Best Actor	Into the Wild	Nominated	
2008	Critics' Choice Movie Awards	Best Actor	Into the Wild	Nominated	
2008	Online Film Critics Society Awards	Best Actor	Into the Wild	Nominated	
2008	Screen Actors Guild Awards	Outstanding Performance by a Cast in a Motion Picture	Into the Wild	Nominated	
2008	Screen Actors Guild Awards	Outstanding Performance by a Male Actor in a Leading Role	Into the Wild	Nominated	
2008	Teen Choice Awards	Choice Movie Actor: Drama	Into the Wild	Nominated	
2008	Teen Choice Awards	Choice Movie Actor: Action/Adventure	Speed Racer	Nominated	
2008	Vancouver Film Critics Circle Awards	Best Actor	Into the Wild	Nominated	
2008	Houston Film Critics Society Awards	Best Actor	Into the Wild	Nominated	
2009	Critics' Choice Movie Awards	Best Acting Ensemble	Milk	Won	
2009	Screen Actors Guild Awards	Outstanding Performance by a Cast in a Motion Picture	Milk	Nominated	
2020	Screen Actors Guild Awards	Outstanding Performance by a Cast in a Motion Picture	Once Upon a Time in Hollywood	Nominated	
