= Ángel Bonanni =

Uruguayan-born Israeli model and actor (born 1977)

- אנחל בונני
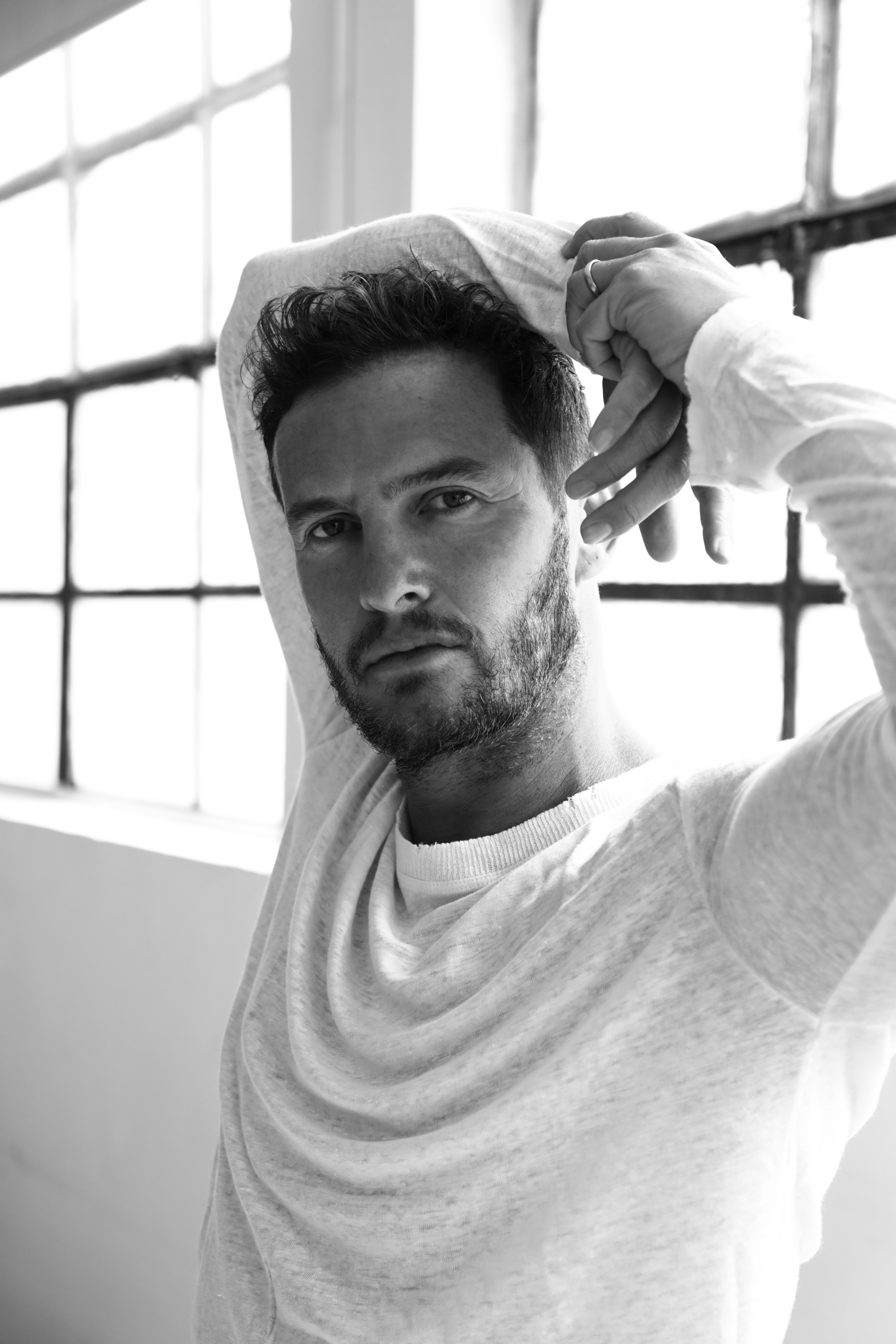
- Born: 7 February 1977 (age 49); Montevideo, Uruguay
- Occupations: Model, actor, singer
- Spouse: Andrea Leitersdorf (m. 2014)
- Children: 2

Ángel Bonanni (Hebrew: אנחל בונני; born 7 February 1977) is a Uruguayan-Israeli actor and model. In Israel, he is known for his model campaigns and acting roles in TV and film projects, such as the Israeli thriller series False Flag (Kfulim) (2015–2019). He is also known to international audiences for his English-language roles on American television. He had a recurring role on Shots Fired (2017) and a regular role as Detective Tommy Gibbs in Absentia (2017–2019). He was part of the main cast of the first season of Condor (2018), playing assassin Deacon Mailer. He also played Yonatan Netanyahu in the film, Entebbe (2018).

== Early life ==
Bonanni was born in Montevideo in Uruguay, after which his family moved to Australia. They returned to Uruguay when he was 5 years old, and moved again, this time to Israel, when he was 11. He grew up in Nof HaGalil.

== Career ==
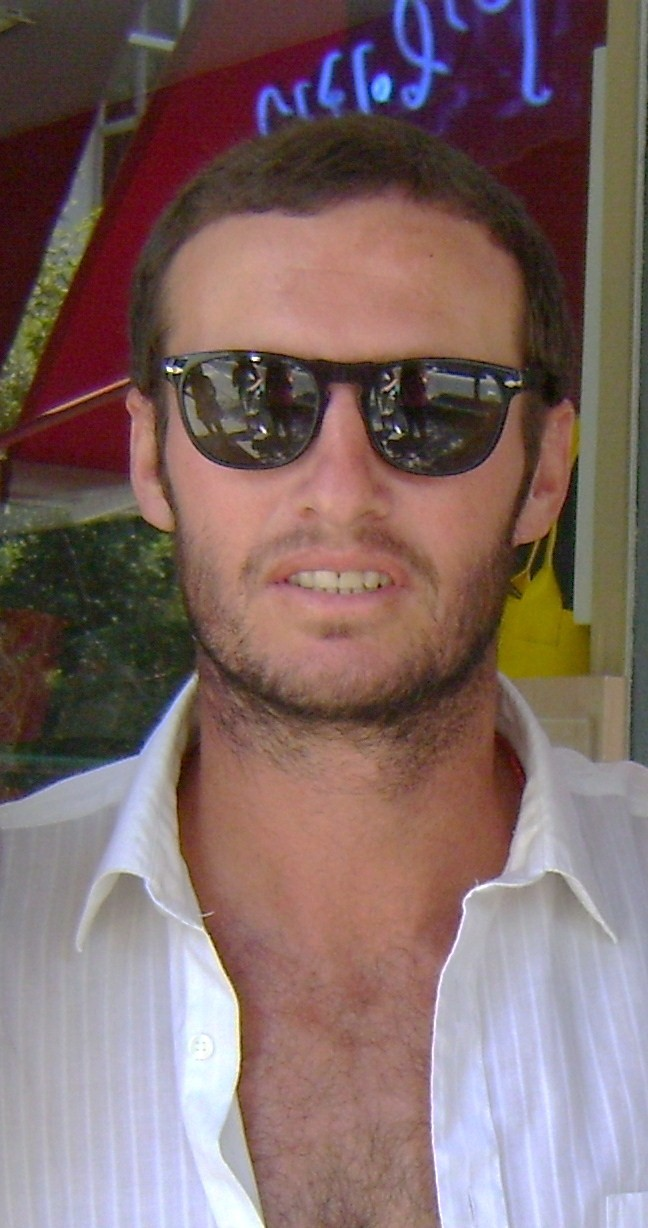
Bonanni in 2009

=== Model ===
After high school in Israel, Bonanni returned to Uruguay, where he pursued a career as a male model. He became a top model, appearing in fashion campaigns for Jean Paul Gaultier, Donna Karan and Banana Republic as well as appearing in magazines such as Harper's Bazaar.

=== Actor ===
Bonanni has had several screen roles acting in Hebrew, Spanish and English.

In Israel, he has starred in a number of high-profile film and television projects. In 2011, he had a leading role in the romantic comedy, Salsa Tel Aviv. In 2014, he appeared alongside Gal Gadot in the comedy-sports film Kicking Out Shoshana.

Between 2015 and 2019, he starred as Sean Tilson in two seasons of the Israeli thriller series, False Flag (Kfulim). The first season is based on the assassination in Dubai of Mahmoud al-Mabhouh, co-founder of the military wing of Hamas, on January 19, 2010.

He is also known to Spanish-speaking audiences for a number of projects. In 2013 he played the role of Boris Krakof in the Argentine soap opera, Solamente vos. He played an attractive chef who seeks to conquer the heart of Aurora (Natalia Oreiro), and in the process, make Juan jealous (Adrián Suar). In 2020–2021 he played Joseph in the Spanish historical drama series, El Cid. The following year, he appeared in the Spanish-Colombian film, What Lucía Saw, a film about the 1989 murders of Jesuits in El Salvador.

He has also had a number of English-speaking roles. In 2017, he had a recurring role as Javier Cano in the American drama miniseries, Shots Fired. In the same year he was cast as a series regular, playing Detective Tommy Gibbs in the American thriller drama television series, Absentia. In 2018, Bonanni played Yoni Netanyahu in Seven Days in Entebbe. In the same year he was a series regular on the American thriller television series, Condor.

In 2025, he starred as Raanan, a closeted gay man in the Israeli drama, A Man Walks Down the Street.

In the same year, Bonnani was cast in Frequency of Fear alongside Doron Ben-David, Itzik Cohen and Daniella Pick. The film is based on a covert Israeli operation in 2024 in Lebanon, using thousands of pagers and walkie-talkies to assassinate Hezbollah operatives.

=== Music ===
In 2012 Bonanni branched out into music, releasing an album with a collaborator, Gal Padeh. The duo released music in English and used the name Project Passport. Their debut single, 'Borrowed Time' is featured in the 2015 English-language Israeli horror film, JeruZalem.

== Personal life ==
He was previously in relationships with the actresses, Melanie Peres and Marina Maximilian Blum.

He married Andrea Leitersdorf in 2014, and the couple had two children through surrogacy in Georgia. The family live in Neve Tzedek in Tel Aviv.

In 2022, his younger brother, Danny, who suffered from clinical depression, committed suicide.

Bonnani's father died in 2015, followed by his mother, who suffered from Alzheimers, in 2025.

== Filmography ==
Year	Title	Role	Notes
2007	Screenz		TV series
2007–2008	Ulai Hapa'am		6 episodes
2008–2009	Hasufim (Exposed)	Ophir Zdof	Series regular
2009	Tamid oto chalom (Mary Lou)	Shlomi	TV series musical
2011	Salsa Tel Aviv	Yoni	Film
2012	Leak		Short film
2012	Rock Ba-Caspa	Chaliba	Film
2013	Solamente vos	Boris	Argentine telenovela Series regular
2014	Kicking Out Shoshana	Liran Shimoni	Film
2014	The Gordin Cell	Kicking Out Shoshana	3 episodes
2014	Shovrei Galim	Chili	Series regular
2015	Zaguri Imperia	Arik	1 episode
2015–2019	False Flag (Kfulim)	Sean Tilson	Series regular
2017	Shots Fired	Javier Cano	Recurring role
2017–2019	Absentia	Detective Tommy Gibbs	Series regular
2018	Entebbe	Yonatan Netanyahu	Film
2018	Condor	Deacon Mailer (assassin)	S1 series regular
2020	Juda		7 episodes
2020–2021	El Cid	Joseph	3 episodes
2022	What Lucía Saw	Chidester	Spanish-Colombian film
2022	Paris Boutique	Daniel	Film
2022	Baalat HaChalomot	Shlomi	Series regular, season 2
2023	Treyder	Paul Chester	Russian TV series Recurring role
2023	The Engineer	Avi	Film
2024	Escobank	Emilio	Post-production
2024	Like Ashes in Your Coffee	Mr. Segal	Post-production
2025	A Man Walks Down the Street	Raanan	Film
2026	Frequency of Fear		Film

== See also ==
- Israeli fashion
- Cinema of Israel
- Music of Israel
