= Danny Abeckaser =

Israeli-American actor and filmmaker

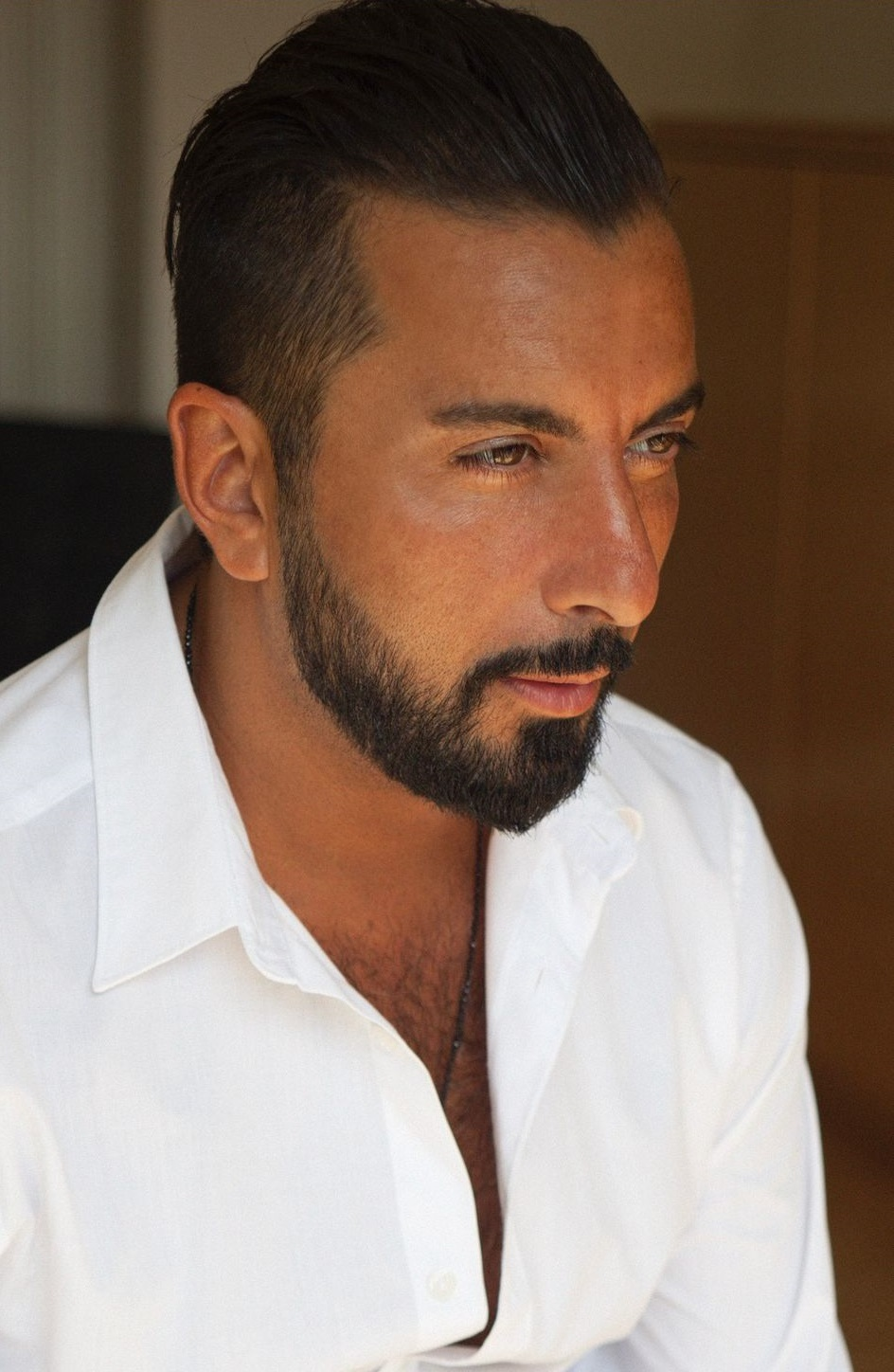
- Occupations: Actor; Director; Filmmaker
- Years active: 2001–present
- Spouse: May Almakaies (m. 2022)

Danny A. Abeckaser (Hebrew: דני א. אביכזר) is an Israeli-American actor, director and filmmaker.

== Early life ==
Abeckaser was born in Israel, the sixth of seven children of Moroccan Jewish parents who immigrated to the U.S. in 1980. He grew up in Brooklyn.

== Career ==
=== Nightclub career ===
Abeckaser worked in the nightclub industry in New York as a promoter. Well connected in the industry, he brought models to clubs, planned parties & events, and took care of the celebrity clientele. He helped to open up clubs like Avenue and Marquee. The 2015 movie Club Life, in which he co-starred, created, and co-wrote was based on these experiences.

=== Film career ===
==== As an actor ====
Abeckaser had a small part in the Vince Vaughn comedy Made in 2001, which led to receiving other small parts in movies such as Alpha Dog, You Don't Mess with the Zohan, and the TV show Entourage. He then played the part of Dino Lapron opposite Michael Shannon and Winona Ryder in the Ariel Vromen film The Iceman (2012) and had a very small role in the Martin Scorsese film The Wolf of Wall Street (2013). Abeckaser shared a scene with Robert De Niro as Louie the Deadbeat in the Scorsese film The Irishman (2019).

Abeckaser had his first starring role in A Stand Up Guy (2016). Abeckaser also appeared in Mob Town, Lansky, I Love Us, Inside Man, and The Engineer. He is represented by APA and LBI Entertainment.

==== As a director ====
He made his directorial debut with First We Take Brooklyn (2018), which he co-starred with Harvey Keitel. He has directed other movies such as I Love Us, Blackjack: The Jackie Ryan Story, Mob Town, Inside Man,The Engineerand Bardejov and 12 Hours In October.

==== As a producer ====
In 2013, Abeckaser created the production company 2B Films banner to produce his movies. Abeckaser's first movie as a producer was Holy Rollers (2010), which he also starred alongside Jesse Eisenberg. Since then, he produced other movies such as The Last Shaman, Davi's Way, as well as the movies he’s directed.

== Personal life ==
Abeckaser married Instagram model May Almakaies in May 2022 in Israel. Leonardo DiCaprio was one of the wedding guests. Abeckaser is involved with the charities Rhonda's Kiss, where he is a committee chair, and the United Hatzalah Emergency Relief Fund,.

== Filmography ==
Year	Title	Director	Producer	Writer
2010	Holy Rollers	No	Yes	No
2015	Experimenter	No	Yes	No
2015	Club Life	No	Yes	Yes
2016	A Stand Up Guy	No	Yes	No
2018	First We Take Brooklyn	Yes	Yes	Yes
2019	Mob Town	Yes	Yes	No
2020	Blackjack: The Jackie Ryan Story	Yes	Yes	No
2021	I Love Us	Yes	No	No
2023	Inside Man	Yes	Yes	No
2023	The Engineer	Yes	Yes	No
2024	Bardejov	Yes	Yes	No
2025	12 Hours in October	Yes	Yes	No
2025	The Perfect Gamble	Yes	Yes	No

Executive producer

- The Curse of Sleeping Beauty (2016)

Acting roles

Year	Title	Role	Notes
2001	Made	Club Promoter	Uncredited
2004	Point&Shoot	Danny A	
2006	Alpha Dog	Latino Youth #1	
2006	Homie Spumoni	Rosa's Maitre d	
2006	El Cantante	Studio Engineer	
2007	Gardener of Eden	Ami	
2007	The Education of Charlie Banks	Arresting Officer	
2008	You Don't Mess with the Zohan	Ze'ev	
2010	Holy Rollers	Jackie Solomon	
2011	Bucky Larson: Born to Be a Star	AFA Presenter	
2012	Freelancers	Louie	
2012	The Iceman	Dino Lapron	
2013	The Wolf of Wall Street	Investor's Center Broker #2	
2015	Experimenter	Braverman	
2015	Club Life	Mark	
2016	A Stand Up Guy	Sammy	
2016	Marauders	Antonio Leon	
2018	First We Take Brooklyn	Mikki	
2019	The Irishman	Deadbeat	
2019	Mob Town	Joe Barbara	
2021	Lansky	Greg Kunz	
2021	I Love Us	Sammy Silver	
2023	Inside Man	Roy DeMeo	
2023	The Engineer	Yakov	
2024	Bardejov	Dr. Atlas	
2025	The Perfect Gamble	Felix	
