= A Stand Up Guy =

- Theatrical release poster
- Directed by: Mike Young
- Written by: Mike Young
- Produced by: Danny A. Abeckaser; Ilan Arboleda; Vince P. Maggio
- Starring: Danny A. Abeckaser; Michael Rapaport; Ethan Suplee; Bob Saget
- Cinematography: Daniele Napolitano
- Edited by: Frank Reynolds
- Music by: Mj Mynarski
- Production company: 2B Films
- Distributed by: The Orchard
- Release date: February 9, 2016
- Running time: 90 minutes
- Country: United States
- Language: English

A Stand Up Guy is a 2016 American comedy film written and directed by Mike Young and starring Danny A. Abeckaser, Michael Rapaport, Ethan Suplee and Bob Saget. The film was released direct to DVD and digital platforms on February 9, 2016.

== Plot ==
Sammy Lagucci is a Brooklyn-based criminal who would only change his life for his little daughter. When he finds out that the gangsters he's related to are plotting to take him down, he enters the witness protection program to protect himself and his family. Ending up in a small Wisconsin town, he finds himself a good stand-up comedian and succeeds. But what should be a blessing turns into a curse as your fame grows, putting your new identity at stake.

== Cast ==
- Danny A. Abeckaser as Sammy Lagucci
- Annie Heise as Vicky
- Nick Cordero as Sal
- Luke Robertson as Dom
- Jay R. Ferguson as Manny
- Ethan Suplee as Marshal
- Michael Rapaport as Colin
- Bob Saget as Mel
