= Mob Town (2019 film) =

Film by Danny A. Abeckaser

- Release poster
- Directed by: Danny A. Abeckaser
- Written by: Jon Carlo; Joe Gilford
- Story by: Robert Ivker
- Produced by: Danny A. Abeckaser; Vince P. Maggio; Robert Ivker
- Starring: David Arquette; Jennifer Esposito; Danny A. Abeckaser; Jamie-Lynn Sigler; P. J. Byrne; James McCaffrey; Robert Davi
- Cinematography: Hernán Toro
- Edited by: David Leonard
- Music by: Lionel Cohen
- Production company: 2B Films
- Distributed by: Saban Films
- Release date: December 13, 2019
- Running time: 90 minutes
- Country: United States
- Language: English

Mob Town is a 2019 American crime drama film directed by Danny A. Abeckaser and starring David Arquette, Jennifer Esposito, Abeckaser, Jamie-Lynn Sigler, P. J. Byrne, James McCaffrey, and Robert Davi.

The film is based on the true story of a New York State Trooper who investigates the 1957 Apalachin meeting, a gathering of high-profile mobsters in his small town of Apalachin, New York. Mob Town was released in the United States on December 13, 2019, by Saban Films.

== Plot ==
On November 14, 1957, over 100 of the most notorious organized crime figures from all over the United States held a historic meeting in the small town of Apalachin, New York. The meeting was ordered by Vito Genovese, who, at the time, successfully eliminated two of his biggest rivals, Frank Costello and Albert Anastasia. Genovese, who was the current boss of the Luciano crime family, decided to consolidate power and announce to the underworld that it was his time to be Capo Dei Capi, "the boss of bosses."

In the upstate New York town of Apalachin, Sgt. Edgar Croswell, a 40-year-old divorced state trooper who lived in the police station, began noticing strange and unusual activity in the small town. A semi-retired mobster named Joseph Barbara, known as "Joe the Barber" had recently bought a nearby ginger-ale bottling plant and a 53-acre estate just outside of town. Genovese decided to hold the historical summit at the Barbara Estate. Much of the film revolves around planning for the meeting. Sgt. Croswell tried to alert local law enforcement and even the FBI, but his warnings were ignored. At the time, the FBI was so focused on fighting Communism that long-time FBI director J. Edgar Hoover refused to publicly accept the existence of a "National Crime Syndicate" and the need to address organized crime in the US.

Despite constant push back, Sgt. Croswell refused to back down and began investigating Joe the Barber and his businesses in town. After stumbling on a major clue that Joe the Barber had not only purchased every piece of meat and fish in town, he also realized the every single motel room in town was booked. Without any back up, Croswell and a handful of local police officers busted the meeting and arrested 58 of the most notorious Mafia figures. Although all the arrests were eventually overturned, Sgt. Croswell single-handedly forced the FBI to publicly acknowledge the existence of an organized-crime syndicate in the US, leading J. Edgar Hoover to create an organized-crime task force. This also led to the creation of the Racketeer Influenced and Corrupt Organizations (RICO) Act, which law-enforcement agencies currently use to fight organized crime.

== Cast ==
- David Arquette as Sgt. Ed Croswell
- Jennifer Esposito as Natalie Passatino
- Danny A. Abeckaser as Joe Barbara
- Jamie-Lynn Sigler as Josephine Barbara
- Nick Cordero as Vincent Gigante
- Robert Davi as Vito Genovese
- P. J. Byrne as Vincent Vasisko
- Gino Cafarelli as Carmine Galante
- James McCaffrey as Chief Lane

== Release ==
Mob Town premiered at the Los Angeles Film School on December 13, 2019, and was released on the same day in select theaters and on video on demand in the United States by Saban Films.

== Reception ==
On the review aggregator website Rotten Tomatoes, the film holds an approval rating of 0% based on eight reviews, with an average rating of 5/10. Metacritic, which uses a weighted average, assigned the film a score of 28 out of 100, based on four critics, indicating "generally unfavorable" reviews.
