= Hernán Toro =

Venezuelan cinematographer (born c. 1950)

Hernán Toro (born c. 1950s) is a Venezuelan cinematographer.

He filmed 100 años de perdón a gangster comedy in 1998.

== Filmography ==
- The Child Within (2007) (post-production)
- As Luck Would Have It (2003)
- 3 noches (2001)
- Puppet (1999)
- 100 años de perdón (1998)
- Voz del corazón, La (1997)
- Twisted (1996)
- Señora Bolero (1993)
- Roraima (1992)
- Zoológico (1992)
- Sueño en el abismo, Un (1991)
- Escándalo, El (1987)
- Operación billete (1987)
- Detrás de la noticia (1986)
- Agonía (1985)
