= Robert Davi =

American actor, singer, filmmaker (born 1951)

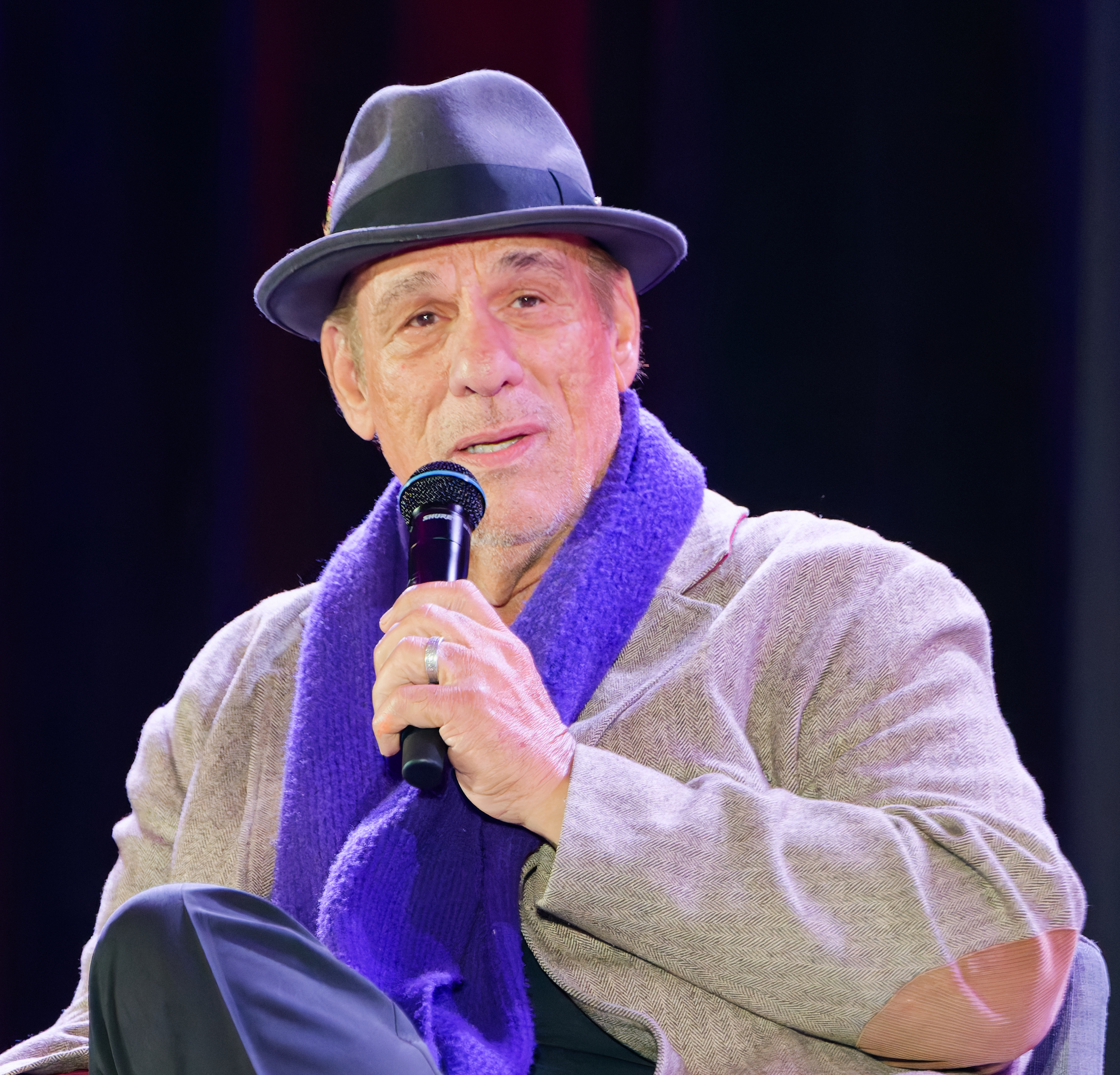
- Davi in 2025
- Born: Robert John Davi; June 26, 1951 (age 75); Queens, New York City, U.S.
- Education: Hofstra University (B.A.)
- Occupations: Actor; singer; filmmaker
- Years active: 1977–present
- Spouses: Jan Borenstein (m. 1970; div. 1980) Jeri McBride (m. 1980; div. 1990) Christine Bolster (m. 1990; div. 2019) Diana Davi (m. 2019)
- Children: 6
- Musical career
- Genres: Traditional pop; Great American Songbook
- Instrument: Vocals
- Website: davisingssinatra.com

Robert John Davi (born June 26, 1951) is an American actor, singer, and filmmaker. Over the course of his acting career, Davi has performed in more than 130 films. Among his most known roles are opera-singing Jake Fratelli in The Goonies (1985), FBI Special Agent Johnson in Die Hard (1988), James Bond villain Franz Sanchez in Licence to Kill (1989), police deputy chief Phil Heinemann in Predator 2 (1990) and strip club manager Al Torres in Showgirls (1995). On television, he portrayed FBI Special Agent Bailey Malone in the NBC television series Profiler (1996–2000).

Classically trained as a singer, Davi launched his professional singing career in 2011. His first album, Davi Sings Sinatra – On the Road to Romance, hit No. 6 on the Billboard jazz charts. Praised for his strong baritone voice and vocal interpretations, Davi debuted as a headliner at The Venetian Las Vegas six months after the record was released.

In 2016, Davi replaced Jerry Doyle as radio host for a nationally syndicated radio program on Talk Radio Network.

== Early life ==
Robert Davi was born on June 26, 1951, in Astoria, Queens, New York, the son of Maria (née Rulli) and Sal Davi. His mother was an Italian American whose family came from Nusco, Avellino, Campania, and his grandfather and father were from Torretta, Palermo, Sicily. His grandfather, Franco, enlisted in the U.S. Army after emigrating and served in World War I. He received an Oak Leaf Cluster for his services.

Davi spoke Italian during his childhood. He attended Seton Hall, a Roman Catholic high school in Patchogue, New York. There he studied opera vocals, and became the winner of the New York State School Music Association Solo Competition at the age of fifteen. He has two sisters, Yvonne Davi (deceased), and Michelle Queal. He graduated from Hofstra University, which he attended because of that university's strong drama department as well as its reproduction of Shakespeare's Globe Theater. Davi studied with acting coach Stella Adler when he moved to Manhattan. During this time he was also a member of the Actors Studio, where he studied with Lee Strasberg.

== Career ==
=== Acting ===
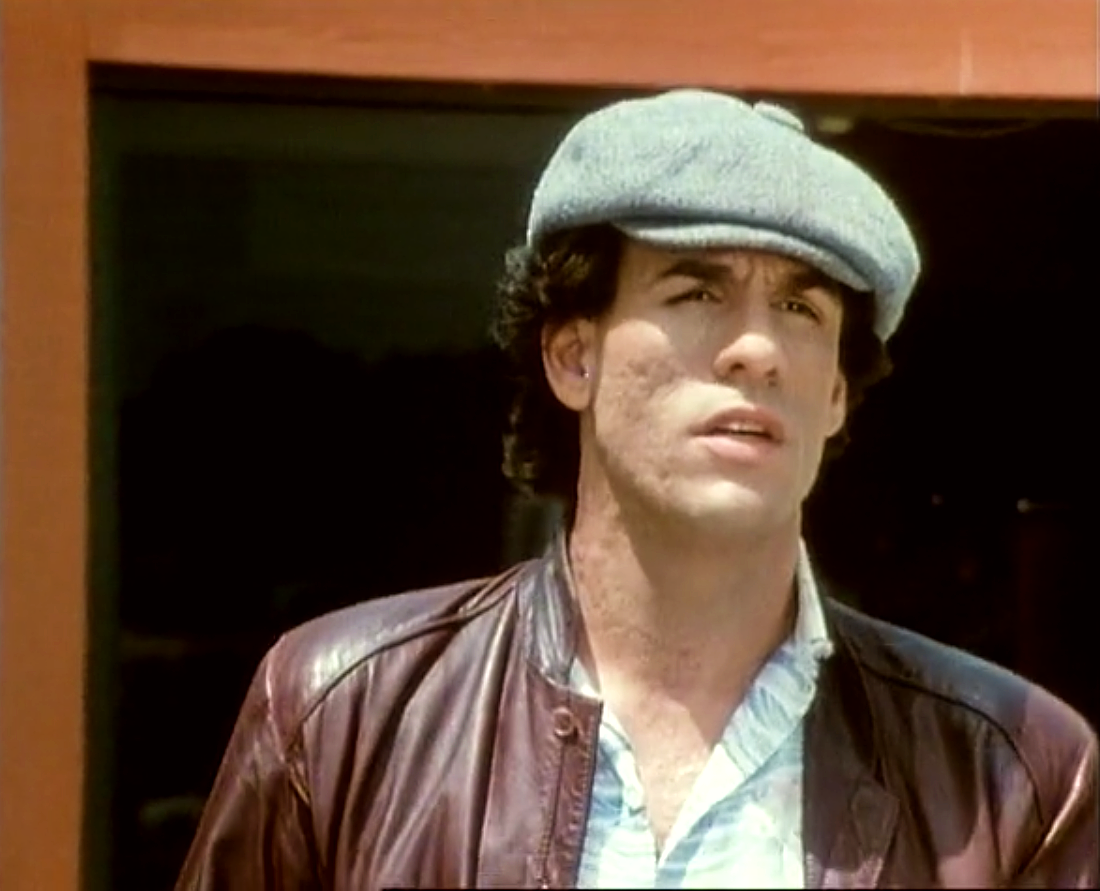
Davi in a 1983 episode of The Optimist

Davi made his television film debut in Contract on Cherry Street, in which he shared the screen with Frank Sinatra. Davi later mentioned Sinatra as an early supporter. He was also the lead in "Terrorist on Trial: The United States vs. Salim Ajami", a performance that received critical praise. In 1989, he had a recurring role on the television series Wiseguy.

As for major motion pictures, he has appeared in films including The Goonies, where his role of Jake Fratelli was based upon Davi’s own artistic ideas differing from the original script. He also appearred in Predator 2, Illicit Behavior, Night Trap, The Iceman, Mob Town, Buckle Up, Inside Man, Die Hard, Showgirls, Son of the Pink Panther, and in the Bond film Licence to Kill (1989) as the villain Franz Sanchez, a South American drug lord and murderer. During the 1990s, he played the role of FBI detective Bailey Malone on the television series Profiler. He also starred in comedic films, including the 2002 movies The 4th Tenor and The Hot Chick. The year he also produced and was lead actor in the independent film The Hitters. In 2004, Davi was cast as the antagonist Acastus Kolya in the television series Stargate: Atlantis, a military leader for the enemy group the Genii.

In 2014, Davi appeared as Goran Vata in The Expendables 3. In 2015, Davi appeared in a music video for Bob Dylan's recording of "The Night They Called It a Day", from Dylan's album Shadows in the Night, a selection of songs which had been recorded by Frank Sinatra. Rolling Stone suggested that Davi's role in the video may be a nod towards Davi's having made his acting debut alongside Sinatra in the crime film Contract on Cherry Street, and Davi's release of his own album of Sinatra covers. In 2014 he was awarded the Lifetime Achievement Award from the Long Island Film and TV Foundation.

In 2015, he interpreted Gabriele Tinti's poetry giving voice to the Boxer at Rest at the Getty Museum. As of 2021, he had acted in more than 160 films and television shows.

=== Directing ===
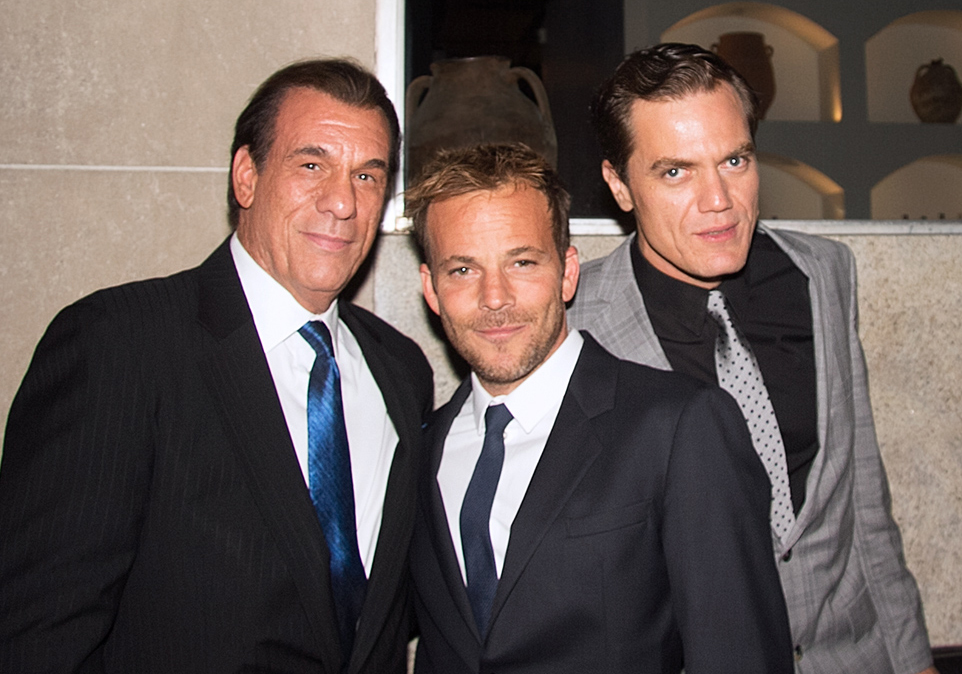
Davi with Stephen Dorff and Michael Shannon at the 2012 Toronto International Film Festival

Davi is the owner and founder of Sun Lion Films. In 2007, Davi made his directorial debut with The Dukes, a parable regarding the mid-2000 economic crisis and its impact. The film starred Davi himself, Chazz Palminteri, and Peter Bogdanovich. The Dukes was selected for the premiere section at the Rome Film Festival, along with films by Francis Ford Coppola, Sean Penn, Robert Redford, and Sidney Lumet. Davi was the only first-time director in the premiere section. The film was screened internationally and won awards at Queens International Film Festival, WorldFest Houston, Monte-Carlo Comedy Film Festiva and the Festival international du film de comédie de l'Alpe d'Huez. In 2011, David sold an original screenplay entitled The Voice to Atmosphere Entertainment MM. The production company said of Davi’s anticipated role in the film that “The character that he will portray is so impassioned and obsessed with finding the secret to Sinatra’s voice that it brings him to the brink of insanity.” In 2017, a documentary entitled Davi’s Way, about Davi’s real life performance of Sinatra’s work, was premiered at the Buffalo Niagara Film Festival. Davi directed his third film, My Son Hunter, it was released on September 7, 2022. He was approached in 2021 to direct the film by documentary filmmakers Phelim McAleer and Ann McElhinney, which focuses on the relationship between Hunter Biden and his father.

=== Recording ===
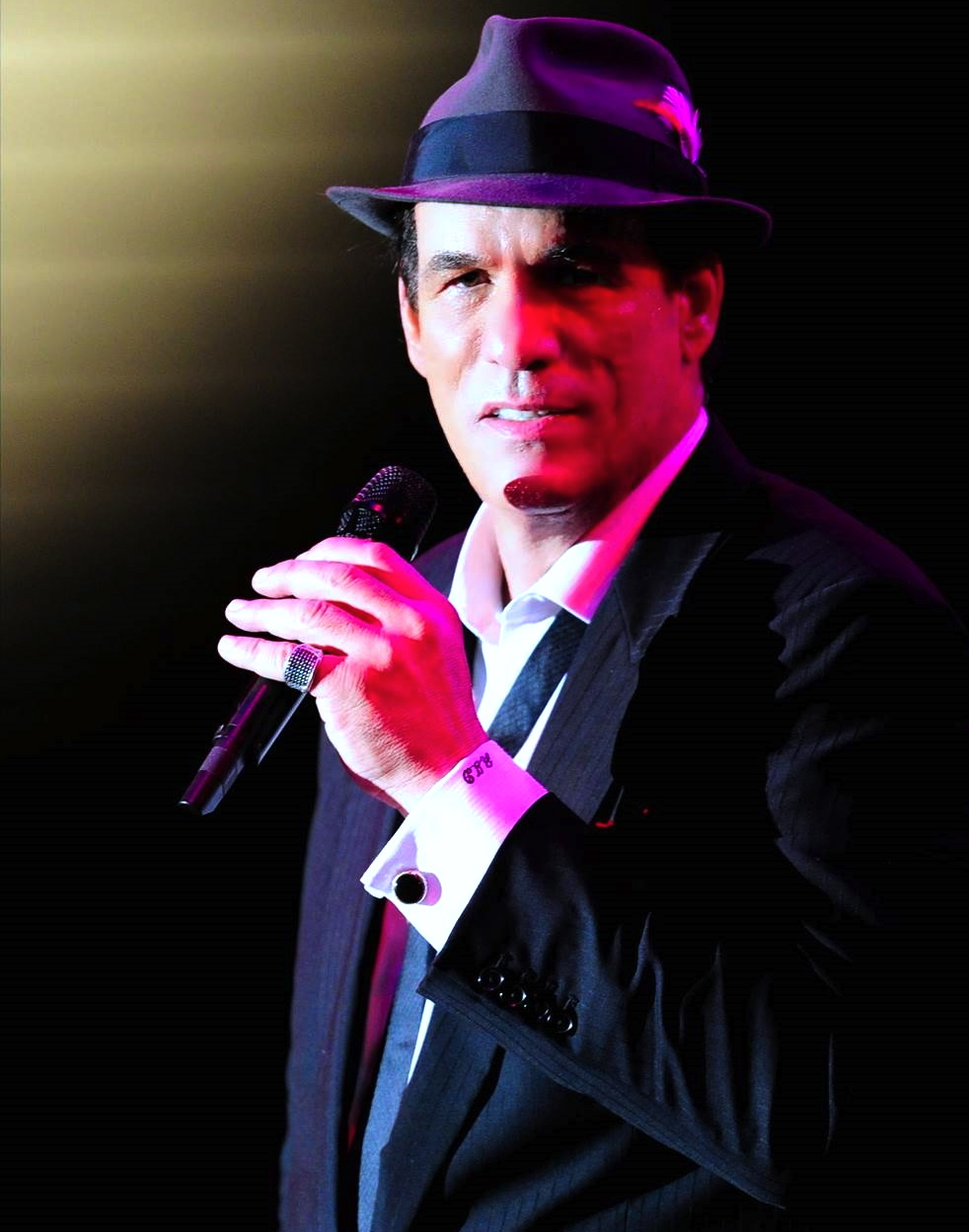
Davi in 2013

In high school, Davi was praised for his singing, and auditioned for the Metropolitan Opera after being awarded first place at the New York State School Music Association's Solo Competition, where he sang Vincent Youman's "Without A Song". He subsequently received classical training with vocal teachers Samuel Margolis and Danial Ferro of Juilliard and Tito Gobbi. Davi damaged his voice and later explained that he was a baritone with the "heart of a tenor and had pushed too hard, too early".

Davi began to focus again on singing in 2011, and worked with Gary Catona as he prepared to record his first children's album.

With a thirty-piece orchestra, Davi recorded the album at the Capitol Records Building in Hollywood. The album was produced by Phil Ramone, engineered by Dan Wallin, and mixed by Al Schmitt. The album, Davi Sings Sinatra -- On The Road To Romance, was released on October 24, 2011, and garnered positive reviews. Jazztimes called Davi Sings Sinatra "uniformly impressive", and critic Don Heckman wrote in the Orange County Register that "there are, of course, dozens of Sinatra imitators and simulators. But what Davi does is a whole different matter. A tribute? Yes, indeed; all that and more." AllMusic noted that "Davi makes no attempt to copy Sinatra's vocal sound ... Rather, he is his own singer." The album reached the Top 10 on the Billboard jazz charts.

In December 2012, Davi appeared along with Roger Cicero in the French/German Arte TV program Durch die Nacht mit … The episode was shot in the Little Italy area of New York City and featured conversation between Cicero and Davi and solos of Sinatra standards by both performers. In December 2013, Davi released a Christmas single, "Mistletoe and Holly", with all proceeds benefiting The Salvation Army.

That year he performed tribute concert series for Frank Sinatra at the Venetian Showroom in Las Vegas. During his Sinatra performances, which he has toured with, he has a selection of 300 songs to choose from depending on the audience and mood in the room. He has been called one of the premiere Frank Sinatra cover acts in the United States, with the Huffington Post calling him “A legend in the making” in 2013.

Davi has lent his voice to political ads, including Carly Fiorina's "Demon Sheep" attack ad, "Hot Air: The Movie", and others produced by media consultant Fred Davis.

Davi was chosen by the United Nations to celebrate the Transformative Power of Music at the General Assembly in New York, in June 2015 – and again for the 70th Anniversary Celebration of the UN in September 2015.

Davi was chosen to tribute Sinatra's 100th birthday for the July 4 PBS special; it was watched by 500,000 people outside the Capitol Building in DC and 15 million viewers.

Davi was the guest singer on the Italian version of the TV program The Voice.

In 2024, he will be releasing his album I’m Not Anyone.

== Personal life ==
Davi was married to Jan Borenstein from 1970 to 1980. His second marriage was to Jeri McBride from 1980 to 1990; they had one son. His next marriage was to Christine Bolster in 1990, which ended in 2019. They have four children together. Davi married Diana Davi in 2019, and they have a daughter. He is a recipient of the George M. Estabrook Distinguished Service Award from the Hofstra University Alumni Association, has served on the Steering Committee for George Washington University’s Homeland Security Policy Institute, and is a past recipient of the Man of the Year Award from the Los Angeles FBI.

=== Political views ===
Davi is a right-wing political conservative, often speaking at Republican Party gatherings and expressing far-right views on immigration. He has been invited to comment on numerous political shows and backed John McCain during his presidential campaign. He narrated several film montages that aired during the 2008 Republican National Convention. Davi has spoken at numerous Conservative Political Action Conferences in Washington, D.C. He was a frequent guest on Fox News's late-night satire program Red Eye w/ Greg Gutfeld. Davi endorsed Donald Trump in the 2016 U.S. presidential election, again in 2020, and again in 2024. He has issued statements supporting fellow conservative celebrities, including Jon Voight.

Davi is an outspoken political conservative whose commentary on immigration, integration, and Islam has drawn significant public backlash. In a November 2015 op-ed for the right-wing Breitbart News, Davi argued that Islam requires a "reformation", expressed support for the condemnation of "all Muslims", and advocated for a total suspension of immigration to the United States until incoming immigrants are fully assimilated.

In July 2026, Davi generated widespread controversy after posting a highly hostile video targeting New York City Mayor Zohran Mamdani. The dispute arose after a City Hall map of "immigrant enclaves" mistakenly omitted the historic neighborhood of Little Italy. In the video, Davi repeatedly insulted the mayor as a "jerk", a "garbage man", and a "leftist Marxist Communist" before threatening to spit on Mamdani, and telling Mamdani, who immigrated to the U.S. from Uganda as a child, to "go back to where you belong". Davi further stated, "I hope every New York Italian American and Irish American spits on you when they see you," and proposed a constitutional amendment to prevent first-generation immigrants from holding public office. Critics and political commentators widely condemned Davi's rhetoric as xenophobic, Islamophobic, and an incitement to harassment.

=== Philanthropy ===
Davi has been active in various children’s non-profits. He is also a goodwill ambassador for the Saint Pio Foundation.

== Awards and honors ==
For his contributions to the Canadian Italian community, Davi was added to Toronto's Italian Walk of Fame in 2013.

He was nominated for a Golden Raspberry Award for Worst Supporting Actor for his portrayal of Al Torres in Showgirls (1995).

== Filmography ==
=== Film ===
Year	Title	Role	Notes
1984	City Heat	Nino	
1985	The Goonies	Jake Fratelli	
1986	Raw Deal	Max Keller	
1987	Wild Thing	"Chopper"	
1988	Action Jackson	Tony Moretti	
1988	Die Hard	FBI Special Agent Johnson	
1988	Traxx	Aldo Palucci	
1989	Licence to Kill	Franz Sanchez	
1990	Peacemaker	Sergeant Frank Ramos	
1990	Deceptions	Jack "Harley" Kessler	
1990	Maniac Cop 2	Detective Sean McKinney	
1990	Predator 2	Deputy Chief Phil Heinemann	
1990	Amazon	Dan	
1991	White Hot: The Mysterious Murder of Thelma Todd	Charlie "Lucky" Luciano	
1991	The Taking of Beverly Hills	Robert Masterson	
1991	Legal Tender	Fix Cleary	
1991	Wild Orchid II: Two Shades of Blue	"Sully" Sullivan	
1992	Christopher Columbus: The Discovery	Martín Alonso Pinzón	
1992	Center of the Web	Richard Morgan	
1992	Maniac Cop III: Badge of Silence	Detective Sean McKinney	
1993	Night Trap	Detective Mike Turner	
1993	Son of the Pink Panther	Hans Zarba	
1994	No Contest	Sergeant Crane	
1994	Cops and Robbersons	Horace Osborn	
1995	Delta of Venus	The Collector	
1995	Showgirls	Al Torres	
1995	The Dogfighters	Rowdy Welles	
1995	Cyber Vengeance	R.D. Crowley	
1996	An Occasional Hell	State Trooper Abbott	
1997	The Bad Pack	McQue	
2001	Soulkeeper	Mallion	
2002	The Sorcerer's Apprentice	Merlin, Milner	
2002	The 4th Tenor	Lerra	
2002	The Hot Chick	Stan, April's Dad	
2002	Hitters	Nick	Also producer
2003	One Last Ride	Father	
2004	Call Me: The Rise and Fall of Heidi Fleiss	Ivan Nagy	
2005	In the Mix	"Fish"	
2007	The Dukes	Danny	Also directorial debut, screenwriter and producer
2008	An American Carol	Aziz	
2008	American Summer	Himself	
2009	The Butcher	Murdoch	
2009	Ballistica	Macarthur	Also executive producer
2010	Magic Man	Simpson	
2010	Game of Death	Frank Smith	
2010	Magic	David Ortero	Also director and producer
2011	Kill the Irishman	Ray Ferritto	
2011	Swamp Shark	Sheriff Watson	
2012	The Iceman	Leo Merks	Based on Anthony Gaggi
2013	Doonby	Sheriff Woodley	
2013	Blood of Redemption	Hayden	
2014	Black Rose	Captain Frank Dalano	
2014	A Long Way Off	Frank	
2014	The Expendables 3	Goran Vata	
2014	Lost Time	Xavier Reed	Also executive producer
2015	Sicilian Vampire	Salvatore "Big Sal"	
2016	Criminal	Admiral Lance	Uncredited
2018	Bachelor Lions	Maurice	
2019	Mob Town	Vito Genovese	
2020	Roe v. Wade	William J. Brennan Jr.	
2022	The Man Who Drew God	Lawyer	
2022	My Son Hunter	—N/a	Director
2023	Inside Man	Anthony 'Nino' Gaggi	
2023	The Engineer	Senator David Adler	
2024	Bardejov	Refuel Lowy	
2024	Reagan	Leonid Brezhnev	
TBA	Bad News on the Doorstep		Post-production

=== Television ===
Year	Title	Role	Notes
1977	Contract on Cherry Street	Mickey Sinardos, Greek Hijacker	TV movie
1978	Charlie's Angels	Ritchie	Episode: "Mother Angel"
1979	From Here to Eternity	Guard	TV miniseries
1979	The Legend of the Golden Gun	William Quantrill	TV movie
1979	Lou Grant	Hector	Episode: "Hector"
1979	The Incredible Hulk	Rader	Episode: "The Slam"
1979	Barnaby Jones	Pete Cerilla	Episode: "False Witness"
1979	Trapper John, M.D.	Officer Ed Buxton	Episode: "Licensed to Kill"
1980	Alcatraz: The Whole Shocking Story	Hubbard	TV movie
1981	Dynasty	Amos	Episode: "The Honeymoon"
1981	Shannon	Mel	Episode: "Gotham Swansong"
1981	The Gangster Chronicles	Vito Genovese	TV miniseries
1982	St. Elsewhere	Parick	2 episodes
1982	T. J. Hooker	Joe 'The Barber' Picartus, Tom Warfield	2 episodes
1982	The Powers of Matthew Star	Zealotta	Episode: "The Italian Caper"
1982	Hill Street Blues	Stan Mizell	Episode: "Stan the Man"
1983	The Optimist	The Cabbie	Episode: "Burning Rubber"
1983–1984	The Fall Guy	Scar De Bond, Dan Kowal	2 episodes
1984	Hart to Hart	Tony Bairos	Episode: "Always, Elizabeth"
1984	The A-Team	Boyle	Episode: "Sheriffs of Rivertown"
1985	Hunter	Sonny Dunbar	Episode: "Million Dollar Misunderstanding"
1986	The Equalizer	Michael Riegert	Episode: "Wash Up"
1988	L.A. Law	Dominic Simonetti	Episode: "Leapin' Lizards"
1989	Wiseguy	Albert Cerrico	5 episodes
1993	FBI: The Untold Stories	Joe Pistone	2 episodes
1994	Blind Justice	Alacran	TV movie
1995	VR.5	Simon Buchanan	Episode: "Simon's Choice"
1996–2000	Profiler	FBI Agent Bailey Malone	84 episodes
1999	Batman Beyond	Dr. Mike Morgan / Magma	Voice, episode: "Heroes"
1999–2000	The Pretender	Agent Bailey Malone	2 episodes
2004	Karen Sisco	Denton	Episode: "No One's Girl"
2004–2008	Stargate: Atlantis	Acastus Kolya	6 episodes
2005	Breaking Vegas	The Narrator	4 episodes
2006	Huff	Dickins	Episode: "Which Lip Is the Cervical Lip?"
2010	Nip/Tuck	Christian's Dad	Episode: "Christian Troy II"
2010	Criminal Minds	Detective Kurzbard	2 episodes
2014	CSI: Crime Scene Investigation	Marvin Braxton	Episode: "Uninvited"
2014	Asteroid vs. Earth	General Masterson	TV movie
2015	Hell's Kitchen	Himself	Reality TV series
2021–2022	Paper Empire	Lawrence Fintch	11 episodes
2026	Tulsa King	Bartolomeo Turco	Season 4

=== Video games ===
Year	Title	Role	Notes
2002	Grand Theft Auto: Vice City	Colonel Juan Garcia Cortez	
2002	Disney's PK: Out of the Shadows	General Zondag	
2004	Halo 2	Rtas 'Vadum	
2006	Scarface: The World Is Yours	Alejandro Sosa	
2007	Halo 3	Rtas 'Vadum	

=== Music videos ===
Year	Title	Role
2008	"Burnin' Up"	Jonas Brothers
2015	"The Night We Called It a Day"	Bob Dylan
2015	"Sopra la media"	J-Ax
