= List of Phi Gamma Delta members =

Phi Gamma Delta is a North American social college fraternity was founded in 1848, at Jefferson College in Canonsburg, Pennsylvania. Following are some of the fraternity's notable members.

== Academia ==
- Lotus Coffman: president of the University of Minnesota
- George Barton Cutten: president of Acadia University and Colgate University
- Charles A. Beard: history professor at Columbia University
- Mitch Daniels: former president of Purdue University, West Lafayette, Indiana and former governor of Indiana
- David Kinley: president of the University of Illinois
- Jere Morehead (University of Georgia, 1988); President of University of Georgia
- William Lambdin Prather (Washington and Lee, 1871); President of University of Texas; originator of the phrase "The Eyes of Texas are Upon You"
- Bernadotte Everly Schmitt (Tennessee, 1904): professor of Modern European History at the University of Chicago and winner of the 1931 Pulitzer Prize for History
- James J. Stukel (Purdue University): 15th President, University of Illinois
- James Woodrow (Jefferson College): president of the College of South Carolina, professor at Columbia Theological Seminary, and editor of Southern Presbyterian Review

== Business ==
- Samuel G. Allen, railroad industrialist
- John W. Creighton Jr. (University of Pittsburgh, Ohio State University, 1954), president and CEO of Weyerhaeuser and president of the Boy Scouts of America
- John C. Cushman III (Colgate University, 1963), real estate executive, chairman of the board of Cushman & Wakefield, and president of the Boy Scouts of America
- Thomas Dundon (SMU, 1993): Owner of the Carolina Hurricanes of the National Hockey League
- Stu Evey (Washington, 1956): former Chairman of the Board of ESPN
- Giovanni Feroce (University of Rhode Island, 1991): former CEO of Alex and Ani; current CEO of Benrus
- Jess Jackson (California, 1952): wine entrepreneur; namesake of Kendall-Jackson winery and majority owner of Curlin, the 2007 Preakness Stakes winner, 2007 Belmont Stakes second-place finisher, and 2007 Kentucky Derby third-place finisher
- Fritz Henderson (Michigan, 1980): President and CEO of General Motors
- Philip Knight (Oregon, 1959): co-founder, owner and president of Nike Corporation; billionaire
- Elisha Lee: Vice President of the Pennsylvania Railroad
- Josiah K. Lilly III (Cornell, 1939): philanthropist; Lilly Endowment and heir to Eli Lilly and Company
- Edmund C. Lynch (Johns Hopkins University, 1907): a founder of the Merrill Lynch investment company
- Patrick McGovern (MIT, 1959): Chairman of the Board of International Data Group; founder of the McGovern Institute for Brain Research; billionaire
- Nelson Peltz: billionaire businessman and investor
- Edwin W. Rice: president and one of the three fathers of General Electric
- Charles E. Rushmore (College of the City of New York, 1876): businessman, philanthropist, donor, and namesake of the Mount Rushmore National Memorial
- Tom Ryan (Rhode Island, 1975): President and CEO of CVS
- Donald Trump Jr. (University of Pennsylvania): EVP of The Trump Organization
- Alfred J. Verrecchia (Rhode Island, 1965): Chairman of the Board of Hasbro Inc.
- Kessel Stelling (Georgia, 1978): Chairman of the Board & CEO of Synovus Bank
- Byron Trott (University of Chicago, 1981): founder, chairman, and CEO of BDT Capital Partners
- Charlie Ergen (University of Tennessee, 1975): co-founder and chairman of Dish Network and EchoStar; billionaire

== Entertainment ==
- Roone Arledge (Columbia, 1952): former President of ABC News and Sports; first producer of Wide World of Sports; creator of Monday Night Football, 20/20, ABC World News Tonight, Nightline, This Week, and Primetime Live; won 37 Emmy Awards; is in the Television Hall of Fame
- Scott Bakula (Kansas, 1977): actor, Quantum Leap, Murphy Brown, and Star Trek: Enterprise
- William Jan Berry (UCLA, 1963): singer and guitar player, "surfer sound" duo Jan and Dean
- Holden Bowler (University of Idaho, 1931): singer in the Robert Shaw Chorale; namesake of J. D. Salinger's character Holden Caulfield
- Dick Carson (University of Nebraska, 1949): television director
- Johnny Carson (Nebraska, 1949): former host of NBC's The Tonight Show Starring Johnny Carson, and Presidential Medal of Freedom recipient
- David H. DePatie (Sewanee, 1951): film producer; producer of animated cartoons
- Radney Foster (Sewanee, 1982): country music singer/songwriter
- Matthew C. Fox (Columbia, 1989): actor known for Party of Five and Lost
- Jim Gaffigan (Purdue University, 1987): comedian
- Major Garrett (University of Missouri): Chief White House Correspondent with CBS News
- Bill Geist (Illinois, 1967):Emmy Award-winning journalist and contributor to CBS Sunday Morning
- Samuel S. Hinds (New York University, 1897): actor known for It's A Wonderful Life
- Jason Isbell (University of Memphis), : rock and alt-country singer/songwriter; member of Drive-By Truckers and Jason Isbell and the 400 Unit
- Richard Jenkins (Illinois Wesleyan University), actor known for Step Brothers and Six Feet Under
- Rob Johnson (DePauw University): Emmy Award-winning news anchor
- Paul Kangas (Michigan, 1959): anchor and commentator on Nightly Business Report
- Brian Lamb (Purdue, 1963): founder and host of C-SPAN, and Presidential Medal of Freedom recipient
- Dan Mangan (University of British Columbia, 2005), Juno Award-winning singer/songwriter
- Paul McDonald (Auburn), musician; American Idol season 10
- Bob McGrath (Michigan, 1954); played Bob on Sesame Street
- Seth Meyers (Northwestern University, 1996): cast member and head writer of Saturday Night Live, host of Late Night with Seth Meyers
- Ralph Morgan (Columbia, 1904): actor; co-founder, charter member and first president of the Screen Actors Guild
- Luis Moro (Rutgers University 1987), actor, filmmaker, writer, best known for the film Love and Suicide
- Cory Morrow (Texas Tech, 1990): country singer/songwriter
- Dermot Mulroney (Northwestern University, 1985): actor known for My Best Friend's Wedding, The Wedding Date, and The Family Stone
- Dave Revsine (Northwestern University, 1991): sportscaster for ESPN
- Rob Riggle (University of Kansas): actor, comedian, The Hangover, The Daily Show with Jon Stewart, and Saturday Night Live
- John Ritter (Southern California, 1970): actor, Three's Company, Hearts Afire and 8 Simple Rules for Dating My Teenage Daughter
- Morgan Spurlock (NYU, 1993): independent movie director, creator of Super Size Me
- McLean Stevenson (Northwestern University, 1948): Actor, M*A*S*H.
- Duke Tumatoe (Illinois, 1969): former guitarist for REO Speedwagon

== Law ==
- Robert Bork (University of Chicago): Judge of the United States Court of Appeals for the District of Columbia Circuit, 1982–1988; United States Attorney General, October 20, 1973 – December 17, 1973
- Neil M. Gorsuch (Columbia, 1988): judge for the United States Court of Appeals for the Tenth Circuit; Justice, Supreme Court of the United States, 2017
- Frank Iacobucci (British Columbia, 1962): former Justice, Supreme Court of Canada
- Byron White (University of Colorado, 1938); College Football Hall of Fame; United States Supreme Court Justice, and Presidential Medal of Freedom recipient
- Mark Massa (Indiana University, 1983): Associate Justice of the Indiana Supreme Court

== Literature and journalism ==
- Ken Blanchard (Cornell, 1961): management consultant; author of The One Minute Manager
- Will Cuppy (Chicago, 1907): humorist, author of The Decline and Fall of Practically Everybody
- Thomas A. Desjardin (Florida State, 1986): author and Civil War scholar
- Douglas Southall Freeman (University of Richmond, 1904): winner of the Pulitzer Prize for Biography in 1935 for R. E. Lee and 1958 for George Washington, Volumes I – VI
- John Gottschalk (Nebraska, 1965), chief executive officer and publisher of the Omaha World-Herald and was the national president of the Boy Scouts of America
- David Hall (Tennessee, 1965): awarded the Pulitzer Prize along with the Denver Post in 1986 for in-depth reporting on missing children.
- Otto Harbach (Knox): lyricist and librettist of nearly 50 musical comedies and operettas
- Haynes B. Johnson (Missouri, 1952): winner of the Pulitzer Prize 1966 for his work in the Washington Evening Star covering the civil rights crisis in Selma, Alabama
- Jack Kerouac (Columbia): author
- Ross Lockridge Jr. (Indiana, 1935): novelist, author of Raintree County
- Charles Gilman Norris: novelist
- Frank Norris (California, 1894): journalist and novelist, author of The Octopus: A Story of California and McTeague
- Tom Peters (Cornell University, 1964): author of In Search of Excellence
- Maurice Thompson: novelist, poet, and Indiana State Legislature
- Lew Wallace (Depauw, 1868) author of Ben-Hur: A Tale of the Christ, Union general in the American Civil War, governor of the New Mexico Territory, diplomat
- E. B. White (Cornell, 1921): novelist, author of Charlotte's Web and Stuart Little, winner of the Pulitzer Prize in 1978 under Special Awards and Citations, and Presidential Medal of Freedom recipient
- D. Harlan Wilson (Wittenberg University, 1993): author and professor
- Robert U. Woodward (Yale, 1965): assistant managing editor of The Washington Post; awarded the Pulitzer Prize along with the entire staff of the Washington Post in 1973 for coverage of the Watergate crisis

== Military ==
- Sidney Johnson Brooks Jr. (Texas, 1918 and Kansas, 1919): namesake of Brooks Air Force Base in San Antonio
- Clovis E. Byers (Ohio State, 1921): United States Army major general, Chief of Staff, Eighth US Army.
- Tedford H. Cann (CCNY, 1920): champion American swimmer and a recipient the Medal of Honor Seaman, USN
- Marcellus H. Chiles (Colorado College, 1916): recipient of the Medal of Honor; Captain, USA
- William J. Crowe (Oklahoma, 1946): United States Navy admiral, Chairman of the Joint Chiefs of Staff (1985–1989); Ambassador to Great Britain.
- George Decker (Lafayette, 1924): United States Army general, Chief of Staff, United States Army (1960–1962).
- Robert L. Eichelberger (Ohio State, 1907): United States Army general, superintendent of West Point; commander of the Eighth US Army in the South West Pacific theater in World War II.
- Bruce K. Holloway (Tennessee, 1933): United States Air Force general, member and commander of the Flying Tigers, commanded USAFE, Vice Chief of Staff, USAF and Commander-in-Chief of Strategic Air Command.
- LeRoy P. Hunt (California, 1914): United States Marine Corps major general; Commander, 5th Marines at the battle of Guadalcanal
- Albert G. Jenkins (Jefferson College, 1848): Confederate Cavalry Brigade General and delegate to the first Confederate Congress.
- George H. Ramer (Bucknell, 1950): recipient of the Medal of Honor; 2nd Lieutenant, USMC Reserve
- Robert D. Reilly Jr. (Washington, 1975): United States Navy RADM; commander of Military Sealift Command; former Commander of USS Harry S. Truman (CVN 75) Carrier Strike Group
- Jack L. Rives (Georgia, 1974): Lt. Gen. Rives was The Judge Advocate General (TJAG), Headquarters U.S. Air Force, Washington, D.C. and former Executive Director of the American Bar Association
- Harry Alexander Smith (Kansas State, 1886), US Army major general

== Politics ==
- Victor G. Atiyeh (Oregon, 1945): former Governor of Oregon
- Newton D. Baker (Johns Hopkins, 1892): former Secretary of War
- Alphonzo E. Bell Jr. (Occidental, 1938): U.S. House of Representatives
- Calvin Coolidge (Amherst, 1895): 30th President of the United States of America and 29th Vice President of the United States
- William J. Crowe Jr. (Oklahoma, 1946): former Chairman of the Joint Chiefs of Staff; Ambassador to the United Kingdom, and Presidential Medal of Freedom recipient
- Charles A. Beard: history professor at Columbia University
- Mitch Daniels: former governor of Indiana and former president of Purdue University, West Lafayette, Indiana
- Ed Edmondson (Oklahoma, 1940): U.S. Representative from Oklahoma 1953-1973
- J. Howard Edmondson (Oklahoma, 1946): 16th Governor of Oklahoma; U.S. Senator from Oklahoma
- Charles W. Fairbanks (Ohio Wesleyan, 1872): 26th Vice President of the United States; namesake of Fairbanks, Alaska
- Julius Caldeen Gunter (University of Virginia): Governor of Colorado
- David Hall (Oklahoma, 1952): 20th Governor of Oklahoma
- Dave Hancock (University of Alberta, 1972): former Premier of Alberta
- Eric Holcomb (Hanover College, 1990): Governor of Indiana
- James Herron Hopkins (Jefferson College): U.S. House of Representatives
- John N. Hostettler (Rose–Hulman Institute of Technology, 1983): former U.S. House of Representatives
- Bob Kerrey (Nebraska, 1965): U.S. Senator, Nebraska (1989–2001);Governor of Nebraska, Medal of Honor recipient USN Reserve SEAL Team
- Herbert H. Lehman (Williams College, 1899): Governor of New York, United States Senator, and Presidential Medal of Freedom recipient
- Thomas R. Marshall (Wabash, 1873): 28th Vice President of the United States
- Bob Mathias (Stanford, 1953): United States Congressman and two-time Olympic decathlon gold medalist (1948 and 1952)
- Robert S. McNamara (California, 1937): former United States Secretary of Defense and Presidential Medal of Freedom recipient
- William Yoast Morgan (University of Kansas, 1885): Lieutenant Governor of Kansas
- Meredith Nicholson: novelist, United States Minister to Nicaragua, United States Minister to Venezuela, and United States Minister to Paraguay
- Frank O'Bannon (Indiana, 1952): former Governor of Indiana
- Mike Pence (Hanover College, 1981): Vice President of the United States of America; Governor of Indiana; United States House of Representatives
- Jared Polis (Princeton University, 1996): Governor of Colorado; U.S. House of Representatives
- Jim Prentice (University of Alberta, 1976): former Premier of Alberta; former Minister within the federal Canadian cabinet
- Donald Randall Richberg (University of Chicago, 1901): head of the National Recovery Administration
- Joseph H. Thompson (Pittsburgh, 1905): Pennsylvania state senator, head football coach of the University of Pittsburgh Panthers, and College Football Hall of Fame inductee, recipient of the Medal of Honor; Major, USA
- Maurice Thompson: novelist, poet, and Indiana State Legislature
- Charles Thone (University of Nebraska): former Governor of Nebraska
- Zebulan Vance (University of North Carolina), Governor of North Carolina, United States Senate
- Lew Wallace (Depauw, 1868) Union general in the American Civil War, governor of the New Mexico Territory, diplomat, and author of Ben-Hur: A Tale of the Christ

== Religion ==
- Edmond Browning (Sewanee, 1952): 24th Presiding Bishop and Primate of the Episcopal Church in the United States of America
- William Fraser McDowell (Ohio Wesleyan): Bishop of the Methodist Episcopal Church
- William Edward McLaren (Jefferson College): Bishop of Chicago (formerly Illinois) in the Episcopal Church
- Norman Vincent Peale (Ohio Wesleyan, 1920): theologian; author of The Power of Positive Thinking, and Presidential Medal of Freedom recipient

== Science and medicine ==
- Luis Walter Alvarez (Chicago, 1932): Nobel Prize winner, Physics, 1968.
- Eugene Cernan (Purdue, 1956): astronaut, Gemini and Apollo space programs; last man to walk on the Moon
- Malcolm Renfrew (Idaho, 1932): polymer chemist, Teflon development
- Frederick Chapman Robbins (Missouri, 1936): awarded, along with two other colleagues, the 1954 Nobel Prize in Physiology or Medicine
- Jack Swigert (Colorado, 1953): astronaut, Apollo program, and Presidential Medal of Freedom recipient

== Sports ==
- Roone Arledge (Columbia, 1952), United States Olympic Hall of Fame
- Chuck Armstrong (Purdue, 1964): President and COO of the Seattle Mariners
- Francis "Reds" Bagnell (Pennsylvania, 1951): College Football Hall of Fame inducted 1977
- Sal Bando (Arizona State, 1966): professional baseball player with the Kansas City Athletics, Oakland Athletics, Milwaukee Brewers; General Manager of the Milwaukee Brewers
- Ormond Beach (Kansas, 1933), Canadian Football Hall of Fame
- Clay Bennett (Oklahoma, 1981): Chairman of the Professional Basketball Club; owner of the Oklahoma City Thunder professional basketball team; billionaire
- Eric Bjornson (Washington, 1994), professional football player with the Dallas Cowboys, Super Bowl XXX (won) (1995)
- Tom Brookshier (University of Colorado, 1953): Professional Football Player, Jersey #40 retired by Philadelphia Eagles (1953–1961); 1960 National Football League championship and later teamed with Pat Summerall as CBS's No. 1 professional football broadcasting duo, Super Bowl (won) (1960) (before AFL–NFL merger)
- Howard Cann (NYU, 1918), Basketball Hall of Fame
- John Cappelletti (Penn State 1974): Professional football player; winner of the Heisman Trophy; member of the College Football Hall of Fame
- Clifford Carlson (Pittsburgh, 1918), Basketball Hall of Fame
- Keith Carney (University of Maine, 1991): professional hockey player for Buffalo Sabres, Chicago Blackhawks, Phoenix Coyotes, Anaheim Ducks, Vancouver Canucks, and the Minnesota Wild
- Skip Caray (Missouri, 1961): Announcer, Atlanta Braves
- Jimmy Cefalo (Penn State, 1978): professional football player with the Miami Dolphins Super Bowl XVII (lost) (1983) and Super Bowl XIX (lost) (1985)
- Earl "Dutch" Clark (Colorado College, 1933): Pro Football Hall of Fame inducted 1963
- Meredith Colket (University of Pennsylvania), 1901 B.S., 1904 LL.B, Olympic silver medal winner in the pole vault at the 1900 Summer Olympics
- Morgan Cox (University of Tennessee, Knoxville, 2010): professional football player with the Baltimore Ravens Super Bowl XLVII (won) (2012)
- Billy Cundiff (Drake University, 2002): Professional football player, Dallas Cowboys, Tampa Bay Buccaneers, Green Bay Packers, New Orleans Saints, Baltimore Ravens, Cleveland Browns
- Wes Cutler (Toronto, 1933), Canadian Football Hall of Fame
- Riki Ellison (Southern California, 1982): professional football player with the San Francisco 49ers Super Bowl XIX (won) (1985); Super Bowl XXIII (won) (1989); and, Super Bowl XXIV (won) (1990)
- William Beattie Feathers (Tennessee, 1934): College Football Hall of Fame inducted 1955
- Tim Finchem (Richmond, 1969): PGA Tour commissioner
- Tim Foley (Purdue 1969): professional football player with the Miami Dolphins Super Bowl VI (won) (1972), Super Bowl VII (won) (1973), and Super Bowl V (lost)(1971)
- Tony Gabriel (Syracuse, 1971), Canadian Football Hall of Fame
- Brian Griese (Michigan, 1997): professional football player with the Denver Broncos, Miami Dolphins, Tampa Bay Buccaneers, and Chicago Bears; played with the Denver Broncos Super Bowl XXXIII (won) (1999)
- Charles W. "Chic" Harley (Ohio State, 1919): College Football Hall of Fame inducted in the first class, 1951
- E. J. Holub (Texas Tech, 1961): professional football player, Dallas Texans/Kansas City Chiefs; AFL All-Star, and College Football Hall of Fame, and played with the Kansas City Chiefs Super Bowl I(lost) (1967) and Super Bowl IV (won) (in 1970)
- Mike Huff (Northwestern University, 1985): professional baseball player with the Los Angeles Dodgers, Cleveland Indians, Chicago White Sox, and Toronto Blue Jays
- Marcus Hurley (Columbia, 1908), United States Bicycling Hall of Fame
- Chuck Hyatt (Pittsburgh, 1930), Basketball Hall of Fame
- Hale Irwin (Colorado, 1967): professional golfer; member of the World Golf Hall of Fame
- Bob Konovsky (Wisconsin, 1956), National Wrestling Hall of Fame
- Ron Lancaster (Wittenberg, 1960), Canadian Football Hall of Fame
- Myles Lane (Dartmouth, 1928): College Football Hall of Fame, inducted 1970
- Mark Loretta (Northwestern University, 1993): professional baseball player with the Los Angeles Dodgers, Milwaukee Brewers, Houston Astros, San Diego Padres, and Boston Red Sox; winner of the Hutch Award
- Christy Mathewson (Bucknell, 1902): professional baseball player; member of the Baseball Hall of Fame
- Bob Mathias (Stanford, 1953): two-time Olympic decathlon gold medalist (1948 and 1952); United States Congressman, and United States Olympic Hall of Fame
- Tom Matte (Ohio State, 1961): professional football player with the Baltimore Colts Super Bowl III (lost) (1969) and Super Bowl V (won) (1971)
- Gene McEver (Tennessee, 1931):College Football Hall of Fame, inducted 1954
- Hugh Millen (Washington, 1986): professional football player with the Los Angeles Rams, Atlanta Falcons, New England Patriots, and Denver Broncos
- William K. Morrill Jr. (Johns Hopkins, 1959), National Lacrosse Hall of Fame
- Jack Nicklaus (Ohio State, 1961): professional golfer; World Golf Hall of Fame, and Presidential Medal of Freedom recipient
- Peter O'Malley (University of Pennsylvania): former president and owner of the Los Angeles Dodgers
- Jerry Pate (Alabama, 1974): professional golfer; winner, 1976 U.S. Open
- Clancy Pendergast (University of Arizona, 1990): NFL and NCAA football coach
- Roger Penske (Lehigh, 1959): co-founder of Championship Auto Racing Teams (CART); owner of Penske Racing; winner of 15 Indianapolis 500s and 9 CART points titles; billionaire
- Mike Peplowski (Michigan State University, 1993): NBA basketball player for the Sacramento Kings and Detroit Pistons
- Bobby Rahal (Denison University, 1975): race car driver; winner of the Indianapolis 500
- William Reid (Colgate, 1918), Basketball Hall of Fame
- Les Richter (California @ Berkeley, 1952): College Football Hall of Fame inducted 1982
- Greg Schiano (Bucknell, 1988): head coach, Tampa Bay Buccaneers football team
- William C. Schmeisser (Johns Hopkins, 1902), National Lacrosse Hall of Fame
- Howell Scobey (Lehigh, 1936), National Wrestling Hall of Fame
- Denny Shute (Western Reserve 1927): professional golfer; member of the World Golf Hall of Fame
- Dean Smith (Kansas, 1953): former North Carolina Tar Heels men's basketball coach; member of the Basketball Hall of Fame
- Rufus Smith: professional baseball player for the Detroit Tigers
- Bill Snyder (William Jewell, 1963): former Kansas State Wildcats football coach; member of the College Football Hall of Fame
- Robert Steele (North Alabama, 1977): professional football player with the Dallas Cowboys Super Bowl XII (won) (1978)
- Payne Stewart (Southern Methodist, 1979): professional golfer; member of the World Golf Hall of Fame
- Matt Suhey (Penn State, 1980): professional football player with the Chicago Bears Super Bowl XX (won) (1986)
- Edwin Sweetland (Cornell, 1899): first salaried basketball coach of the Kentucky Wildcats; head football coach at Syracuse, Ohio State, Colgate, Kentucky, Miami University, West Virginia, and Tulane
- Joseph H. Thompson (Pittsburgh, 1905): Pennsylvania state senator, head football coach of the University of Pittsburgh Panthers, and College Football Hall of Fame inductee, recipient of the Medal of Honor; Major
- Oswald Tower (Williams, 1907), Basketball Hall of Fame
- Bake Turner (Texas Tech, 1962): professional football player with the New York Jets Super Bowl III (won) (1969)
- Roger Wehrli (Missouri, 1968): College Football Hall of Fame inducted 2003 and Pro Football Hall of Fame inducted 2007
- Byron R. White (University of Colorado, 1938), College Football Hall of Fame
- Percy Williams (British Columbia, 1928): Olympic sprinter; gold medalist
- Matthew Wolff (Oklahoma State 2018); PGA golfer
- Tom Yawkey (Yale University, 1925): owner, Boston Red Sox, member of the Baseball Hall of Fame
