= Antonio Macia =

American screenwriter and actor

- Born: Stamford, Connecticut
- Education: Middlebury College
- Occupations: Screenwriter, actor

Antonio Macia is an American screenwriter and actor. The son of Argentine and Chilean immigrants, Antonio was born and raised in Stamford, Connecticut. He graduated from Middlebury College with a degree in International Studies. He then served a two-year mission for the Church of Jesus Christ of Latter-day Saints in Toronto, Ontario, Canada where he worked with Hispanic communities.

In 2002, Macia wrote and co-starred in his first feature film, Anne B. Real. The film was nominated for two Independent Spirit Awards.

Macia wrote the screenplay for the 2010 film Holy Rollers.

== Filmography ==
Year	Title	Notes
2020	Blackjack: The Jackie Ryan Story	Screenwriter
2010	Holy Rollers	Screenwriter
2009	2k3	Actor
2003	Anne B. Real	Screenwriter, actor
