= Holy Rollers (film) =

- Theatrical poster
- Directed by: Kevin Asch
- Written by: Antonio Macia
- Produced by: Danny A. Abeckaser; Tory Tunnell; Per Melita; Jen Gatien
- Starring: Jesse Eisenberg; Justin Bartha; Ari Graynor; Danny A. Abeckaser; Q-Tip
- Cinematography: Ben Kutchins
- Edited by: Suzanne Spangler
- Music by: MJ Mynarski
- Distributed by: First Independent Pictures
- Release dates: January 25, 2010 (Sundance); May 21, 2010 (United States)
- Running time: 89 minutes
- Country: United States
- Language: English

Holy Rollers is a 2010 American independent crime drama film directed by Kevin Asch and written by Antonio Macia. It stars Jesse Eisenberg, Justin Bartha, Ari Graynor, Danny A. Abeckaser and Q-Tip. The film is inspired by a true story of a young Hasidic man who was lured into the world of international drug trafficking in the late 1990s.

== Plot ==
In 1998, Sam Gold is a mild-mannered 20-year-old Orthodox Jewish man who lives with his large family in the Borough Park section of Brooklyn. Sam works in his father Mendel's fabric store while studying to be a rabbi. He and his family hope to arrange a marriage for him with Zeldy Lazar. However, Sam's family is much poorer than the Lazars, and he worries he will be unable to provide for them.

Sam and his best friend Leon accept a mysterious job offer from Leon's brother Yosef and his boss, the Israeli Jackie. Under the auspices of visiting a rabbi in Atlantic City, Yosef sends them to Amsterdam, with instructions to wait for him. While there, the pair are given a briefcase, which Yosef says contains medicine, and are instructed to walk it through customs in New York. Back in New York, after a comment from Maxim, Yosef's muscle, the pair discover the briefcase contains pure ecstasy. Leon wants nothing more to do with Yosef or his operation, but Sam is attracted to the easy money and decides to continue.

Sam becomes a participant in Jackie's operation, making trips to Amsterdam to pick up suitcases. He is paid to recruit other young Orthodox Jews as mules, who implicitly trust him as one of their own. Sam meets the liberal Jewish girl Rachel, Jackie's girlfriend, and drinks alcohol and takes ecstasy with the gang. When Sam brokers a business deal with European drug manufacturer Ephraim that Jackie almost abandoned, his influence in the organisation grows, as does his relationships with Yosef and Rachel, who both take interest in him.

Meanwhile, Sam slowly leaves the yeshiva. His new job, which he originally covered up as legal importing of medicine, is well-known around his neighborhood, and his parents, fearing their family's reputation in the community, kick him out of the house. Sam discovers Yosef has been skimming money from Jackie through side deals, which Sam, fearing the repercussions, objects to. After escaping a failed deal, Sam goes to meet Jackie, who promptly leaves for a meeting at a nightclub. While alone, Rachel attempts to seduce Sam and encourage him to run away with her, but fails to do so.

Jackie, in a meeting with Ephraim and Sam, wants to ship street ecstasy, which contains a higher percentage of other drugs, into America. When Sam voices his objections, Jackie rebuffs him, leading him to have an argument with Rachel. Sam attempts to convince Rachel to escape to Lithuania, but Rachel, having changed her mind about Sam, refuses. Sam then decides to continue with the operation despite the added risk; these drugs, carried by unwitting young Orthodox Jews, are picked up by drug-sniffing dogs and the mules are arrested.

Sam, who no longer dresses like an Orthodox Jew, is not checked at customs with the mules and manages to escape. He goes to warn Yosef, who is high at a nightclub. Yosef suggests they drive to the West Coast to lie low with his cousin. Sam, not willing to go with Yosef's plan, returns to his childhood home in a panic. He is greeted there by Leon, now married to Zeldy and studying to become a rabbi as Sam was once intended to. Sam, realising that he will be arrested, weeps on his front steps as the sirens in the distance grow closer, until a police car pulls up.

In the epilogue, it is revealed that Sam and his Orthodox mules received 28 months in a federal boot camp, where they became informants of Jackie and Yosef's operation. Over six months between 1998 and 1999, the operation managed to smuggle over one million ecstasy pills to America, via Sam and the other mules. Jackie and Yosef receive 16 years in prison on drug conspiracy charges, while Rachel also receives a year for participation. Sam and Mendel are then seen walking and talking during a visitation, implying that Sam has reunited with his family.

== Cast ==
- Jesse Eisenberg as Sam Gold
- Justin Bartha as Yosef Zimmerman
- Ari Graynor as Rachel
- Danny A. Abeckaser as Jackie Solomon
- Q-Tip as Ephraim
- Jason Fuchs as Leon Zimmerman
- Mark Ivanir as Mendel Gold
- Hallie Eisenberg as Ruth Gold
- Elizabeth Marvel as Elka Gold
- David Vadim as Maxim
- Bern Cohen as Rebbe

== Production ==
In preparation for the film, Jesse Eisenberg, who was raised in a secular Jewish household, spent time at Lubavitch in Brooklyn, where he became bar mitzvah, and read books about Hasidic life.

Director Kevin Asch said he chose film's title Holy Rollers to reference both the protagonist's religious character and the slang term "rolling", which means to be high on ecstasy.

== Reception ==
=== Critical reception ===
As of June 2020, the film holds a 52% approval rating on review aggregator website Rotten Tomatoes, based on 90 reviews with an average rating of 5.44/10. The website's critical consensus reads, "Despite a promising premise and a solid central performance from Jesse Eisenberg, Holy Rollers lacks the depth necessary to overcome its cliched script." On Metacritic, the film has a weighted average score of 51 out of 100, based on 23 critics, indicating "mixed or average reviews".

In a review that awarded 3 stars out of 5, Peter Bradshaw of The Guardian wrote the film is a "breathless, enjoyable comedy-thriller" and that Eisenberg is able to lose his "incarnation as Facebook evil genius Mark Zuckerberg."

Mike Hale of The New York Times wrote "Mr. Eisenberg and particularly Mr. Bartha give appropriately twitchy, live-wire performances, and the film tells its basically bleak story lucidly and with touches of dark humor", but said the film feels too familiar to similar films with a "striving-immigrant success story and the cautionary drug tragedy", like Mean Streets and Maria Full of Grace.

Justin Chang of Variety said "while Asch spends considerable time at the outset detailing the habits and traditions of Orthodox Jewish life, there’s not a clear enough sense of what it all means to Sam personally for his betrayal to carry the sting it should." Neil Miller of Film School Rejects criticized the film as "uninspired and formulaic." Writing for HuffPost, Jessica Pilot said the film "feels like it was written by extracting a Yiddish dictionary of every Jewish cliche and folksy latke reference. The story comes as an afterthought."

Actor Luzer Twersky publicly criticized the film and argued its depiction of Hasidic Jews, such as the accents and traditions, were not accurate. The film also received criticism for not hiring a Hasidic or ex-Hasidic consultant to achieve accuracy in its depiction.

=== Awards and nominations ===
Holy Rollers was nominated for the Grand Jury Prize at the 2010 Sundance Film Festival and director Kevin Asch won the Breakthrough Director Award at the 2010 Gotham Awards.

Holy Rollers also won the Cartier Revelation prize for most promising newcomer at the Deauville Film Festival.

The end credit song "Darkness Before the Dawn", written by MJ Mynarski and Paul Comaskey, appeared on the Best Original Song shortlist for the 83rd Academy Awards.
