= Danny Lux =

American composer (born 1969)

Daniel Scott Lux (born June 5, 1969) is an American music composer who has created music for television and film productions.

He has been credited in many movies including Halloween: Resurrection and Stolen Summer (both 2002). His TV series' credits include the theme music for Sliders, Million Dollar Mysteries, Crisis Center (first Emmy nomination), Profiler (second Emmy nomination), and Boston Legal. Additional series to which Lux has contributed music include My Name Is Earl (with Mark Leggett), Boston Legal, Grey's Anatomy, Karen Sisco, Hack, Ally McBeal (one BMI win), Boston Public, NYPD Blue (two BMI wins, both shared with Mike Post), John Doe, Sabrina, the Teenage Witch, The Good Wife, Melrose Place, Dawson's Creek, Suits, Magic's Biggest Secrets Finally Revealed, Robotica, Mistresses, and Manifest.

Lux wrote an instrumental theme for Ally (a spin-off of Ally McBeal) and the theme for The Bachelor with John Carta.
