= Halloween: Resurrection =

2002 film by Rick Rosenthal

- Theatrical release poster
- Directed by: Rick Rosenthal
- Screenplay by: Larry Brand; Sean Hood
- Story by: Larry Brand
- Based on: Characters Created by Debra Hill; John Carpenter
- Produced by: Paul Freeman
- Starring: Busta Rhymes; Bianca Kajlich; Thomas Ian Nicholas; Ryan Merriman; Sean Patrick Thomas; Tyra Banks; Jamie Lee Curtis
- Cinematography: David Geddes
- Edited by: Robert A. Ferretti
- Music by: Danny Lux
- Production companies: Nightfall Productions; Trancas International Films
- Distributed by: Dimension Films
- Release date: July 12, 2002
- Running time: 90 minutes
- Country: United States
- Language: English
- Budget: $15 million
- Box office: $37.6 million

Halloween: Resurrection is a 2002 American slasher film directed by Rick Rosenthal from a screenplay written by Larry Brand and Sean Hood. It is the sequel to Halloween H20: 20 Years Later (1998) and the eighth installment of the Halloween franchise. It stars Busta Rhymes, Bianca Kajlich, Thomas Ian Nicholas, Ryan Merriman, Sean Patrick Thomas, Tyra Banks, and Jamie Lee Curtis, with Brad Loree as Michael Myers. This was the final installment of the H20 timeline of the Halloween franchise, which had just been rebooted with the previous film in 1998, before it was rebooted again in 2007 with a remake and again in 2018. The film follows Myers continuing his murderous rampage in his hometown of Haddonfield when his childhood house is used for a live internet horror show.

Halloween: Resurrection was released by Dimension Films on July 12, 2002, and was critically panned, with critics considering it an unnecessary sequel to Halloween H20 and deeming it to be one of the worst films in the Halloween franchise. Although the film is technically a box office success, grossing $37.6 million worldwide against a $15 million budget, it was considered an underperformance at the box office, in contrast to its predecessor earning $75 million. The next film in the franchise was a 2007 remake of the 1978 film directed by Rob Zombie.

== Plot ==
Three years after the murders at Hillcrest Academy, (Note: As depicted in Halloween H20: 20 Years Later (1998)) a guilt-ridden Laurie Strode is institutionalized in Grace Andersen Sanitarium. It is revealed that the person she previously decapitated, whom she believed to be Michael Myers, was in fact a paramedic that Michael had switched clothes with and rendered mute. Anticipating her brother's inevitable return, Laurie sets a trap on the sanitarium's roof.

Michael kills two security guards and chases Laurie to the rooftop, where her trap works and temporarily incapacitates Michael. However, Laurie's fears of killing the wrong person again get the better of her. When she attempts to remove his mask to confirm his identity, Michael stabs and throws her off the rooftop to her alleged death.

A year later, college students Sara Moyer, Bill Woodlake, Donna Chang, Jen Danzig, Jim Morgan and Rudy Grimes win a competition to appear on an Internet reality show called Dangertainment, directed by Freddie Harris and Nora Winston. The students have to spend a night in Michael's abandoned childhood house in order to figure out what led him to kill. However, while setting up cameras throughout the house in preparation for the show, cameraman Charlie is killed by Michael, who has returned to Haddonfield. On Halloween night, equipped with head cameras, Sara, Bill, Donna, Jen, Jim, and Rudy enter the house and separate into three groups to search for clues. While Sara messages the others, Myles "Deckard" Barton watches the live broadcast during a party. During the search, Michael suddenly appears and kills Bill.

Donna and Jim discover a wall filled with fake corpses and realize that the show is a setup, before the former is killed by Michael. At the party, Deckard and other partygoers witness the murder; only Deckard realizes that it was real. Meanwhile, Freddie enters the house dressed as Michael in order to scare the competitors. He is followed by the real Michael, whom he mistakes for Charlie and shoos out of the house towards the garage where Nora is. When Rudy, Sara, and Jim find Freddie in the Michael costume, he reveals the scheme to them and begs them to cooperate, telling them that they will all be paid well if the show works out. After Freddie leaves, the trio decides to gather up the rest and leave. Jen discovers Bill's corpse, and Michael decapitates her in front of Rudy, Sara, and Jim, who soon realize that it isn't Freddie. Michael proceeds to kill Jim and Rudy before chasing Sara upstairs.

Locking herself in a bedroom, Sara begs Deckard to help her. As the other partygoers realize that all the murders are real, Deckard begins to message Michael's locations to Sara to help her avoid him. Sara runs into Freddie just as Michael finds them and stabs the latter. Sara runs into the tunnels and finds an exit leading to the garage, where she discovers Nora's body (Note: Nora's death is featured as a deleted scene in home media releases of the film.). Michael again arrives and attacks Sara, but a still-living Freddie finds them and fights Michael as an electrical fire starts in the garage. After electrocuting Michael, Freddie carries Sara to safety, leaving Michael to die in the burning garage. Later, Freddie and Sara are interviewed by the local news, during which Sara thanks Deckard for saving her life and Freddie assaults the reporter. Meanwhile, Michael is presumed dead and his body is taken to the morgue. However, as the coroner prepares to examine his body, Michael suddenly awakens.

In an alternate ending, Sara requests to look at the bodybag seemingly containing Michael's corpse. Upon opening, Michael awakens and chokes Freddie until Sara kills Michael by stabbing him in the face with an axe.

== Cast ==
- Jamie Lee Curtis as Laurie Strode
- Brad Loree as Michael Myers
- Busta Rhymes as Freddie Harris
- Bianca Kajlich as Sara Moyer
- Sean Patrick Thomas as Rudy Grimes
- Daisy McCrackin as Donna Chang
- Katee Sackhoff as Jennifer 'Jen' Danzig
- Luke Kirby as Jim Morgan
- Thomas Ian Nicholas as Bill Woodlake
- Ryan Merriman as Myles 'Deckard' Barton
- Tyra Banks as Nora Winston
- Gus Lynch as Harold Trumble
- Lorena Gale as Nurse Wells
- Marisa Rudiak as Nurse Phillips
- Brent Chapman as Franklin Munroe
- Dan Joffre as Willie Haines
- Haig Sutherland as Aron
- Brad Sihvon as Charlie Albans
- Rick Rosenthal as Professor Mixter

== Production ==
The writers of Halloween H20: 20 Years Later were left with a dilemma when Jamie Lee Curtis wanted to end the series, but Moustapha Akkad had a clause that legally wouldn't allow the writers to kill Michael Myers off. According to the Blu-ray released by Scream Factory, Curtis almost left the project just weeks before filming, until Kevin Williamson came up with the paramedic story line and presented it to Akkad. Curtis finally agreed to be a part of the film under the condition that no footage hinting toward a sequel would be presented by the film, and that the audience would believe that Michael was dead until the inevitable sequel was announced. Resurrection's first shot of Michael in the paramedic uniform was filmed the day after H20's principal photography ended, according to H20's editor, Patrick Lussier. Daniel Farrands, screenwriter of Halloween: The Curse of Michael Myers, unsuccessfully proposed Halloween 8: Lord of the Dead, which would have featured Laurie Strode as the main antagonist. Instead producer Paul Freeman brought in writer Larry Brand, with whom he shared an agent. Brand decided to repurpose a slasher concept he had conceived inspired by the rise of reality television, where a killer enters a house full of cameras and makes the viewer unsure if the murders were real or staged. Brand had pitched his script as Halloween: MichaelMyers.com, changed it to Halloween: Homecoming and then the producers picked the subtitle Resurrection as they wanted a title that let audiences know Michael Myers was alive. Brand's original ending had Michael left in the burning house, and when the firemen would arrive the next day they would find his inert body which would jump on them only to turn out to be a cadaveric spasm before Michael collapsed into ash. After an original draft by Ehren Kruger was rejected, Sean Hood was brought in to write a script based on Brand's work.

Both Whitney Ransick and Dwight H. Little were approached to direct the film but turned it down. Later Rick Rosenthal, the director of Halloween II, was chosen to direct. During the casting period of the film, producers considered Danielle Harris (who played Jamie Lloyd in Halloween 4: The Return of Michael Myers and Halloween 5: The Revenge of Michael Myers) for a role in the film. After the producers liked working with LL Cool J in H20 but he turned out to be more expensive for a second appearance, the role of Freddie was envisioned to be played by another rapper, with Coolio also auditioning before the casting of Busta Rhymes. Brand said both Rhymes and Tyra Banks were brought into the movie to make it more appealing to a Black audience. Bianca Kajlich's screams had to be dubbed in postproduction because of her inability to scream. The film's trailer was delivered on April 26, 2002, with the release of Jason X. Principal photography began in Vancouver, British Columbia on May 14, 2001 with the opening scene filmed at Riverview Hospital in Coquitlam, BC. Daisy McCrackin's character Donna Chang was initially introduced through a shower scene, which was ultimately deleted from the finished film. It was meant to be a "sexy homage" to the infamous shower scene in Alfred Hitchcock's Psycho.

=== Music ===
The score for Halloween: Resurrection was composed by Danny Lux. The score incorporates electro-acoustic instrumentation with roots in synthesizer-heavy scores of the early 1980s. The film also features several rap and hip-hop songs.

In direct contrast to general critical reviews of the film, some assessments of its sound and theme music have been praising. For example, critic Steve Newton complimented the film's "creepy" and "unsettling" revival of the original iconic theme, while criticizing the film itself, as well as the rap tracks included.

== Home media ==
Halloween: Resurrection was released on VHS and DVD on December 10, 2002, which includes a web cam special using as found footage featuring the film's characters are set inside of Michael Myers' haunted house with alternate and deleted scenes.

In 2005, Dimension was sold by Disney, with Disney then selling off the parent label Miramax in 2010. Miramax and the rights to the pre-October 2005 library of Dimension were subsequently taken over by private equity firm Filmyard Holdings that same year. Filmyard sublicensed Halloween: Resurrection's Blu-ray home video rights to Shout! Factory (under their Scream Factory label), who released it on Blu-ray on September 23, 2014. They also sublicensed the DVD home video rights to Echo Bridge Entertainment, who reissued it on DVD on April 17, 2012. Echo Bridge also reissued several other Dimension and Miramax films on home video around this time. Miramax was then taken over by Qatari company beIN Media Group during March 2016. In April 2020, ViacomCBS (now known as Paramount Skydance) acquired the rights to Miramax's library and Dimension's pre-October 2005 library, after buying a 49% stake in Miramax from beIN. Halloween: Resurrection was made available on their streaming service Paramount+, and in 2021, Paramount Home Entertainment reissued the film on DVD, along with many other Dimension/Miramax titles they had acquired. In 2022, the home video rights were again sublicensed to Scream Factory. On October 4, 2022, they released Halloween: Resurrection on 4K UHD, as part of a 4K/Blu-ray box set featuring two other Paramount-owned Halloween films (Halloween: The Curse of Michael Myers and Halloween H20: 20 Years Later).

== Reception ==
=== Box office ===
Halloween: Resurrection was released on July 12, 2002 in the US to moderate reception which did not change in its later international release. The film finished in fourth place in its opening weekend with $12.3 million, behind Reign of Fire, Road to Perdition, and Men in Black II. It went on to gross a total of $30.4 million domestically, and an additional $7.3 million overseas, for a worldwide total of $37.7 million; domestically, the film's approximate 5,233,524 ticket sales were down over 55% from the approximate 11,735,978 of its predecessor.

=== Critical response ===
On the review aggregator website Rotten Tomatoes, 10% of 71 critics' reviews are positive, with an average rating of 3.6/10. The website's consensus reads: "The only thing this tired slasher flick may resurrect is nostalgia for when the genre was still fresh and scary." Metacritic, which uses a weighted average, assigned the film a score of 19 out of 100, based on 17 critics, indicating "overwhelming dislike". Audiences polled by CinemaScore gave the film an average grade of "B+" on an A+ to F scale.

Dave Kehr of the New York Times said, "Spectators will indeed sit open-mouthed before the screen, not screaming but yawning." Peter Travers of Rolling Stone said, "Every sequel you skip will be two hours gained. Consider this review life-affirming." Joe Leydon of Variety said, "[Seems] even more uselessly redundant and shamelessly money-grubbing than most third-rate horror sequels."

In 2018, while promoting the sequel to the original 1978 film, John Carpenter revealed that he had seen Halloween: Resurrection stating, "I watched the one in that house, with all the cameras. Oh my god. Oh lord, god. And then the guy gives the speech at the end about violence. What the hell? Oh my lord. I couldn't believe."

== See also ==
- List of films set around Halloween
- List of films featuring surveillance
