= Luis Moro =

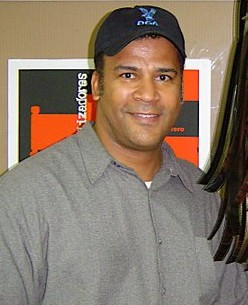
- Moro at The Havana Film Festival in Cuba 2003
- Born: January 2, 1964 (age 62); San Antonio de los Banos, Cuba
- Other name: Louie Moro
- Occupation: actor/producer/writer
- Website: morofilms.com

Luis Moro (born January 2, 1964) is a Cuban-born American actor, filmmaker, and writer. He first gained notability for co-writing, producing and acting in the film Anne B. Real, which was nominated for two Independent Spirit Award.

== Career ==
In 1991, Moro created and hosted the Real Estate America television series, which followed the format of news magazine shows but covered topics on real estate news. Moro worked in real estate and held a show for 10 years on the local TV station Univision, but in the last eight years he worked on film and stage productions across the country.

Moro received screen story by credit for his screenplay rewrites on Anne B. Real. He also co-wrote all the main hip-hop rap lyrics in the film performed by the lead character of Cynthia. After Anne B. Real, Moro produced three films, the southern drama The Unseen, Love and Suicide, a bilingual love story set in Havana, Cuba that was the first film shot by an American in Cuba since 1959, and Venus & Vegas, a buddy comedy set in Las Vegas.

Moro's other film projects include The Siege and King of the Ants. Moro also performs comedy.

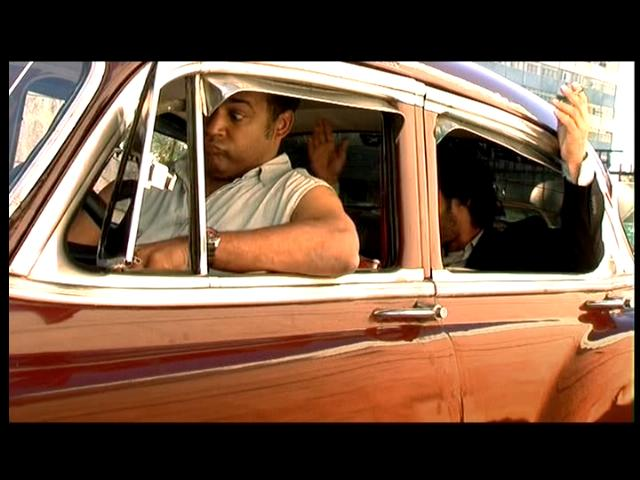
Moro in a scene from the 2005 film Love & Suicide

In 2008, Ben Kingsley's SBK-Pictures announced it would work with Moro to produce Whispers Like Thunder, a film about the Conley Sisters legal battle over the Wyandot National Burying Ground in Kansas. Kingsley agreed to play the role of Charles Curtis, the first and only Native American to become Vice President of the United States. The screenplay was written by Moro and Trip Brook.

== Political views ==
Moro has been active in promoting his political views on human rights. According to Vanessa Arrington of the Associated Press, "Cuban-American filmmaker Luis Moro expressed his disdain for the long-standing U.S. trade and travel restrictions against Cuba in a very public way: he made a movie there."

== Filmography ==
Television and film roles
Year	Title	Role	Notes
1991	Real Estate America	Host	Also creator and writer
1996	Lowball	Slick	
1998	The Siege	Hubbard FBI Decoy	
1999	For The Love of The Game	Detroit Tiger	
2001	Firestorm Rising	Marcus	
2001	3000 Miles to Graceland	FBI Agent	
2003	King of the Ants	Coach Garcia	Also stunt coordinator
2003	Anne B. Real	Tommy Morrel	Also producer and writer
2003	The Weather Report	Bob	Short film
2004	The Tollbooth		Consulting Producer
2005	Love & Suicide	Alberto	Also producer and writer
2005	The Unseen		Producer
2010	Venus & Vegas	Bathroom Bob	Producer
2015	Where We Begin		Consulting producer
2017	Roll With Me		Producer

== See also ==
- Cuban Americans
- Afro-Latinos
