= Bender (band) =

American rock band

Bender was an American post-grunge/alternative metal band that formed in Milwaukee, Wisconsin in 1994. They developed a large, dedicated fanbase on the strength of their notoriously rowdy, hard-drinking live performances, and the heavy local airplay of two early singles ("Headless Soldier" & “Lobster”). The band produced two independent albums: Joe released in 1995, and Jehovah's Hitlist in 1998. After being courted by several major record labels, they eventually signed a multi album deal with TVT Records. Jehovah's Hitlist was reworked and rereleased by TVT in May 2000. The band hit the road early that year supporting Queensryche, 3 Doors Down, Nickelback, Disturbed, Clutch, Union Underground, Sugar Ray, Tonic, Papa Roach, Chevelle, Great White and others. Off tour in early 2001, they began working on their follow-up release. When negotiations over the 2nd album broke down in late 2001, the band opted to leave TVT in an ultimately unsuccessful attempt to sign with another label.

Their more popular songs, "Isolate" and "Superfly", were featured on the game ATV Offroad Fury for PlayStation 2. “Superfly” also appears in Scary Movie and the PlayStation game MTV Sports: Pure Ride. The song "Angel Dust" appears in the movie 3000 Miles to Graceland. The unreleased track “Never Gonna Fly” is used briefly in National Lampoon's Van Wilder..

== Origins ==
Bender began with guitarist Matt Scerpella and bassist Tim Cook, who met in their late teens/early 20's. The two played together in various bands, performing a mix of cover and original material as they developed their songwriting. While experiencing some local success in the predominantly "metal" west side of the Milwaukee music scene with the band Slightly Sybil, they continued to stockpile songs for a future original project. During this process, they scoured the area for a singer that would best suit their vision and musical direction. They first heard Kent Boyce when his band, Silence in Eden, was featured on a Milwaukee radio show promoting local artists. Meeting him a few weeks later at a local charity show that both bands were playing, they invited him to sing on some early demo recordings. Those recording sessions quickly led to additional writing sessions, and Bender was formed. The band went through multiple drummers. The original drummer was Micah Havertape, who was active with the group in 1995. Jeff Holder was the band's second drummer and played with the group in 1998. Steve Adams joined in 1999 and became their permanent drummer. The band signed a contract with TVT Records in late 1999.

== Discography ==
=== Studio albums ===
Year	Album	Label
1995	Joe (Independent)	
1998	Jehovah's Hitlist (Independent)	
2000	Jehovah's Hitlist	TVT

=== Singles ===
Year	Song	Album
2000	"Superfly"	Jehovah's Hitlist
1995	"Headless Soldier"	Joe
1995	"Lobster"	Joe

== Personnel, members ==
- Kent Boyce – lead vocals
- Matt Scerpella – guitar
- Tim Cook – bass, backing vocals
- Micah Havertape (mentioned 1995) - drums
- Jeff Holder (mentioned 1998) - drums
- Steve Adams (1999-2002) – drums
