= Bill Erwin =

American actor (1914–2010)

- Erwin in Struck by Lightning, 1979
- Born: William Lindsey Erwin; December 2, 1914; Honey Grove, Texas, U.S.
- Died: December 29, 2010 (aged 96); Studio City, California, U.S.
- Other names: William Erwin; William L. Erwin
- Occupation: Actor
- Years active: 1941–2006
- Spouse: Fran MacLachlan (m. 1948; died 1995)
- Children: 4

Signature
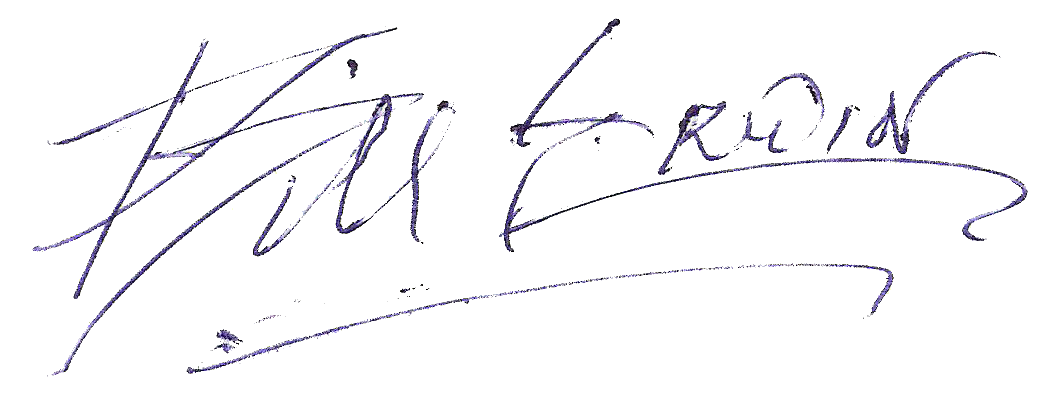

William Lindsey Erwin (December 2, 1914 – December 29, 2010) was an American actor with over 250 television and film credits. A veteran character actor, he is widely known for his 1993 Emmy Award–nominated performance on Seinfeld, portraying the embittered, irascible retiree Sid Fields. He also made notable appearances on shows such as I Love Lucy and Star Trek: The Next Generation. In cinema, his most recognized role is that of Arthur Biehl, a kindly bellman at the Grand Hotel, in Somewhere in Time (1980).

Erwin was a self-taught cartoonist, published in The New Yorker, Playboy, and Los Angeles. He won a Los Angeles Drama Critics Circle Award, four Drama-Logue Awards, Gilmore Brown Award for Career Achievement, Pacific Pioneer Broadcasters' Diamond Circle Award, and Distinguished Alumnus Award from Angelo State University.

== Early life ==
Erwin was born on December 2, 1914, in Honey Grove, Texas. He earned a bachelor's degree in journalism from the University of Texas at Austin and a master's in theater arts from California's Pasadena Playhouse. Erwin later served as a captain in the United States Army Air Forces during World War II.

== Career ==
=== Stage ===
Erwin acted in productions at the Pasadena Playhouse, the Laguna Beach Playhouse, the La Jolla Playhouse, and other venues in the Los Angeles area.

=== Film ===
In the late 1950s, Erwin was in such films as Man from Del Rio (1956) and The Night Runner (1957), before playing Jack Nicholson's father in The Cry Baby Killer, Nicholson's first starring role in 1958. The long out-of-print film was released on DVD on November 22, 2006. He had credited small roles in films such as The Christine Jorgensen Story (1970), How Awful About Allan (1970), Candy Stripe Nurses (1974) and Tarantulas: The Deadly Cargo (1977), before he co-starred alongside Christopher Reeve and Jane Seymour in the romantic fantasy Somewhere in Time (1980) as Arthur Biehl, the Grand Hotel's venerable bellman, and attended annual reunions of cast, crew, and fans of the cult classic at the Grand Hotel on Mackinac Island, Michigan.

Erwin also appeared in numerous films by John Hughes, with cameos in Planes, Trains and Automobiles (1987), She's Having a Baby (1988), Home Alone (1990) and Dennis the Menace (1993). In the latter two films, Hughes paired him with Billie Bird playing his wife. His later film career included roles in Invitation to Hell (1984), The Land Before Time (1988), Naked Gun 33 1/3: The Final Insult (1994), Things to Do in Denver When You're Dead (1995), Menno's Mind (1997), Chairman of the Board (1998), Forces of Nature (1999), Inferno (1999) and A Crack in the Floor (2001).

=== Television ===
Erwin's television credits were far more numerous in the 1950s, having appeared in such television series as I Love Lucy, Crusader, Trackdown, Colgate Theatre, Perry Mason and The Rifleman. In the 1960s, Erwin appeared in television series such as: The Andy Griffith Show, Mister Ed, Maverick, The Twilight Zone, 87th Precinct, My Three Sons, The Fugitive, Leave It to Beaver and Mannix. He played the Jury Foreman in The Wild Wild West (1967) S3 E12 "The Night of the Legion of Death".

In the 1970s, 1980s and 1990s, he appeared in Barnaby Jones, Cannon, Gunsmoke, Married... with Children, E/R, The Optimist, Highway to Heaven, Who's the Boss?, Growing Pains, Full House, The Golden Girls, Moonlighting, Star Trek: The Next Generation, Lois & Clark: The New Adventures of Superman and The Drew Carey Show.

Erwin also guest-starred in the Seinfeld episode ("The Old Man"), for which he received an Emmy Award nomination for outstanding guest actor in a comedy series, he played Sid Fields, who participates in the Foster-A-Grandpa Program, which pairs him with Jerry Seinfeld. Erwin's crotchety, aggressive, foul-mouthed character ensures that the relationship is doomed from the beginning. Erwin later reunited with Michael Richards when he guest-starred on the short-lived The Michael Richards Show. In the 2000s, Erwin appeared on Monk, The West Wing, The King of Queens, Everwood and My Name Is Earl.

=== Other media ===
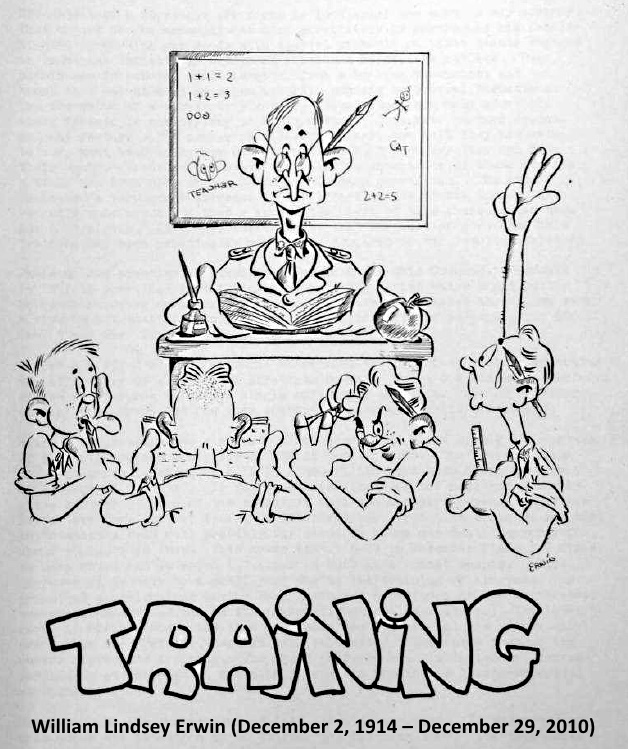
Bombing Manual

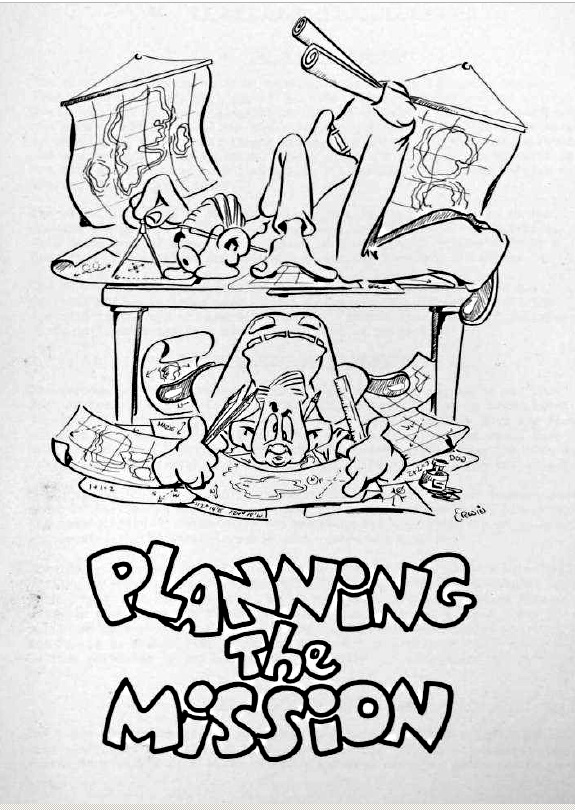
Planning the Mission

After Erwin began his theatrical career with the Laguna Beach and La Jolla playhouses in 1940, he worked as ventriloquist Edgar Bergen's stage manager for Bergen's 1941 tour of the country.

Due to his resemblance to William Gaines, Sam Viviano redid Erwin's character as Gaines in the MAD Magazine spoof of Home Alone where the married couple sells their ticket to Kate McAllister.

== Personal life ==
Erwin was married to actress and journalist Fran MacLachlan Erwin from 1948 to her death in 1995. They lived in the Hollywood Hills and had four children.

He was a devout Presbyterian and a staunch conservative Republican.

== Death ==
Erwin died from natural causes at his home in Studio City, California on December 29, 2010, aged 96.

== Filmography ==
=== Film ===
Film
Year	Title	Role	Notes
1941	Always Tomorrow: The Portrait of an American Business	Sam Tompkins	Uncredited
1941	You're in the Army Now	Soldier	Uncredited
1948	The Velvet Touch	Howard Forman	Credited as William Erwin
1949	Easy Living	Minor Role	Uncredited
1949	Battleground	Warrant Officer	Uncredited
1951	Double Dynamite	Minor Role	Uncredited
1952	Holiday for Sinners	Usher	Uncredited
1956	Man from Del Rio	Roy Higgens	Uncredited
1957	The Night Runner	McDermott	
1957	The Shadow on the Window	Policeman	Uncredited
1957	House of Numbers	Bank Teller	Uncredited
1957	Jet Pilot	Sergeant	Uncredited
1957	Witness for the Prosecution	Juror	Uncredited
1958	Gun Fever	Bartender	
1958	The Cry Baby Killer	Mr. Wallace	
1958	The Buccaneer	Civilian	Uncredited
1958	Teenage Challenge	Alton Conway	Short film
1962	Rome Adventure	Elderly Guest	Uncredited
1962	Terror at Black Falls	Hugh "Squint" Edwards	Credited as William L. Erwin
1963	Under the Yum Yum Tree	Teacher	Uncredited
1964	The Brass Bottle	Middle-Aged Man	Uncredited
1968	Counterpoint	Trumpet player	Uncredited
1970	The Christine Jorgensen Story	Pastor	
1974	Candy Stripe Nurses	Principal	
1977	Sixth and Main		
1980	Somewhere in Time	Arthur Biehl	
1981	Dream On!		
1983	The Taming of the Shrew	Vincentio	Direct-to-video
1984	Quest		Short film
1984	The Bear	Alabama Alumni	
1986	Stewardess School	Orchestra Conductor	Credited as William Erwin
1987	Planes, Trains and Automobiles	Man on Plane	
1988	She's Having a Baby	Grandfather	
1988	Silent Assassins	Dr. London	
1988	The Land Before Time	Grandfather	Voice
1988	A Place to Hide		
1990	Home Alone	Ed (Man in Airport)	
1990	The Willies	Old Man	
1990	The Color of Evening	Priest	
1991	Night of the Warrior	Coco	
1991	The Entertainers	Sam	
1992	Unbecoming Age	Old Man	
1993	Dennis the Menace	Edward Little	
1994	Naked Gun 33 1/3: The Final Insult	Conductor	
1995	Things to Do in Denver When You're Dead	70-Year-Old Man	
1996	Just Your Luck	Pops	Direct-to-video
1997	Menno's Mind	Mr. Lewis	
1998	Chairman of the Board	Landers	
1998	Art House	Monty	
1999	Forces of Nature	Murray	
1999	Inferno	Eli Hamilton	
2000	Stanley's Gig	Jules	Credited as William Erwin
2000	Down 'n Dirty	Janitor	
2001	Cahoots	Frenchy	
2001	A Crack in the Floor	Harold	Final film role

=== Television ===
Television
Year	Title	Role	Notes
1950	The Silver Theatre		Episode 27: "Coal of Fire"
1950–1951	Fireside Theatre	Doctor	3 episodes Credited as William Erwin - 1 episode
1951	The Bigelow Theatre		Episode 9: "Coal of Fire"
1951	The Stu Erwin Show		Season 1 Episode 20: "High Finance"
1951	Stars Over Hollywood		Episode: "The Ageless"
1951	Hollywood Opening Night		Season 1 Episode 4: "The Ageless"
1952	Lux Video Theatre	Reporter	Season 3 Episode 10: "The Face of Autumn"
1954	Mama		Season 5 Episode 23: "Mama & the Wild Man"
1954	The Philco Television Playhouse	Herman	Credited as William Erwin; Season 6 episode 12: "The Dancers"
1955	Robert Montgomery Presents	Jens Nelson	Season 6 Episode 30: "P.J. Martin and Son"
1955	Studio 57		Season 2 Episode 13: "The Girl in the Bathing Suit"
1955	Highway Patrol	Artie	Season 1 Episode 12: "Phony Insurance"
1955–1956	Screen Directors Playhouse	Carl / Third Conductor / 1st Gambler	3 episodes Credited as William Erwin - 2 episodes Uncredited - 1 episode
1956	Alfred Hitchcock Presents	Fireman (uncredited)	Season 1 Episode 14: "A Bullet for Baldwin"
1956	Schlitz Playhouse of Stars		Season 5 Episode 17: "The Big Payday"
1956	Science Fiction Theatre	Dr. Harold Lewis / Mike	2 episodes
1956	Big Town		2 episodes
1956	The Sheriff of Cochise	Doctor	Season 2 Episode 16: "Tough Guy"
1956	Crusader	Brenner	Season 2 Episode 4: "The Girl Across the Hall"
1956	The Man Called X		Episode 2: "Code 'W'"
1956–1957	Telephone Time	Newspaper Man	Credited as William Erwin; 2 episodes
1956–1959	Cheyenne	Barber / Pvt. Poinsett	2 episodes Uncredited - 1 episode
1957	I Love Lucy	Bum	Uncredited; Season 6 Episode 12: "Lucy and the Loving Cup"
1957	Wire Service		Credited as William Erwin; Episode 22: "Forbidden Ground"
1957	Whirlybirds	Fred Midgley	Credited as William Erwin; Season 1 Episode 36: "Take a Little, Leave a Little"
1957	State Trooper	Neal James	Season 2 Episode 3: "Madman on the Mountain"
1957	Richard Diamond, Private Detective	Sergeant Riker / Detective Ryker / Sgt. Riker	4 episodes Uncredited - 1 episode
1957	Code 3	Doctor	Credited as William Erwin; Episode 32: "Bail Out"
1957–1958	Panic!	Chauffeur / Joseph McGilbert / Interne	3 episodes Credited as William Erwin - 2 episodes
1957–1959	Bachelor Father	Court Clerk / Mr. Logan / Security Guard	3 episodes Credited as Will Erwin - 1 episode
1957–1961	Zane Grey Theatre	Various characters	7 episodes Credited as William Erwin - 4 episodes
1957–1974	Gunsmoke	Various characters	14 episodes Credits as William Erwin or William L. Erwin; Uncredited - 3 episodes
1958	Colt .45	Clerk	Season 1 Episode 15: "Dead Reckoning"
1958	How to Marry a Millionaire	Max Bigelow	Uncredited; Season 1 Episode 19: "Loco Leaves Home"
1958	The Californians	Attorney	Uncredited; Season 1 Episode 31: "Second Trial"
1958	The Walter Winchell File	Bellem	Episode 8: "Thing of Beauty: File #29"
1958	Sea Hunt	Dr. Hugh Benedict	Season 1 Episode 31: "The Big Dive"
1958	Colgate Theatre	Wilber	Episode: "Macreedy's Woman"
1958	Trackdown	Man on Trail / Dawson	2 episodes Uncredited - 1 episode
1958	Man with a Camera	Sam Bartlett	Season 1 Episode 2: "The Warning"
1958	Sugarfoot	Jones	Credited as William Erwin; Season 2 episode 4: "The Ghost"
1958	Flight	Palmer Owens	Credited as William Erwin; Episode 17: "Final Approach"
1958	The Danny Thomas Show	Man in Dream / Emcee	2 episodes Credited as William Erwin - 1 episode
1958	Lawman	Fred Petty	Season 1 Episode 12: "Lady in Question"
1958–1959	M Squad	Detective Gene / Roger Jessop	2 episodes
1958–1960	The Texan	Sheriff Nick Rand / Les Cosby / Stableman	3 episodes Credited as William Erwin - 1 episode
1958–1960	Have Gun - Will Travel	Townsman / Clerk / Citizen	3 episodes Credited as William Erwin - 2 episodes Uncredited - 1 episode
1958–1964	Death Valley Days	Various characters	5 episodes
1959	The Rifleman	Joe Flecker	Season 1 Episode 15: "The Pet"
1959	Wagon Train	Clegg	Season 2 Episode 16: "The Hunter Malloy Story"
1959	Tales of Wells Fargo	Justin Peevy	Season 3 Episode 21: "The Town That Wouldn't Talk"
1959	General Electric Theater		Season 7 Episode 24: "Train for Tecumseh"
1959	Leave It to Beaver	Man	Season 2 Episode 26: "Price of Fame"
1959	The David Niven Show	Cashier	Uncredited; Episode 1: "Fortune's Folly"
1959	Black Saddle	Kelly	Credited as William Erwin; Season 1 Episode 18: "Client: Brand"
1959	Tombstone Territory	Storekeeper	Season 2 Episode 11: "Grave Near Tombstone"
1959	Markham	Arthur Brookman	Season 1 Episode 14: "We Are All Suspect"
1959	Johnny Ringo	Manners	Episode 1: "The Arrival"
1959	Westinghouse Desilu Playhouse		Season 2 Episode 3: "Six Guns for Donegan"
1959	Law of the Plainsman	Dr. Palmer	Episode 9: "The Gibbet"
1959–1963	The Twilight Zone	Various characters	Episode 3: "Mr. Denton on Doomsday" (1959); Episode 5: "Walking Distance" (1959) - Uncredited; Episode 64: "Will the Real Martian Please Stand Up?" (1961); Episode 107: "Mute" (1963) - Uncredited
1959–1963	The Untouchables	Various characters	5 episodes Credited as William Erwin - 3 episodes Uncredited - 2 episodes
1959–1966	Perry Mason	Various characters	5 episodes Credited as William Erwin - 1 episode
1960	The Detectives	Manager	Season 1 Episode 16: "House Call"
1960	Bourbon Street Beat	Doctor	Episode 19: "The 10% Blues"
1960	Rescue 8	Justin	Season 2 Episode 29: "School for Violence"
1960	Stagecoach West	Teller	Episode 1: "High Lonesome"
1960	Coronado 9	Joe	Episode 8: "I Want to Be Hated"
1960–1961	The Andy Griffith Show	An Investor / George Sapley	2 episodes Credited as William Erwin
1960–1961	Michael Shayne	Luke / Landlord	2 episodes
1960–1962	Lassie	Mr. Burton / Bob Thomas	2 episodes Uncredited - 1 episode
1961	Rawhide	Parker	Credited as William Erwin; S3:E17, "Incident of the New Start"
1961	Mister Ed	Mr. Wood	Credited as William Erwin; Season 1 Episode 9: "The Missing Statue"
1961	Outlaws	Townsman	Uncredited; Season 1 Episode 18: "No More Pencils - No More Books"
1961	Peter Loves Mary	Bill Stanhope / 1st Non-Com	2 episodes Credited as William Erwin
1961	Angel	Coach	Credited as Bill Irwin; Episode 28: "The Little Leaguer"
1961	The Defenders	Court Clerk	Season 1 Episode 3: "Death Across the Counter"
1961	Follow the Sun	Frank March	Episode 10: "Little Girl Lost"
1961–1965	My Three Sons	Joe Walters / Steward	4 episodes
1962	87th Precinct	George	Episode 30: "Girl in the Case"
1962	Ben Casey		Season 1 Episode 32: "When You See an Evil Man"
1962	Saints and Sinners	Nolan	Credited as William Erwin; Episode 8: "Daddy's Girl"
1962	Stoney Burke		Episode 10: "The Wanderer"
1962–1964	The Virginian	Bevers / Deputy	2 episodes Uncredited - 1 episode
1963	The Dakotas	Doctor	Episode 18: "Sanctuary at Crystal Springs"
1963	Burke's Law	Fire Marshal	Season 1 Episode 11: "Who Killed Purity Mather?"
1963	The Greatest Show on Earth	Food Truck Cook	Episode 13: "Lady in Limbo"
1963–1967	The Fugitive	Various characters	4 episodes Uncredited - 1 episode
1964	Arrest and Trial	Doctor	Episode 27: "The Revenge of the Worm"
1964	Kraft Suspense Theatre	Father Daley	Season 1 Episode 23: "Their Own Executioners"
1965	Profiles in Courage	Ingalls	Episode 21: Grover Cleveland
1965	The Big Valley	Crown Man on Train	Uncredited; Season 1 Episode 1: "Palms of Glory"
1966	Shane	Clerk	Episode 15: "The Great Invasion: Part 1"
1966–1971	The F.B.I.	Manager / Paxton	3 episodes Uncredited - 1 episode
1967	Laredo	1st Townsman	Uncredited; Season 2 Episode 15: "The Seventh Day"
1967	The Invaders	Manager	Season 1 Episode 5: "Genesis"
1967	The Guns of Will Sonnett	Hotel Clerk	Season 1 Episode 5: "Of Lasting Summers and Jim Sonnett"
1967	The Second Hundred Years	2nd Salesman	Episode 11: "No Experience Necessary"
1967	Get Smart	Mr. Smith	Season 3 Episode 13: "The Mysterious Dr. T"
1969	Mannix	Prop Man	Credited as William Erwin; Season 3 Episode 4: "The Playground"
1969	My World and Welcome to It	American Conductor	Episode 7: "Nobody Ever Kills Dragons Anymore"
1970	Mayberry R.F.D.	Man at Convention	Season 2 Episode 26: "The Mynah Bird"
1970	How Awful About Allan	Dr. Ames	Television movie Credited as William Erwin
1970–1971	Dan August	Coroner	2 episodes
1971–1974	Cannon	Dr. Belden / Dr. Samuel Calvert / Gas Station Proprietor	3 episodes
1973	Hunter	Sam Pickering	Television movie
1973	Barnaby Jones	Atken's Defense Counsel / Customs Officer	2 episodes
1974–1981	The Waltons	Dr. Frederick Grover / Senator Rogers	2 episodes
1975	The Rookies	Cook	Season 3 Episode 22: "Cliffy"
1975	Huckleberry Finn	Harvey Wilkes	Television movie
1977	The Krofft Supershow	Old Dad	Episode 2: "Black Box, Parts 1 & 2"
1977	Forever Fernwood	Elmo	Episode: #1.25
1977	Lou Grant	Old Man	Credited as William L. Erwin; Season 1 Episode 8: "Scoop"
1977	Tarantulas: The Deadly Cargo	Mr. Schneider	Television movie
1979	Struck by Lightning	Glenn Diamond	4 episodes
1981	Eight Is Enough	Cal Fitzpatrick	Season 5 Episode 9: "Bradfordgate"
1981	The Brady Girls Get Married	The Reverend	Miniseries though originally intended as a Television movie
1981	The Dukes of Hazzard	Clarence Stovall	Season 4 Episode 6: "The Great Bank Robbery"
1981	The Rainbow Patch	Patch	Series lead
1982	Dallas	Abel Greeley	Season 5 Episode 21: "The Prodigal"
1982	Moonlight	Dr. Tucker	Television movie
1982	Drop-Out Father	Grandpa	Television movie
1982	The Jeffersons	T.J. Wheeler	Season 9 Episode 8: "Death Smiles on a Dry Cleaner: Part 1"
1983	The Optimist	Grizzly Veteran	Season 1 Episode 2: "The Good, the Bad and the Nasty"
1983	Ghost Dancing	Joe Greyfeather	Television movie
1983	Voyagers!	Eisenhowers' Neighbor	Episode 19: "Barriers of Sound"
1983	Hart to Hart	Sir Gavin MacLaish	Season 5 Episode 9: "Highland Fling"
1983	Lone Star	Ezra Holloway	Television movie
1984	Hard Knox	General Garfield	Television movie
1984	Falcon Crest	Night Editor	Season 3 Episode 17: "Power Play"
1984	Invitation to Hell	Walt Henderson	Television movie
1984	E/R	Mr. Williams	Episode 10: "Only a Nurse"
1984	ABC Weekend Specials	Specter Inspector	Season 8 Episode 1: "Henry Hamilton Graduate Ghost"
1984–1987	Who's the Boss?	Leon / Santa Claus / Ted	3 episodes
1985	Detective in the House		Episode: "Whatever Happened To...?"
1985	Generation	John	Television movie
1985	Too Close for Comfort	Captain Milarzen	Credited as Bill Irwin; Season 5 episode 15: "No Deposit, No Return"
1985	Silver Spoons	Senator Platt	Season 4 Episode 11: "The Barbarians"
1985	Santa Barbara	Harold Beard	Episode: #1.361
1986–1987	Highway to Heaven	Clarence Kelly / Santa	3 episodes
1986–1991	Growing Pains	Various characters	8 episodes
1987	On Fire	Joe's father	Television movie
1987	Roxie	Kiner	Episode 2: "Dog Days"
1987	Punky Brewster	Ben	Season 3 Episode 6: "Hands Across the Halls"
1988	High Mountain Rangers		Episode 1: "The Only Place to Live"
1988	Married... with Children	Hiram Massey	Season 2 Episode 16: "Master the Possibilities"
1988–1990	Just the Ten of Us	Mr. Pruitt / Barker / Ralphie	4 episodes
1989	Moonlighting	Duncan Kennedy	Season 5 Episode 9: "Perfetc"
1990	Star Trek: The Next Generation	Doctor Dalen Quaice	Season 4 Episode 5: "Remember Me"
1991	Quantum Leap	Mr. Deever	Season 4 Episode 3: "Hurricane - August 17, 1969"
1991	Full House	Mr. Ferguson	Season 5 Episode 7: "The Volunteer"
1991	Knots Landing	Mr. Wineke	Season 13 Episode 8: "House of Cards"
1992	The Golden Girls	Mr. Hubbard	Season 7 Episode 16: "Questions and Answers"
1992	Harry and the Hendersons	Guest #1	Season 3 Episode 6: "The Outing"
1993	Seinfeld	Sidney Fields	2 episodes Uncredited - 1 episode
1993	Fallen Angels	Chick	Season 1 Episode 4
1993	The John Larroquette Show	Man #1	Season 1 Episode 7: "Jumping Off the Wagon"
1993	Against the Grain	Harold	Episode 8: "A House is Not a Home"
1994	Burke's Law	Noah Stark	Season 1 Episode 6: "Who Killed Alexander the Great?"
1994	Search and Rescue	Bill	Television movie
1994	Lois & Clark: The New Adventures of Superman	Andy Tucker	Season 2 Episode 6: "Operation Blackout"
1995	The Mommies	Chester	Season 2 Episode 7: "I Do, I Do Again"
1995	Pig Sty	Jenkins	2 episodes
1995	Living Single	Mr. Foster	Season 2 Episode 27: "The Shake Up"
1995	High Sierra Search and Rescue	Will	Episode 1: "If You Have to Ask the Price"
1995	Live Shot	Vernon	Episode 7: "Where Towering Infernos" or simply "Towering Infernos"
1995	The Jeff Foxworthy Show	Santa	Season 1 Episode 10: "Foxworthy Family Feud"
1997	Suddenly Susan	Mr. Tidgely	Season 1 Episode 14: "What a Card"
1997	Grace Under Fire	Old Man	Season 4 Episode 21: "Quentin Gets His Gun"
1997	The Drew Carey Show	Mr. Bradbury	Season 2 Episode 22: "Drew vs. Mimi: Part 2"
1997	The Naked Truth	Victor	Season 3 Episode 10: "The Unsinkable Nora Wilde"
2000	The Michael Richards Show	Mr. Flaherty	Episode 5: "The Nursing Home"
2001	Boycott	Loading Dock Man #2	Television movie
2001	Just Shoot Me!	Mr. King	Credited as Bill Ewrin; Season 5 episode 17: "Where's Poppa?"
2001	The West Wing	Ronald Cruikshank	Season 3 Episode 9: "The Women of Qumar"
2002	So Little Time	George	Episode 21: "The Volunteer"
2002	Comedy Central Thanxgiveaway: Turkey vs. Pilgrims	Grandpa	Television movie
2003	Monk	Hiram Hollings	Season 2 Episode 5: "Mr. Monk and the Very, Very Old Man"
2004	The King of Queens	Whitey	Season 6 Episode 21: "Tank Heaven"
2004	Everwood	Ollie	Season 2 Episode 19: "Sick"
2006	My Name Is Earl	Old Man playing Ping Pong	Season 2 Episode 5: "Van Hickey" (Final television role)
