= Stephen Saux =

American actor, writer, cinematographer, short film producer

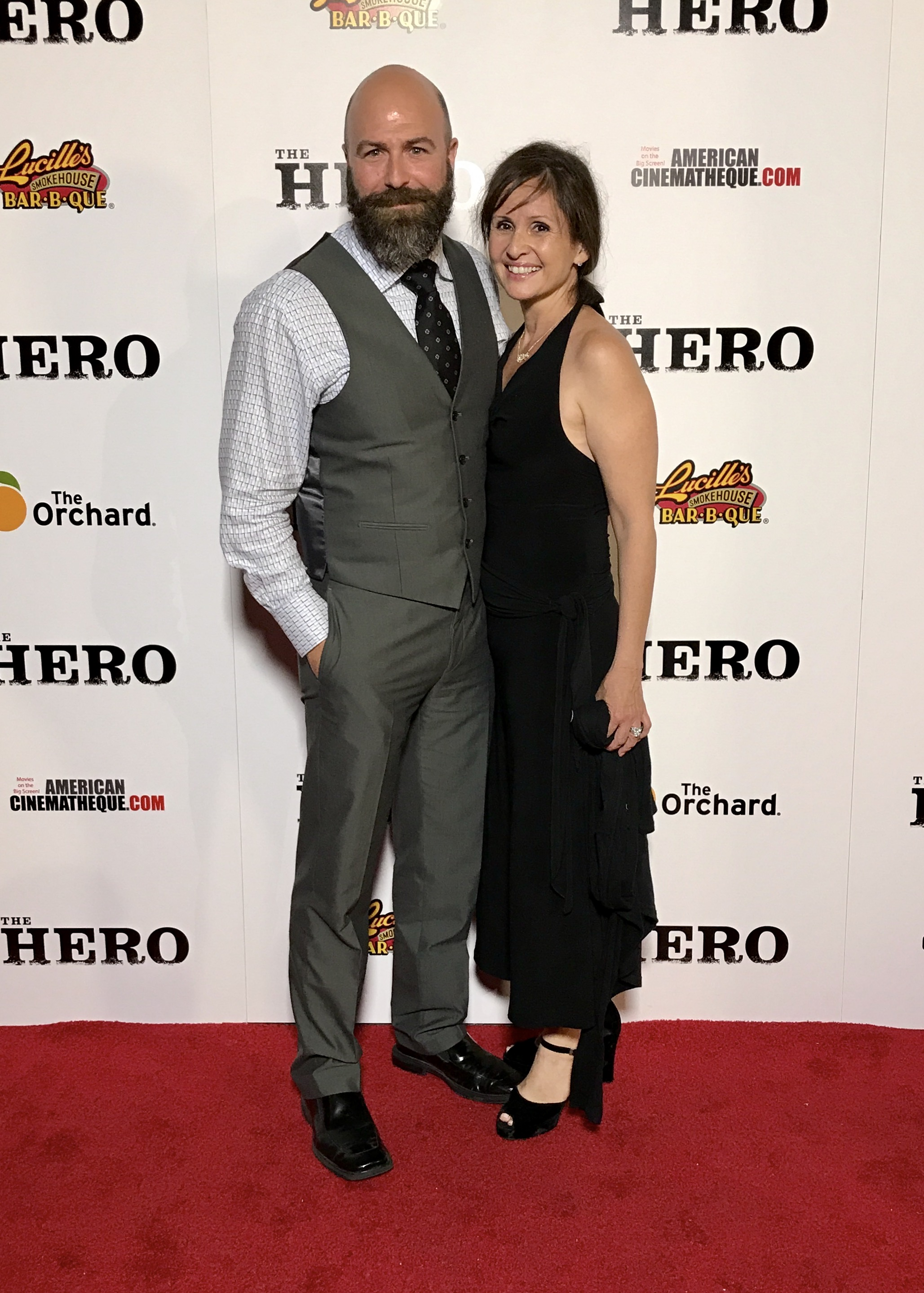
- Stephen with his wife Lori at the premier of The Hero in 2017
- Occupations: Actor; Writer; Cinematographer; Producer; Podcast Host
- Years active: 1997–present
- Spouse: Lori Saux
- Children: 2
- Website: www.stephensaux.com

Stephen Thomas Saux, Jr.(/sɒks/) is an American actor, cinematographer, voiceover artist and podcast host. He and his wife Lori are best known for hosting, the podcast ‘If We Knew Then’ and creating the web series The Life of Lori Murphy, Ninja Mom and the award-winning short films, The Want, The MARS Experiment and Just For One Day. He is a graduate of The Second City and was a founding member of the “Jumping the Shark” improv troupe. His most notable television credits include recurring roles on NBC's The Office, The Ranch on Netflix and the FOX comedy Dads. Early film credits include Deliver Us from Eva and the Farrelly brothers comedy Stuck on You. He is the face of the Southern Nevada Water Authority conservation commercial campaign and also appeared on the cover of the video game Call of Duty 2: Big Red One. Stephen starred in the theater production of The Portrait of a Life, a play written by his wife and performed at the famed NoHo Arts Center in North Hollywood, CA.

== Filmography ==
- Imperfect Women .... Bailiff
- Call Me Kat .... Greg
- B Positive .... Anesthesiologist
- The Ranch - 3 episodes .... Mike
- Ninja Mom (Web Series)
- The Life of Lori Murphy (Web Series) - 5 episodes .... Stephen
- Dads - 2 episodes .... Waiter/Painted Chest Guy
- NCIS - Episode: About Face ... Patrick Turner
- The Office - 9 episodes .... Justin Spitzer
- A Man's World .... William Barrington
- Call of Duty 2: Big Red One .... Pvt. Roland Roger
- Call of Duty 2 .... Pvt. Roland Roger
- The Big House - Episode: A Friend in Need .... Buddy
- The Attendant .... Duece
- Return to Babylon .... Mr. Producer
- Stuck on You .... Drive-by Heckler
- An American Reunion .... Dr. M
- Deliver Us from Eva .... Bartender
- Lost in the USA .... Customs Officer
- Citizens of Perpetual Indulgence .... Film Festival Judge
- A Crack in the Floor .... Kevin Gordon
- Ballad of the Nightingale .... Mitch
- Fallout .... Marine
- Caroline in the City - Episode: Caroline and the Toothbrush .... The Trainer
- The Triggerman .... Nero

== Podcast ==
Stephen and Lori produce and co-host the podcast ‘If We Knew Then." Inspired by their son Liam, the podcast aims to share honest and useful conversations about supports, therapies, education, and society as it pertains to Down syndrome advocacy and parenting.
