= Futuresport =

- Official DVD cover
- Genre: Action; Sci-Fi; Sport; Thriller
- Written by: Robert Hewitt Wolfe; Steve De Jarnatt
- Directed by: Ernest Dickerson
- Starring: Dean Cain; Vanessa Williams; Wesley Snipes
- Music by: Stewart Copeland
- Country of origin: United States
- Original language: English

Production
- Executive producers: Deborah Raffin; Michael Viner; Ron Ziskin
- Producers: Wesley Snipes; David Roessell
- Production location: Vancouver
- Cinematography: Jonathan Freeman
- Editor: Stephen Lovejoy
- Running time: 87 minutes
- Production companies: Amen Ra Films; New Star Television
- Budget: $9 million

Original release
- Network: ABC
- Release: October 1, 1998

Futuresport is a 1998 American made-for-television sports film directed by Ernest Dickerson, starring Dean Cain, Vanessa Williams, and Wesley Snipes. It originally aired on ABC in October 1998, was released on VHS and DVD in March 1999 and then distributed outside of the U.S. by Minerva Pictures.

== Plot ==
The film is set in 2025, and centers on a sport called "Futuresport" (a combination of basketball, baseball and hockey that uses hoverboards and rollerblades) created as a non-lethal way to reduce gang warfare. Tre Ramzey (Dean Cain) along with his ex-girlfriend Alex Torres (Vanessa Williams) and his old coach Obike Fixx (Wesley Snipes) must prevent an all out war between the North American Alliance and the Pan-Pacific Commonwealth (The Com). At stake is who rules over the Hawaiian Islands—which are being terrorized by Eric Sythe (JR Bourne) and his gang the Hawaiian Liberation Organization (Hilo). It takes a revolutionary sport to stop a revolution.

== Cast ==
- Dean Cain as Treymayne "Tre The Pharaoh" Ramzey
- Vanessa Williams as Alejandra "Alex" Torres
- Wesley Snipes as Obike Fixx
- Mikela Jay as Lorelei
- Bill Smitrovich as Coach Douglas
- Tara Frederick as "Anarchy"
- Valerie Chow as "Jet"
- Brian Jensen as Tom "Mayhem" Mayhew
- Adrian G. Griffiths as Blake Becker
- David Kaye as Ronnie Vance
- Emanuelle Chriqui as Gina Gonzales
- Brad Loree as Roger Willard
- Lloyd Adams as Travis Middlebrooks
- JR Bourne as Eric Sythe
- Francoise Yip as Keahi
- Ken Kirzinger as Jack "Hatchet Jack" Jamiston
- Hiro Kanagawa as Otomo Akira
- Lori Stewart as Carly "Kiwi" Madigan
- Patrick Pfrimmer as Sebastian Krajenski
- Matthew Walker as Neville Hodgkins
- Gerard Plunkett as Edgar Computer Voice
