= A Crack in the Floor =

2001 film by Sean Stanek and Corbin Timbrook

- Directed by: Sean Stanek; Corbin Timbrook
- Written by: Sean Stanek
- Starring: Mario Lopez; Gary Busey; Bo Hopkins; Rance Howard; Tracy Scoggins
- Distributed by: Norris Johnson Productions; Odyssey Video
- Release date: April 24, 2001
- Running time: 90 minutes
- Country: United States
- Language: English

A Crack in the Floor (2001) is a horror film directed by Sean Stanek and Corbin Timbrook.

== Plot ==
For the past 33 years Jeremiah Hill (Roger Hewlett) has lived alone, with no contact with the outside world, and he intends to keep it that way. Jeremiah's mother (Tracy Scoggins) had always warned him not to associate with the outside world, and her brutal rape and killing right before his eyes taught him a lesson he intends never to forget; and those who enter his world will pay a deadly price. As Lehman (Mario Lopez) and his five friends from Los Angeles start their weekend camping trip they run into Tyler Trout (Gary Busey) and Floyd Fryed (Rance Howard) who represent the gateway into this distorted world that they are about to enter. These things just don't happen in the small mountain town of Sheriff Talmidge (Bo Hopkins) and Deputy Kevin Gordon (Stephen Saux). By stumbling upon this lonely cabin in the woods, the men have shattered 33 years of solitude in Jeremiah's world. Soon their weekend trip of hiking and camping will become a nightmare of survival.

== Cast ==
- Mario Lopez as Lehman
- Gary Busey as Tyler Trout
- Bo Hopkins as Sheriff Talmidge
- Rance Howard as Floyd Fryed
- Tracy Scoggins as Jeremiah's Mother
- Justine Priestley as Kate
- Daisy McCrackin as Heidi
- Bentley Mitchum as Johnny
- Jason Oliver as Billy
- Francesca Orsi as Sunny
- Stephen Saux as Kevin Gordon
- Roger Hewlett as Jeremiah
  - Kyle Patrick Feuer as Young Jeremiah
- Frank Collison as Turner
- Bill Erwin as Harold
- Jacquie Barnbrook as Maggie
- Robert Ambrose as Russell
- Con Schell as Brad Mitchell
- Madeleine Wade as Jesse (credited as Madeleine Lindley)
- David Naughton as The Empty Man
