= Love and Suicide (2005 film) =

2005 film by Lisa France

- Love and Suicide
- Directed by: Lisa France
- Written by: Luis Moro; Lisa France
- Produced by: Luis Moro, Jerry Katell, Damian Lichtenstein
- Starring: Kamar de los Reyes; Luis Moro; Daisy McCrackin
- Cinematography: Damian Lictenstein
- Edited by: Bruno Briel
- Music by: Matt Mariano
- Distributed by: Urban Family Entertainment
- Release date: 2005 (Miami)
- Running time: 85 minutes
- Country: United States
- Languages: English; Spanish

Love and Suicide is a 2005 feature film romance by Luis Moro and Lisa France, starring Moro, Kamar de los Reyes and Daisy McCrackin. Moro wrote and filmed it over the course of 12 days in 2003, while attending the Havana International Film Festival for his previous film, Anne B. Real. This was the first film to be shot by an American in Cuba since 1959, when actor Errol Flynn made his last picture, Cuban Rebel Girls.

== Plot summary ==
Tomas (Kamar De Los Reyes) lives in a vicious circle of life and death. To bury his grief over a lost love, he enters a world between dreams and reality; the path between love and suicide. Alberto (Luis Moro) peacefully swims with life, knowing life will never outlast eternal time; dreams and reality are the same. Tomas find himself in a world of history preserved in the present, where time has stopped, and souls rise beyond material surfaces. This world exists in Cuba. Nina (Daisy McCrackin) a modern-day gypsy looking for her purpose in life, while Tomas keeps running from his. In a frantic moment, Tomas recalls the simplicity brought forth with Nina and the ultimate test of authenticity given by Alberto. In this moment, Tomas discovers the one thing between love and suicide.

== Behind the scenes ==
Love & Suicide began as a screenplay that was inspired by Moro's desire to make a film in his native country of Cuba. The cast and crew paid their own way to Havana to shoot the film. Originally Moro and France's earlier film, Anne B. Real, was accepted into the Havana Film Festival. The intention was to shoot their film, while they were at the festival. Described by France as a “no budget” project, the film was shot by Lichtenstein, who carried a shoebox-sized DVX HD digital camera, two wireless microphones and flashlights with a small saucer reflector for lighting. The 40 hours of unedited scenes shot in the streets, parks, and buildings of Old Havana were produced after cast and crew kept their commitments to the daily events of the film festival.
