= Daisy McCrackin =

American actress (born 1979)

- Born: November 12, 1979 (age 46); Marin County, California, U.S.
- Occupation: Actress
- Years active: 2000–present
- Spouse: Michel Streurman (2018–present)
- Children: 1
- Musical career
- Genres: Folk
- Labels: Aeronaut; Deaf Smith

Daisy McCrackin (born November 12, 1979) is an American actress.

== Early life ==
McCrackin was born in Marin County, California, and raised in San Francisco.

== Career ==
She made her film debut in the 2001 straight-to-video film A Crack in the Floor co-starring Mario Lopez. She has appeared in television series, such as Cold Case, Angel, and The Division, and films such as Hollywood Horror, 3000 Miles to Graceland, Halloween: Resurrection (2002), and Love and Suicide (2005). She wrote the soundtrack and starred in the 2009 short film Till Death Do Us Part. Mica Film released this debut recording, Till Death Do Us Part, engineered by Steve Muhic in August 2009. Aeronaut Records followed with her EP release of The Rodeo Grounds in November 2009. She appeared in the 2011 film adaptation of Atlas Shrugged.

She released a full-length record in 2011 titled God Willing and had produced six music videos that are available on YouTube.

In 2018, Daisy starred in House of Demons and Delirium.

== Personal life ==
In the early-2010s, McCrackin resided in an artists colony in Topanga Canyon.

=== Kidnapping ===
On May 3, 2017 McCrackin and fellow actor Joseph Capone were victims of a kidnapping in Los Angeles. Three assailants, Amber Neal, Keith Andre Stewart and Johntae Jones, entered McCrackin’s home, "pistol whipped" Capone, and then covered his and McCrackin's heads with black hoods. From there, the kidnappers drove Capone to a house in Compton, stripped him nude, bound him, and placed him in a bathtub without food for around 30 hours.

Meanwhile, two of the other assailants drove McCrackin to several banks in her own car, and told her to provide at least $10,000 (£7,500) for the release of Capone. McCrackin was able to escape and alert police after being driven back to her home. The defendants were expected to appear in court on July 23, 2018 for a pre-trial hearing. All three face life in prison if convicted.

== Filmography ==
Year	Title	Role	Notes	Ref.
2000	Angel	Bethany Chaulk	Episode: "Untouched"	
2001	3000 Miles to Graceland	Megan		
2001	The Huntress	Sierra	Episode: "Family Therapy"	
2001	A Crack in the Floor	Heidi		
2002	Special Unit 2	Djinn / Genie / Natalie	Episode: "The Wish"	
2002	Halloween: Resurrection	Donna Chang		
2003	Peak Experience	Heather		
2003	Cold Case	Tina Bayes	Episode: "Churchgoing People"	
2004	The Division		Episode: "As I Was Going to St. Ives..."	
2005	Love and Suicide	Nina		
2005	The Unseen	Veronica		
2005	Hollywood Horror			
2009	Till Death Do Us Part	Cristal	Short film	
2010	Venus & Vegas	Jill		
2011	Atlas Shrugged	Clerk		
2013	Joan's Day Out	Daisy	Short film	
2014	Love at First Sight	Diane	Short film	
2015	Jane the Virgin	Mommy	Episode: "Chapter Seventeen"	
2016	She Rises	Rosebud	Jury Award for Best Actress	
2018	House of Demons	Anne		
2018	Delirium	Mrs. Walker		

== Discography ==
- The Rodeo Grounds (2009)
- God Willing (2011)

== See also ==
- List of kidnappings
