= John Cappelletti =

American football player (born 1952)

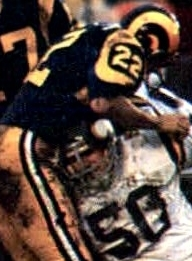
- Cappelletti (22) with the Los Angeles Rams in 1977

No. 22, 25
- Position: Running back

Personal information
- Born: August 9, 1952 (age 74); Upper Darby, Pennsylvania, U.S.
- Listed height: 6 ft 1 in (1.85 m)
- Listed weight: 215 lb (98 kg)

Career information
- High school: Monsignor Bonner (Drexel Hill, Pennsylvania)
- College: Penn State (1971–1973)
- NFL draft: 1974: 1st round, 11th overall pick

Career history
- Los Angeles Rams (1974–1978); San Diego Chargers (1980–1983)

Awards and highlights
- Heisman Trophy (1973); Unanimous All-American (1973); Penn State Nittany Lions No. 22 retired

Career NFL statistics
- Rushing attempts: 824
- Rushing yards: 2,951
- Rushing touchdowns: 24
- Receptions: 135
- Receiving yards: 1,233
- Receiving touchdowns: 4
- Stats at Pro Football Reference
- College Football Hall of Fame

John Raymond Cappelletti (born August 9, 1952) is an American former professional football player who was a running back in the National Football League (NFL) with the Los Angeles Rams and San Diego Chargers.

He played college football for the Penn State Nittany Lions, winning the Heisman Trophy in 1973. He was inducted into the College Football Hall of Fame in 1993. Coach Joe Paterno said that Cappelletti was "the best football player I ever coached" or words to that effect. Cappelletti's relationship with his younger brother Joey, who was stricken with leukemia, was chronicled into a book and television movie, Something for Joey.

== Early life ==
Cappelletti was born on August 9, 1952, in Upper Darby, Pennsylvania, where he was raised. He was one of five children born to John and Anna Cappelletti. Cappelletti attended St. Laurence School in Upper Darby (a kindergarten to 8th grade Catholic school) prior to entering Monsignor Bonner High School in Drexel Hill, a suburb west of Philadelphia in Delaware County, where he played football and basketball. He played quarterback for the Friars and graduated in 1970.

In 1969, he was selected first team All-Catholic and All-Delaware County. In 1974, Bonner presented Cappelletti with the Coach Jack Gottschalk Memorial Award. On the same day, Bonner's alumni association established the John Cappelletti Award, to be given annually to the senior who best exemplifies qualities of character, dedication and athletic success. During the same ceremony presenting these awards, Cappelletti was inducted as the first charter member of Bonner's Hall of Fame, and his jersey number 11 was retired by the school.

== College career ==
Cappelletti attended Pennsylvania State University (Penn State). During his sophomore season in 1971, he played as a defensive back, as the Nittany Lions had two senior running backs who were taken early in the 1972 NFL draft: Franco Harris (13th overall) and Lydell Mitchell (48th). Head coach Joe Paterno considered Cappelletti too good an athlete not to play somewhere on the team, and intended to switch Cappelletti back to offense as a junior after Harris and Mitchell graduated.

As a senior tailback at Penn State in 1973, Cappelletti gained 1,522 yards on 286 carries scoring 17 touchdowns as the Nittany Lions rolled to an undefeated 12–0 season. In his two-year running-back career, Cappelletti gained over 100 yards in thirteen games and had a career total of 2,639 yards and twenty-nine touchdowns for an average of 120 yards per game and 5.1 yards per carry. In the final month of the 1973 season, he rushed for more than 200 yards in three consecutive games. His 2,639 yards in only two years is 14th all-time at Penn State (as of 2024).

He was awarded the 1973 Heisman Trophy, Maxwell Award, the UPI College Football Player of the Year, the Walter Camp Award, the Touchdown Club of Columbus Chic Harley Award, ABC-TV Player of the Year, as well as receiving first team consensus All-America honors. He was also named Amateur Athlete of the Year by the Philadelphia Sports Writers Association. He was the first Penn State player to be awarded the Heisman Trophy. His Heisman acceptance speech, where he dedicated his award to his dying brother Joey, is one of the most memorable in the history of college sports. When Archbishop Fulton J. Sheen was to follow Cappelletti's speech with a closing benediction, he said "'There is no need for a benediction. God has already blessed you with John Cappelletti.'"

He was also a member of the Gamma Phi chapter of Phi Gamma Delta at Penn State.

The relationship between Cappelletti and his younger brother, who died of childhood leukemia on April 8, 1976, was made into a television movie in 1977 called Something for Joey; Cappelletti was played by Marc Singer. The movie was based on the book of the same name written by Richard E. Peck and chronicled the bond between the two brothers as Cappelletti supported his young brother, ill with cancer.

During Cappelletti's senior season, Penn State played the West Virginia Mountaineers in late October. The morning of the game, Cappelletti asked Joey what he wanted for his upcoming 11th birthday. Joey replied: "I want you to score three touchdowns for me. No, four." In Something for Joey, a shocked Cappelletti is seen confiding to a teammate: "How am I going to score four touchdowns?" At the end of the first half, Cappelletti had scored three touchdowns, well on his way to four. But Paterno did not like to run up the score against opponents, so when the game resumed after halftime, Paterno told Cappelletti he would be on the bench. Cappelletti quietly took his seat on the bench, without telling Paterno of Joey's wish. Late in the third quarter, one of Cappelletti's teammates told Paterno of Joey's wish. On Penn State's next possession, Paterno shouted "22" and Cappelletti took the field; he scored his fourth touchdown on the same possession, and pointed to Joey as he ran off the field. The Lions scored three more touchdowns in the fourth quarter and won 62–14.

== Legacy and honors ==
Cappelletti was inducted into the College Football Hall of Fame in 1993, and is also a member of the National Italian American Sports Hall of Fame (1989). He was inducted into the Philadelphia Sports Hall of Fame as a member of the 2009 inductee class. In 2006, Cappelletti was inducted into the Regions Bank Orange Bowl Hall of Honor.

The undefeated 1973 Penn State team was honored at Beaver Stadium during halftime of the 2013 home opener on September 7, and Cappelletti received special recognition – his No. 22 was retired by the program, the first and only number to be retired by any sport at the university.

He has received the following honors, among others;

- Heisman Trophy (1973)
- Maxwell Award (1973)
- Walter Camp Award (1973)
- UPI Player of the Year (1973)
- Chic Harley Award (1973)
- Unanimous All-American (1973)
- First-team All-East (1973)
- Penn State Nittany Lions No. 22 retired

== Professional career ==
Cappelletti was selected in the first round as the 11th overall pick of the 1974 NFL draft, taken by the Los Angeles Rams. He played nine seasons in the league, five with the Rams (1974–1978), and four with the San Diego Chargers (1980−1983). From 1976 to 1978, he started every game at fullback for the Rams. In 1976 and 1978, he had nearly 1,000 total yards rushing and receiving each year; leading the Rams in rushing in 1978. He missed the entire 1979 season due to a groin injury, and was traded to the Chargers before the 1980 season for a draft pick. Cappelletti said the Rams could have gotten more in the trade, but accommodated his wish to play in San Diego. Over three years with the Chargers, he played more sparingly each year, with less than 100 rushing attempts during that entire time. The groin injury ultimately led to his retirement.

== NFL career statistics ==
Legend
**Bold**	Career high

=== Regular season ===
Year	Team	Games		Rushing					Receiving				
Year	Team	GP	GS	Att	Yds	Avg	Lng	TD	Rec	Yds	Avg	Lng	TD
1974	LA	14	1	55	198	3.6	20	0	6	35	5.8	9	0
1975	LA	13	0	48	158	3.3	30	**6**	0	0	0.0	0	0
1976	LA	14	**14**	177	**688**	3.9	38	1	30	302	10.1	32	**1**
1977	LA	14	**14**	**178**	598	3.4	15	5	28	228	8.1	25	**1**
1978	LA	14	**14**	174	604	3.5	26	3	**41**	**382**	9.3	**37**	**1**
1980	SD	10	8	101	364	3.6	**46**	5	13	112	8.6	12	0
1981	SD	**16**	6	68	254	3.7	30	4	10	126	**12.6**	25	**1**
1982	SD	9	6	22	82	3.7	17	0	7	48	6.9	22	0
1983	SD	1	0	1	5	**5.0**	5	0	0	0	0.0	0	0
		105	63	824	2,951	3.6	46	24	135	1,233	9.1	37	4

=== Playoffs ===
Year	Team	Games		Rushing					Receiving				
Year	Team	GP	GS	Att	Yds	Avg	Lng	TD	Rec	Yds	Avg	Lng	TD
1974	LA	**2**	0	4	13	3.3	5	0	1	5	5.0	5	0
1975	LA	**2**	0	1	1	1.0	1	**1**	0	0	0.0	0	0
1976	LA	**2**	**2**	**35**	**113**	3.2	**16**	0	**3**	**28**	9.3	13	0
1977	LA	1	1	7	11	1.6	6	0	1	4	4.0	4	0
1978	LA	**2**	**2**	13	63	4.8	14	0	2	21	**10.5**	**15**	0
1980	SD	1	0	0	0	0.0	0	0	0	0	0.0	0	0
1981	SD	**2**	1	1	5	**5.0**	5	0	0	0	0.0	0	0
1982	SD	**2**	1	2	5	2.5	5	0	1	-2	-2.0	0	0
		14	7	63	211	3.3	16	1	8	56	7.0	15	0

== Personal life ==
Cappelletti is married with four sons and resides in Laguna Niguel, California with his wife Betty (née Berry). His sister-in-law is the daughter of Heisman Trophy winner Alan Ameche. The first time Cappelletti ever saw a Heisman Trophy was as a college sophomore visiting Ameche's home with his teenage brother, where Ameche's trophy was on the mantel. He is not related to former Boston Patriots star and 1964 AFL MVP Gino Cappelletti.

Cappelletti also enjoys classic cars.

== See also ==
- List of Pennsylvania State University people
- List of people from Pennsylvania
- List of Phi Gamma Delta members
