= Lisa France (writer) =

American film director and screenwriter

Lisa France (born May 15, 1967) is a director and screenwriter known for directing Anne B. Real (2003). Nominations for Anne B. Real include two from the Film Independent Spirit Awards: a nomination for the prestigious John Cassavetes Award, and a Best Debut Performance nomination for Janice Richardson. France also directed Love and Suicide (2005), and Roll with Me (2017). In 2021, France directed three episodes of the Oprah Winfrey Network drama Queen Sugar, created and executive produced by Ava DuVernay.

== Early life ==
Lisa France was born on May 15, 1967, in Quincy, Massachusetts. She went to Brooklyn College, where she played NCAA Division I basketball. At Brooklyn College, she filed a successful Title IX lawsuit against the school's athletic department over a lack of funding for women's sports. She went on to play professional basketball in the United Kingdom. She was first drawn to filmmaking at the age of 29 when she saw Meet Joe Black filming near her apartment in New York City. France did stunt work in films like Spike Lee's He Got Game and Summer of Sam, as well as the TV show The Sopranos, while preparing to start her directing career.

== Career ==
In 1999, France directed her first short film, Love in Tow, starring Zach Braff and Quentin Crisp.

Her first feature film, Anne B. Real, was released in 2003. The film, about a young woman rapper in Spanish Harlem named Cynthia who is inspired by The Diary of a Young Girl by Anne Frank, won a Black Reel Award for Outstanding Independent Film, and was nominated for the prestigious Independent Spirit John Cassavetes Award (as well as a Best Debut Performance for Janice Richardson as Cynthia). Writing for the World Jewish Digest in 2004 upon the release of the Anne B. Real DVD, film critic Jan Lisa Huttner wrote:

Like her heroine, Ms. France finds an artistic imperative in Anne’s words. “If we’re ever going to have peace in this world, we have to continue to make stories that join cultures,” she said. I think Anne Frank, who pasted Hollywood photos around her bed and dreamed that her words would make her immortal, would agree.

Twenty-two years later, Huttner hosted screenings of Anne B. Real in Manhattan and Chicago as part of her annual SWAN Day series. Anne Frank was chosen as the subject of the SWAN Day 2026 program because of the controversy triggered by Minnesota governor Tim Walz’s invocation of her diary at a news conference he held during the January 2026 ICE raids in Minneapolis. Although France was unable to attend the event due to her shooting schedule, Janice Richardson was on site to introduce the film as well as participate in a meet-and-greet reception afterwards.

In 2005, France directed Love and Suicide, the first American film shot in Cuba since 1959, as well as The Unseen. She directed her first documentary in 2017, Roll with Me, about Suheil Aghabi's 3,100 mile journey across the United States in his wheelchair. Roll with Me won awards at the Virginia Film Festival, the Woodstock Film Festival, and the Milan International Film Festival, and was a special selection at the Slamdance Film Festival. Distributed by Ava DuVernay's distribution collective Array, the documentary was released in 2018.

== Filmography ==
=== Film ===
==== Director ====
- Anne B. Real (2003)
- Love and Suicide (2005)
- The Unseen (2005)
- Roll with Me (2017)
- Her Boyfriend's Secret (2018)
- My Killer Client (2018)
- Fatal Friend Request (2019)
- Her Secret Family Killer (2019)
- Everyday But Christmas (2019)
- Who Wants Me Dead? (2020)
- A Christmas Mission (2020)
- Greyson Family Christmas (2021)
- Merry Kiss Cam (2022)
- The Great Holiday Bake War (2022)

==== Writing ====
- Anne B. Real (2003)
- Love and Suicide (2005)
- The Unseen (2005)

=== Television ===
- Queen Sugar (2021, 3 episodes)
- The Cleaning Lady (2022, 1 episode)
- Naomi (2022, 1 episode)
