= Brad Loree =

Canadian actor and stuntman (born 1960)

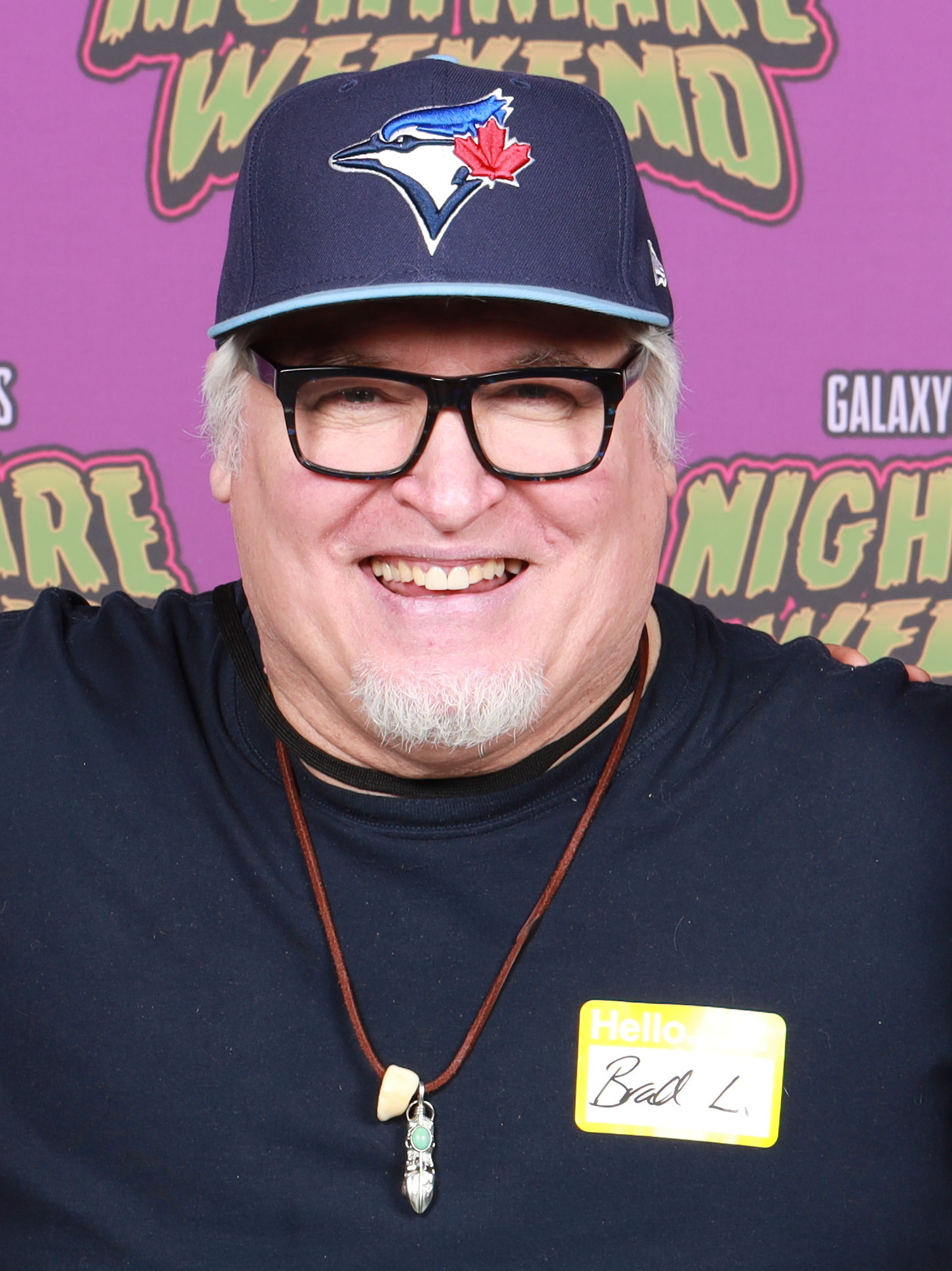
- Loree in 2025
- Born: Bradley Clifford Roy Lee; July 5, 1960 (age 65); Burnaby, British Columbia, Canada
- Occupations: Actor; stuntman
- Years active: 1993-present

Bradley Clifford Roy Loree (born July 5, 1960) is a Canadian actor and stuntman. He is a member of Stunts Canada. He played Michael Myers in Halloween: Resurrection (2002).

Loree was born in Burnaby. He is 6 ft 2 in (1.88 m) tall.

== Filmography ==
selected

- The Cabin in the Woods stunt performer (2012)
- Mr. Hush - Actor - Holland Price (2011)
- Messages Deleted - stunt coordinator (2010)
- Tron: Legacy - stunt performer (2010)
- Tooth Fairy - stunt performer (2010)
- The Twilight Saga: New Moon - stunt performer (2009)
- 2012 - stunt performer (2009)
- Watchmen - stunt performer (2009)
- Battlestar Galactica: Razor - stunt performer (2007)
- Martian Child - stunt double for John Cusack (2007)
- Fantastic Four: Rise of the Silver Surfer - stunt performer (2007)
- X-Men: The Last Stand - stunt performer (2006)
- Smallville: Lexmas - actor (2005)
- Catwoman - stunt performer (2004)
- Scooby Doo 2: Monsters Unleashed - stunt performer (2004)
- White Chicks - Stunt performer, played Dealer Henchman (2004)
- Stargate SG-1 - actor (2004)
- X2: X-Men United - William Stryker (flashback scenes), stunt performer (2003)
- Halloween: Resurrection - actor, co-stunt coordinator, Michael Myers (2002)
- Smallville - stunt performer (2001, 2002)
- Los Luchadores - stunt double (2001)
- Cats & Dogs - stunt performer (2001)
- Get Carter - stunt performer (2000)
- Mission to Mars - stunt performer (2000)
- Shanghai Noon - stunt performer (2000)
- Reindeer Games - stunt performer (2000)
- The 13th Warrior - stunt performer (1999)
- Futuresport - actor (1998)
- Timecop - actor (1994)
- Highlander: The Watchers - actor (1993)
