= Robert D. Reilly Jr. =

US Navy rear admiral (born 1953)

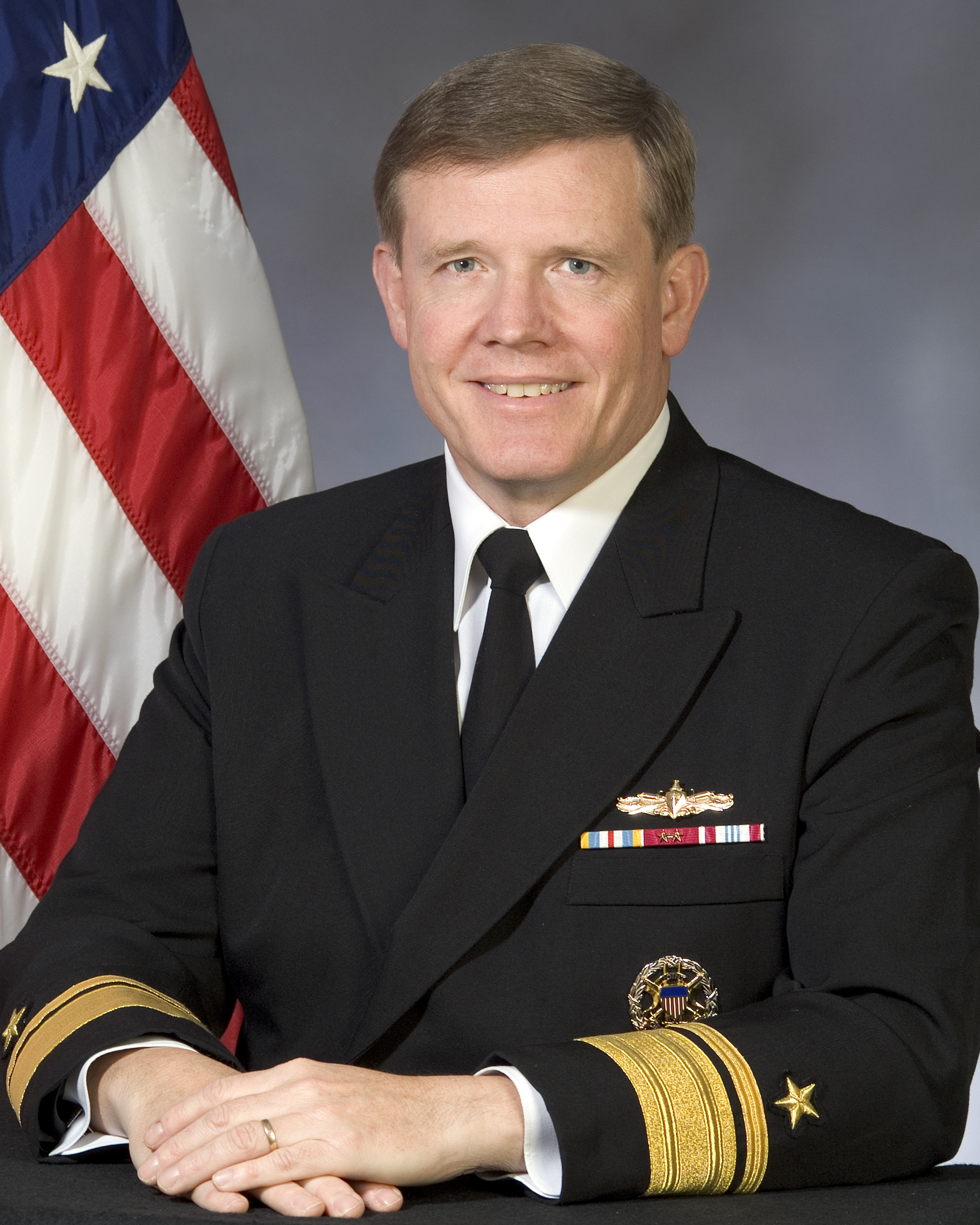
- RADM Robert D. Reilly Jr., USN (Retired)
- Born: 1953 (age 72–73); Winnetka, Illinois
- Military career
- Allegiance: United States
- Branch: United States Navy
- Service years: 1975–2010
- Rank: Rear Admiral
- Commands: Halyburton (FFG-40); Destroyer Squadron Fifty; Cruiser Destroyer Group Two; Harry S. Truman Carrier Strike Group (CSG-10); Military Sealift Command

Rear Admiral Robert Dunham Reilly Jr. (born 1953) was a United States Navy Surface Warfare Flag Officer who retired from active duty in January 2010 after 34-plus years of military service. His last assignment was as the 24th commander of the U.S. Navy's Military Sealift Command (MSC).

== Biography ==
Reilly, a native of Winnetka, Illinois, is a graduate of New Trier High School's West Campus. He comes from a family with more than a century of service in the United States armed forces including his great grandfather Army Captain Henry Joseph Reilly and grand uncle Army Brigadier General Henry Joseph Reilly, Jr. Commissioned in 1975 through the Naval Reserve Officer Training Corps, he first served aboard the Forrest Sherman-class destroyer Edson as Electronic Material Officer, Combat Information Center Officer and Damage Control Assistant.

His other shipboard tours included commissioning the Spruance-class destroyer Fletcher as its first Operations Officer; Engineering Officer aboard the Belknap-class cruiser Sterett; Executive Officer of the Spruance-class destroyer John Young; and as Commanding Officer of the Oliver Hazard Perry-class frigate Halyburton.

Reilly's additional operational tours at sea included duties as Flag Secretary, Cruiser Destroyer Group One, where he participated in the western Pacific and Southwest Asia deployments of the New Jersey and Missouri Battleship Battle Groups, and the Midway Carrier Battle Group; and command of Destroyer Squadron Fifty (COMDESRON 50), homeported in the Kingdom of Bahrain. He also commanded Cruiser Destroyer Group Two and the Harry S. Truman Carrier Strike Group (CSG-10).

Ashore, Reilly served as Operations Readiness Assessment Officer, Commander, U.S. Pacific Fleet staff in Pearl Harbor, Hawaii; Surface Warfare and Weapons Procurement Analyst, Program Resource Appraisal Division (N81), Office of the Chief of Naval Operations; Surface Warfare Junior Officer Assignment Branch Head (PERS 412), Bureau of Naval Personnel; Joint Operations Division Pacific Command Division Chief, Joint Staff (J3); Director, Environmental Readiness, Chief of Naval Operations (CNO N45); and as Deputy Assistant Chief of Naval Operations for Information Technology (CNO N098) and Department of the Navy Deputy Chief Information Officer (Navy).

Reilly assumed command of the Military Sealift Command in March 2006. During his tenure MSC returned nearly $1 billion to the Navy’s budget through improved business practices; won awards for contracting excellence, competitive procurement, small business, safety and environmental responsibility; improved energy efficiencies; placed additional helicopter detachments aboard U.S. navy fleet logistics ships, saving $700 million in cost avoidance over 20 years; deployed the U.S. Navy's two hospital ships USNS Comfort and USNS Mercy on five humanitarian and civic assistance missions treating more than 370,000 patients in 25 countries; evacuated 6,700 U.S. citizens from Beirut to safety in 2006; and delivered 20,000,000 square feet (1,900,000 m^{2}) of combat equipment and supplies and 8 billion US gallons (30,000,000 m^{3}) of fuel to U.S. and coalition forces ashore in Iraq and Afghanistan with a 98 percent on-time delivery record.

Reilly earned a Bachelor of Arts degree in Political Science from the University of Washington, and a Master's in Public Administration (National Resources) from the George Washington University. He is also a 1993 graduate of the Industrial College of the Armed Forces.

Medals and Awards:

Navy Distinguished Service Medal, Defense Superior Service Medal, Legion of Merit with three Gold Stars, Defense Meritorious Service Medal, Navy Meritorious Service Medal with two Gold Stars, Navy and Marine Corps Commendation Medal with one Gold Star, Navy Unit Commendation, Meritorious Unit Citation with two Bronze Stars, Navy "E" Ribbon, National Defense Service Medal with two Bronze Stars, Armed Forces Expeditionary Medal, Southwest Asia Service Medal with one Bronze Star, Humanitarian Service Medal with two Bronze Stars, Sea Service Deployment Ribbon with one Silver Star and one Bronze Star, Navy and Marine Corps Overseas Service Medal, Republic of Korea Presidential Unit Citation, Global War on Terror Service Medal, Armed Forces Service Medal
