= Anne B. Real =

- Anne B. Real
- Directed by: Lisa France
- Written by: Antonio Macia
- Produced by: Luis Moro
- Starring: Janice Richardson; Carlos Leon; Ernie Hudson
- Cinematography: Stefan Forbes
- Edited by: Doug Forbes
- Music by: Dean Parker
- Production company: Luis Moro Productions
- Distributed by: Screen Media
- Release date: February 2003 (Pan African Film Festival)
- Running time: 91 minutes
- Language: English

Anne B. Real is a 2003 coming-of-age drama film directed by Lisa France and starring Janice Richardson, Carlos Leon, Ernie Hudson, and Sherri Saum. The film follows an aspiring rapper in Spanish Harlem who finds inspiration in reading The Diary Of Anne Frank. The film won a Black Reel Award for Outstanding Independent Film.

== Plot ==
A teenage girl of Hispanic heritage named Cynthia Gimenez lives in a cramped Manhattan apartment on the edge of Spanish Harlem. Her mother and grandmother speak minimal English. Her older sister is an unwed mother living on welfare. Her older brother is a drug-dealing junkie. In the course of the film, Cynthia faces chaos and betrayal. One of her friends is deliberately murdered, while another of her loved ones is accidentally shot. She runs from the police at one point, and to them at another. But through it all, Cynthia has a secret friend: Anne Frank.

In a flashback scene early in the film, Cynthia's late father gives his young daughter a dog-eared copy of The Diary Of Anne Frank and for the rest of the film Anne's words, read verbatim by Cynthia, provide both her solace and her inspiration. Cynthia buys herself a plaid notebook that looks very much like Anne's original, and she retreats to her corner, like Anne did, to record her private thoughts. “All children must look after their own upbringing,” she reads, and from these words she understands that she can either blame her surroundings and give up, or take responsibility for her own future.

She finds out that her brother is selling her poems to a rapper named ‘Deuce’ who has been performing them and recording them and claiming them as his own. But with Anne's voice in her head, Cynthia finds her courage, and by the end of the film she has transformed herself into an artist named “Anne B. Real.”

== Cast ==
- Janice Richardson as Cynthia Gimenez (as Janice Richardson aka 'JNYCE')
- Carlos Leon as Juan Juan Gimenez
- Ernie Hudson as Principal Davis
- Sherri Saum as Janet Gimenez
- Eric Smith as Deuce
- Jackie Quinones as Kitty
- Geronimo Frias as Darius
- Antonio Macia as Michael Dominguez
- David Zayas as Cynthia's dad
- Luis Moro as Tommy Morel
- Mike Starr as Ron
- Nesta Ward as Frank

== Production ==
The film was inspired by the diaries of Anne Frank. Producer Luis Moro contacted the Anne Frank Foundation in Switzerland and received permission to quote extensively from the actual text of Frank's diary.

Lisa France and Moro insisted the cast respect their intention to make a PG-rated film before they signed on. In an interview with Jan Lisa Huttner of the World Jewish Digest, France explained her reasonings for this requirement were her respect for Frank's legacy and her desire to make a film suitable for everyone, including Anne's legions of young readers: “Urban family entertainment is rare. We wanted to make a film that an 8-year old and a 90-year old could watch together and we would not feel embarrassed or uncomfortable."

Screenwriter Antonio Macia, who plays one of Cynthia’s teachers in the film, paraphrased Anne’s words in the script. According to Moro, Bernd Elias, one of Anne’s last surviving relatives and the President of the Anne Frank Foundation, was supportive.

Music was performed by R&B singer Janice "JNYCE" Richardson, who learned how to rap for the film. The end credits include the Paula Cole song by "Be Somebody".

== Release ==
Anne B. Real premiered at the Pan African Film Festival in February 2003. It subsequently screened at a variety of film festivals including Urbanworld Film Festival and the Chicago International Film Festival.

== Reception ==
Robert Koehler of Variety wrote in his review, "Imbued with street sense yet made with family-friendly limits on harsh language and violence, Anne B. Real is both a shamelessly contrived and unalterably sincere portrait of a high school girl who writes rap poetry in her Bronx 'hood." Bill Stamets of the Chicago Reader commented that Lisa France "creates some strong imagery and elicits compelling performances from her cast, and though redundant flashbacks betray a lack of trust in the narrative, her mature touch rescues this mean-streets saga from the usual uplift cliches." Josh Ralske of AllMovie wrote, "Anne B. Real has been compared to 8 Mile. This film, however, has a more likable protagonist, unlike the monotonously sullen character played by Eminem. Cynthia seems to have passion and a lively mind even when she's not on-stage, where she's understandably not quite as convincing in her freestyle skills." However, he commented the film is "a well-meaning drama with an original premise that still gets bogged down in formulaic plotting, uneven performances, and drab visuals."

Anne B. Real was honored on SWAN Day 2026 at events in both Chicago and New York City hosted by international SWANs founder, writer and critic Jan Lisa Huttner.

According to author Suzy Switzer of FF2 Media:

Anne B. Real perfectly captures iSWANs founder Jan Lisa Huttner's vision of SWAN Day’s mission. Directed and co-written by filmmaker Lisa France, it depicts an Afro-Latina teenager named Cynthia – portrayed onscreen by Janice Richardson – who finds her voice as a rapper (an art form typically dominated by men). Anne B. Real features actual quotes from Anne Frank’s The Diary of a Young Girl. Cynthia draws upon Anne’s diary for the strength to persist despite the struggles of her own everyday life. Both Anne Frank’s words and Cynthia’s story in Anne B. Real speak to the creative and intellectual potential of young people whose lives are at risk due to the violence that surrounds them.

=== Awards and nominations ===
Year	Film Event	Award	Category	Result	Ref.
2004	Independent Spirit Award	John Cassavetes Award	Lisa France, Luis Moro	Nominated	
2004	Independent Spirit Award	Best Debut Performance	Janice Richardson	Nominated	
2004	Black Reel Awards	Black Reel Award for Outstanding Independent Film		Won	
2003	Dubrovnik International Film Festival	Best Independent Film		Won	
2003	American Black Film Festival Award	Best Performance by an Actress	Janice Richardson	Won	
2003	Santa Monica Film Festival	Best Dramatic Feature		Won	
2003	Taos Talking Pictures Film Festival	Taos Land Grant Award		Nominated	
