= Elisha Lee =

American railroad executive (1870–1933)

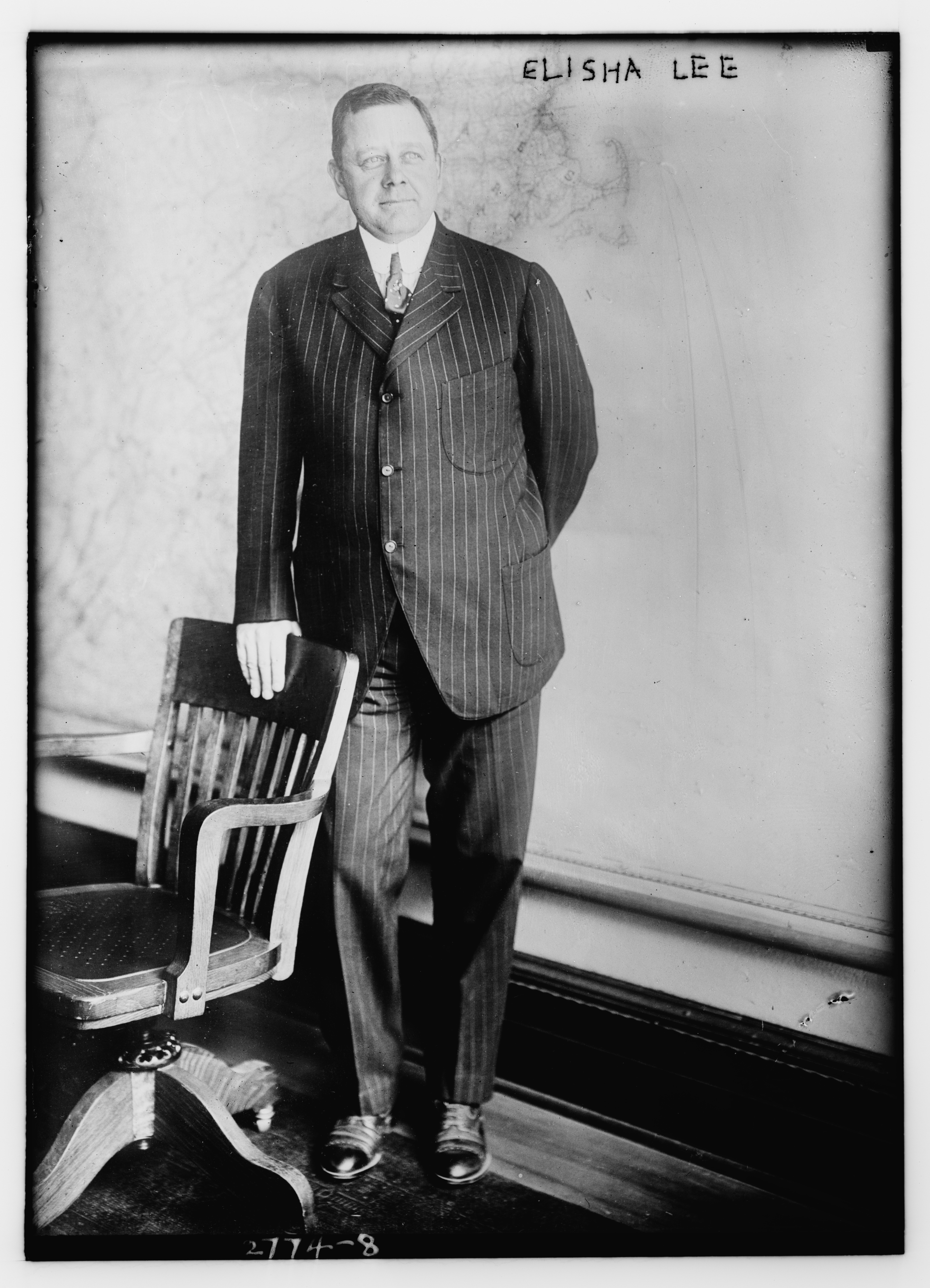
Lee circa 1913

Elisha Lee (1870 - August 6, 1933) was Vice President of the Pennsylvania Railroad and later Chairman of the Managers Committee of the Railroads.
