= 3000 Miles to Graceland =

2001 American crime film by Demian Lichtenstein

- Theatrical release poster
- Directed by: Demian Lichtenstein
- Written by: Richard Recco; Demian Lichtenstein
- Produced by: Demian Lichtenstein; Eric Manes; Elie Samaha; Richard Spero; Andrew Stevens
- Starring: Kurt Russell; Kevin Costner; Courteney Cox; Christian Slater; Kevin Pollak; David Arquette; Howie Long
- Cinematography: David Franco
- Edited by: Michael J. Duthie; Miklos Wright
- Music by: George S. Clinton
- Production company: Franchise Pictures
- Distributed by: Morgan Creek Productions, Inc. (through Warner Bros. Pictures)
- Release date: February 23, 2001 (United States)
- Running time: 125 minutes
- Country: United States
- Language: English
- Budget: $47.4 million
- Box office: $18.7 million

3000 Miles to Graceland is a 2001 American action crime film directed and co-produced by Demian Lichtenstein. The original script was written by Richard Recco, with Lichtenstein sharing a co-writing credit on the final film. The film stars Kurt Russell, Kevin Costner, Courteney Cox, David Arquette, Bokeem Woodbine, Christian Slater, Kevin Pollak and Daisy McCrackin.

Produced by Franchise Pictures and released in the United States on February 23, 2001, by Morgan Creek Productions, Inc. (through Warner Bros. Pictures), the film received mostly negative critical reviews and was a box-office bomb, making only $18.7 million against its $47.4 million budget.

== Plot ==
Recent parolee Michael Zane stops at a run-down desert motel outside Las Vegas, Nevada. He catches a boy, Jesse, stealing from his car, and chases him back to his mother, Cybil Waingrow, whom he seduces.

The next day, four men arrive to pick up Michael: Murphy, Hanson, Gus, and Franklin. Dressed in Elvis costumes, the group goes to Las Vegas and rob the Riviera, which is holding an Elvis convention. A firefight breaks out and Franklin is killed during their escape.

Back at the motel, Hanson and Murphy argue about Franklin's share until Murphy shoots and kills Hanson. Michael hides the money in the attic, unaware that Jesse is watching him. The three remaining thieves drive into the desert to bury Hanson. Murphy returns alone after shooting Gus and Michael, but hits a coyote and crashes his car, knocking him unconscious before he reaches the motel.

Michael was wearing a bulletproof vest and survived the shooting by playing dead. He makes his way back to the motel and discovers that the money is missing. Guessing that Jesse is responsible, he storms into Cybil's place and finds the money. He tries to bribe Cybil to forget the situation but eventually agrees to take Cybil and Jesse with him.

Michael explains that the money is marked, but says Murphy knows a money launderer in Idaho who can help. Murphy, realizing that Michael has taken the money, drives to Idaho to intercept him. At a restaurant, Cybil steals Michael's wallet and sneaks away from Michael and Jesse. She takes Michael's car and calls the money launderer, Peterson, using a password she found in Michael's wallet. Murphy appears at the money launderer's premises using the same password. Peterson explains that Cybil called first, so they wait for her.

Cybil arrives and finds Murphy, whom she assumes is Peterson. Michael and Jesse arrive later in a stolen car and find the premises empty except for the bodies of Peterson and his secretary. Jesse suspects that Murphy has his car, and Michael reports it stolen, leading to Murphy's arrest. The police discover that Michael is also driving a stolen car and arrest him. The men are put in adjoining cells and have a confrontation.

Jesse helps Michael make bail after Michael agrees to make him his partner. Murphy calls a man named Jack who helps him make bail and recruits a mercenary to give cover for his plan. Michael retrieves his car and finds Cybil tied up and gagged in the trunk. Murphy is picked up while hitchhiking, then kills the driver and steals his clothes and vehicle. While Cybil and Jesse are on the road, Murphy runs them off the road and takes Jesse hostage, telling Cybil to find Michael and the money. Cybil begs Michael for help. After some persuasion, Michael decides to help and reports Murphy to the authorities. Michael meets Murphy at a warehouse with the money and convinces him to release Jesse. As Murphy realizes that the bag is filled with cut-up newspaper rather than money, he is stung by a scorpion that Michael had hidden inside. A SWAT team surrounds the warehouse. Murphy pretends to surrender but grabs a gun and shoots Michael. A gunfight ensues. Murphy refuses to surrender and is killed by the police. An ambulance takes Michael for medical care, but is stolen by Cybil and Jesse. Once again, Michael wore a bulletproof vest and was only slightly injured. The three escape together and are seen on Michael's boat, the "Graceland".

== Cast ==
- Kurt Russell as Michael Zane
- Kevin Costner as Thomas Jonathan "Murphy" Liebling
- Courteney Cox as Cybil Waingrow
- Christian Slater as Hanson
- Kevin Pollak as U.S. Marshal Damitry
- David Arquette as Gus
- Jon Lovitz as Jay Peterson
- Howie Long as Jack
- Thomas Haden Church as U.S. Marshal Quigley
- Bokeem Woodbine as Franklin
- Ice-T as Hamilton
- David A. Kaye as Jesse Waingrow
- Louis Lombardi as Otto Sinclair
- Paul Anka as Pit Boss #1
- Christine Chatelain as Sexy Waitress
- Daisy McCrackin as Megan

== Production ==
The original script was written by Richard Recco. Demian Lichtenstein shared a co-writing credit on the final film.

Kurt Russell joined the film's cast in January 2000. Apparently, there were enough creative differences between Costner and Russell that the two actors were allowed to assemble their own cuts of the film to screen, with Russell focusing more on comedy and Costner's version focusing on action that reportedly saw the latter version win out.

During production, David Arquette made appearances in World Championship Wrestling (WCW) becoming the WCW World Heavyweight Champion in the process. On the WCW Monday Nitro that aired following his victory, WCW filmed Arquette on set with Courteney Cox and Russell, who laughed at Arquette being the champion.

The film's title is a reference to Graceland, the residence of Elvis Presley in Memphis, Tennessee.

== Music ==
The film's soundtrack consists of 14 tracks and was released by TVT Records on February 20, 2001.

1. "Killing Time" by Hed PE
2. "It's Gonna Kill Me" by Filter
3. "Bleeder" by Nothingface
4. "Mansion on the Hill" by Alabama 3
5. "Smartbomb" by BT
6. "In 2 Deep" by Kenny Wayne Shepherd
7. "Who's Your Uncle?" by Uncle Kracker
8. "Come in Hard" by Hardknox
9. "New Disease" by Spineshank
10. "Angel Dust" by Bender
11. "Vapor Trail" by The Crystal Method
12. "Loaded Gun" by Hednoize
13. "Franklin's Requiem" by George S. Clinton
14. "Such a Night" by Elvis Presley

== Reception ==
=== Box office ===
The film was a box-office bomb. It opened at #3 at the North American box office, earning US$7,160,521 in its opening weekend behind Down to Earth and Hannibal.

=== Critical response ===
3000 Miles to Graceland received mostly negative reviews by critics. Metacritic, which assigns a weighted average score out of 100 from reviews by mainstream critics, gave the film rating of 21 based on 30 reviews, indicating "generally unfavorable" reviews. The review aggregator website Rotten Tomatoes reported that 15% of critics gave the film a positive review based on a sample of 96 reviews, with an average score of 3.49/10, with the consensus; "While the premise sounds promising, the movie turns out to be a tedious and unnecessarily violent heist movie that's low on laughs and leaves no cliche unturned." Audiences polled by CinemaScore gave the film an average grade of "C" on an A+ to F scale.

Motion picture historian Leonard Maltin seemed to agree, citing the film as a "BOMB", writing: "Potentially clever idea degenerates into an overlong, bloody (and bloody awful) bore. All the violence is mindless; all the plot developments are brainless." Roger Ebert of the Chicago Sun-Times gave the film a mostly negative review and 1.5 stars out of a possible 4. While the cast was “top drawer right down to the supporting roles” and Ebert though Cox’s performance was a highlight, he thought the film as a whole was “a sour and mean-spirited enterprise” that tried to be both a gritty crime drama and a goofy comedy but didn’t succeed on either count.

=== Accolades ===
The film was nominated for five Golden Raspberry Awards including Worst Picture, Worst Actor (Costner), Worst Supporting Actress (Cox), Worst Screenplay, and Worst Screen Couple (Russell and either Costner or Cox) but failed to win any of those categories. The film was also nominated for five Stinkers Bad Movie Awards including Worst Picture, Worst Actor (Costner), Worst Supporting Actress, Most Annoying Fake Accent – Female (Cox), and Most Annoying On-Screen Group (The Elvis Impersonators) but failed to win any of those categories.

Year	Award	Category	Recipient(s)	Result	Ref.
2001	Golden Raspberry Awards	Worst Picture		Nominated	
2001	Golden Raspberry Awards	Worst Actor	Kevin Costner	Nominated	
2001	Golden Raspberry Awards	Worst Supporting Actress	Courteney Cox	Nominated	
2001	Golden Raspberry Awards	Worst Screenplay		Nominated	
2001	Golden Raspberry Awards	Worst Screen Couple	Russell and either Costner or Cox	Nominated	

== See also ==
- List of films set in Las Vegas
