= 2010 Kenora District municipal elections =

Elections were held in the organized municipalities in the Kenora District of Ontario on October 25, 2010 in conjunction with municipal elections across the province.

== Dryden ==
Councillor Craig Nuttall defeated incumbent mayor Anne Krassilowsky in Dryden. Brian Collins, Mel Fisher, Mike Wood, Martin MacKinnon, Ken Moss and Mary Trist were elected to council.

Mayoral Candidate	Vote	%
Craig Nuttall	1,842	55.12
Anne Krassilowsky (X)	1,500	44.88

== Ear Falls ==
Kevin Kahoot was elected mayor of Ear Falls. He is the son of Bob Kahoot, a former mayor of Keewatin. Vic Robinson, Jim Desmarais, Rob Eady and Fred Melanson were elected to council.

Mayoral Candidate	Vote	%
Kevin Kahoot	231	48.33
Tracey Simon	181	37.87
Rob Doyle	66	13.80

== Ignace ==
Lee Kennard was elected mayor of Ignace. Kim Crossley, Chicki Pesola, Larry Fraser and Alan Graver were elected to council.

Mayoral Candidate	Vote	%
Lee Kennard	651	84.22
Dianne Loubier	122	15.78

== Kenora ==
Incumbent mayor Len Compton did not run for re-election. Former mayor Dave Canfield, who was defeated by Compton in the 2006 municipal election, was re-elected as his successor. Ron Lunny, Sharon Smith, Rory McMillan, Rod McKay, Louis Roussin and Charito Drinkwater were elected to council.

Mayoral Candidate	Vote	%
Dave Canfield	4,178	62.86
Andrew Poirier	1,754	26.39
Jim Parson	715	10.76

== Machin ==
Gord Dingman defeated incumbent mayor Garry Parkes in Machin. Gordon Griffiths, Ronald Kujansuu, Dennis Peterson and Joseph Ruete were elected to council.

Mayoral Candidate	Vote	%
Gordon Dingman	260	54.62
Garry Parkes (X)	109	22.90
Linda Anderson	107	22.48

== Pickle Lake ==
Roy Hoffman defeated incumbent mayor Mike Shewan in Pickle Lake. Richard Dunbabin, Janice Pickett, Graham Vaughan and John White were elected to council.

Mayoral Candidate	Vote	%
Roy Hoffman	115	58.08
Peter Mackechnie	62	31.31
Mike Shewan (X)	21	10.61

== Red Lake ==
Incumbent mayor Phil Vinet was acclaimed back into office in Red Lake. Debra Schushack, Ken Forsythe, Anne Billard, Paul Parsons, Jason Baker and Sandy Middleton were elected to council.

Mayoral Candidate	Vote	%
Phil Vinet (X)	Acclaimed	

== Sioux Lookout ==
Dennis Leney was elected mayor of Sioux Lookout. Donald Fenlon, Calvin Southall, John Bath, Doug Squires, Herb Zettel and Joyce Timpson were elected to council.

Mayoral Candidate	Vote	%
Dennis Leney	850	48.32
Doug Lawrance	695	39.51
Sue Williams	214	12.17

== Sioux Narrows-Nestor Falls ==
Incumbent mayor Bill Thompson was acclaimed back into office in Sioux Narrows-Nestor Falls. Norbert Dufresne, Gale Black, Wayne Helliar and former mayor Jerry O'Leary will serve on council.

Mayoral Candidate	Vote	%
Bill Thompson (X)	Acclaimed	
