= Harlow Jane =

American actress

- Born: Harlow Olivia Calliope Jane; February 20, 2003 (age 23); Los Angeles, U.S.
- Occupation: Actress
- Years active: 2023–present
- Parents: Thomas Jane (father); Patricia Arquette (mother)
- Relatives: Rosanna Arquette (aunt); Alexis Arquette (aunt); David Arquette (uncle); Lewis Arquette (grandfather)

Harlow Olivia Calliope Jane (born 20 February 2003) is an American television and film actress.

== Early and personal life ==
Born in Los Angeles on 20 February 2003, Jane is the daughter of actors Patricia Arquette and Thomas Jane. She initially planned to become a lawyer before focussing on acting, having developed an interest in it while studying at university in England. From an acting family, her grandfather Lewis Arquette was also an actor, and all her mother's siblings Rosanna, Richmond, David and Alexis also went into acting.

== Career ==
Jane appeared in 2022 film drama I Love Us. She also had early roles alongside her father in 2022 film Dig, and a role on Apple TV+ series High Desert as the younger version of the character Peggy played by her mother. Following these experiences she decided to only take parts for which she auditioned.

Jane appeared in the 2023 romantic comedy film She Came to Me, appearing alongside Peter Dinklage and Anne Hathaway. Jane appeared as Caroline Shaw in 2026 television drama series The Five-Star Weekend, based on the 2023 novel by Elin Hilderbrand, appearing alongside on-screen mother Jennifer Garner.

Jane has an upcoming film role in the Courteney Cox directed crime thriller film Evil Genius, based on the 2018 documentary of the same name. She also has an upcoming role in Apple TV+ series The Off Weeks alongside Ben Stiller and Jessica Chastain.

== Filmography ==
Key
†	Denotes works that have not yet been released

Year	Title	Role	Notes
2015	Texas Rising	Stephanie	
2021	I Love Us	Audrey	
2022	Dig	Jane	
2023	She Came to Me	Tereza	
2023	High Desert	Young Peggy	1 episode
2026	The Five-Star Weekend	Caroline Shaw	8 episodes
2026	Evil Genius†	Harper	
TBA	The Off Weeks†		
