= The Five-Star Weekend (TV series) =

American television series

- Release poster
- Genre: Drama
- Based on: The Five-Star Weekend by Elin Hilderbrand
- Developed by: Bekah Brunstetter
- Starring: Jennifer Garner; D'Arcy Carden; Gemma Chan; Regina Hall; Chloë Sevigny; Harlow Jane; Timothy Olyphant
- Music by: Jake Staley; Josh Kramon
- Country of origin: United States
- Original language: English
- No. of seasons: 1
- No. of episodes: 8

Production
- Executive producers: Bekah Brunstetter; Sue Naegle; Ali Krug; Minkie Spiro; Jennifer Garner; Elin Hilderbrand; Beth Schacter; Merri D. Howard
- Producer: Todd Copps
- Cinematography: David Klein; Tari Segal
- Editors: Robert Komatsu; Maura Corey; Bjørn T. Myrholt; Ryan Denmark; Nena Erb
- Production companies: Taco Night Productions; Dinner Party Productions; Universal Content Productions

Original release
- Network: Peacock
- Release: July 9, 2026 – present

The Five-Star Weekend is an American drama television series based on the 2023 novel by Elin Hilderbrand. The series stars Jennifer Garner, D'Arcy Carden, Gemma Chan, Regina Hall, Chloë Sevigny, Harlow Jane and Timothy Olyphant. It premiered on Peacock on July 9, 2026. It received positive reviews from critics. In August 2026, the series was renewed for a second season.

== Premise ==
A food blogger, Hollis (Jennifer Garner) tries to combat the loss of her husband, Matthew (Josh Hamilton) by recreating a five-star weekend getaway at her house on Nantucket with four friends from different stages in her life: her childhood friend, Tatum (Chloë Sevigny), her college friend, Dru-Ann (Regina Hall), her motherhood friend, Brooke (D'Arcy Carden), as well as a woman, Gigi (Gemma Chan), whom she recently met online. As the five friends spend the weekend together, they mature in ways they could never imagine as boundaries are pushed and secrets are exposed.

== Cast and characters ==
=== Main ===
- Jennifer Garner as Hollis Shaw, a renowned food influencer who is grieving the loss of her husband
- D'Arcy Carden as Brooke Kirtley, Hollis's motherhood best friend who is struggling with her sexuality
- Gemma Chan as Gigi Ling, a social media follower of Hollis's and a commercial airline pilot
- Regina Hall as Dru-Ann Jones, Hollis's college best friend and a sports agent
- Chloë Sevigny as Tatum McKenzie, Hollis's childhood best friend and a dry cleaners owner
- Harlow Jane as Caroline Shaw, Hollis's daughter and college student
- Timothy Olyphant as Jack, Hollis's first boyfriend when she was a teenager

=== Recurring ===
- Josh Hamilton as Matthew Shaw, Hollis' late husband and Caroline's father
- David Denman as Kyle McKenzie, Tatum's husband
- Judy Greer as Electra Undergrove, a former mom friend of Brooke
- West Duchovny as Aubrey, Tatum and Kyle's daughter
- Rob Huebel as Charlie Kirtley, Brooke's husband and a corporate lawyer
- Vella Lovell as Chelsea, Hollis' publicist
- P. J. Byrne as JB, Dru-Ann's boss
- Zoe Renee as Posey, a high-profile client of Dru-Ann's who is a professional soccer player Angel City FC
- Tory Devon Smith as John Mark, Gigi's friend and a flight attendant
- Henry Eikenberry as Dylan Leclaire, Aubrey's boyfriend and baby daddy
- Morrison Keddie as Officer Teddy Cooper, a Nantucket police officer
- Roberta Colindrez as Sunny, a Nantucket local tour guide and Brooke's love interest

== Episodes ==
No.	Title	Directed by	Teleplay by	Original release date
1	"Friday: Arrivals"	Minkie Spiro	Bekah Brunstetter	July 9, 2026
2	"Friday Night: Pajama Dance Party"	Minkie Spiro	Fernanda Coppel	July 9, 2026
3	"Saturday Morning: Shopping in Town"	Jennifer Morrison	Mackenzie Yeager	July 9, 2026
4	"Saturday Afternoon: The Spa"	Jennifer Morrison	Vivian Barnes	July 9, 2026
5	"Saturday Night: Nice Dinner Out"	Minkie Spiro	Aja Gabel	July 9, 2026
6	"Sunday Morning: Fun Surprise"	Minkie Spiro	Bixby Elliot	July 9, 2026
7	"Sunday Night: Make Your Own Pizza Party"	Jennifer Morrison	Beth Schacter	July 9, 2026
8	"Monday Morning: Departures"	Jennifer Morrison	Bekah Brunstetter & Isabella A. Rodriguez	July 9, 2026

== Production ==
=== Development ===
The series is an adaptation of the 2023 novel by Elin Hilderbrand, with Bekah Brunstetter developing, writing and executive producing the series. Beth Schacter also joined as an executive producer and writer. Sue Naegle and Ali Krug executive produce via Dinner Party Productions, with Hilderbrand also executive producing. The series is for studio Universal Content Productions, with which Dinner Party Productions has an overall deal. Minkie Spiro also serves as an executive producer and director. On August 5, 2026, Peacock renewed the series for a second season.

=== Casting ===
Jennifer Garner is an executive producer and leads the cast. In June 2025, Gemma Chan, D'Arcy Carden, Regina Hall, Chloë Sevigny, and Timothy Olyphant were cast as series regulars. The cast also includes Harlow Jane as part of the starring cast, with David Denman, Josh Hamilton, and Rob Huebel to recur. In July 2025, Judy Greer, West Duchovny, and Tory Devon Smith joined the cast in recurring capacities. In August 2025, Henry Eikenberry and Roberta Colindrez were cast in recurring roles.

=== Filming ===
Filming took place on a sound stage in Los Angeles in 2025 and in September 2025 on Nantucket.

== Release ==
The Five-Star Weekend premiered on Peacock on July 9, 2026.

== Reception ==
The review aggregator website Rotten Tomatoes reported an 90% approval rating based on 31 reviews, with an average of rated reviews of 6.6/10. The website's critics consensus reads, "The Five Star Weekend soothes and consoles the soul with a quintet of wonderful performances by seasoned actresses whose friendship and humor make viewers feel like one of the gals." Metacritic, which uses a weighted average, assigned a score of 68 out of 100 based on 19 critics, indicating "generally favorable" reviews.
