= 2014 Kenora District municipal elections =

Elections were held in the organized municipalities in the Kenora District of Ontario on October 27, 2014 in conjunction with municipal elections across the province.

== Dryden ==
Mayoral Candidate	Vote	%
Craig Nuttall (X)	1,493	43.65
Greg Wilson	1,316	38.48
Shayne MacKinnon	611	17.87

== Ear Falls ==
Mayoral Candidate	Vote	%
Kevin Kahoot (X)	267	67.09
Ron Bergman	131	32.91

== Ignace ==
Mayoral Candidate	Vote	%
Edwin Lee Kennard (X)	360	50.92
Kimberly Baigrie	347	49.08

== Kenora ==
Mayoral Candidate	Vote	%
David S. Canfield (X)	4,447	78.35
Wendy Cuthbert	1,107	19.50
Lydia Harlos	122	2.15

== Machin ==
Mayoral Candidate	Vote	%
Drew Myers	149	41.50
Gord Dingman (X)	114	31.75
Garry Parkes	96	26.74

== Pickle Lake ==
Mayoral Candidate	Vote	%
Karl Hopf	101	48.79
Graham Vaughan	78	37.68
Roy Hoffman (X)	28	13.53

== Red Lake ==
Mayoral Candidate	Vote	%
Phil Vinet (X)	717	45.24
Gary Gazankas	581	36.66
Paul Parsons	287	18.11

== Sioux Lookout ==
Mayoral Candidate	Vote	%
Doug Lawrance	1,097	61.11
Dennis Leney (X)	698	38.89

== Sioux Narrows-Nestor Falls ==
Mayoral Candidate	Vote	%
Jerry O'Leary	314	60.74
Wayne Helliar	116	22.44
Chan Motlong	87	16.83
