= PVC-1 =

2007 Colombian film by Spiros Stathoulopoulos

- Theatrical release poster
- Directed by: Spiros Stathoulopoulos
- Written by: Spiros Stathoulopoulos; Dwight Istanbulian
- Starring: Daniel Páez; Mérida Urquía; Alberto Zornoza; Hugo Pereira
- Cinematography: Spiros Stathoulopoulos
- Release dates: 22 May 2007 (Cannes Film Festival); 14 November 2008 (Colombia)
- Running time: 85 minutes
- Country: Colombia
- Language: Spanish

PVC-1 is a 2007 Colombian drama thriller film directed and co-written by Spiros Stathoulopoulos. The plot was inspired by a true story about an improvised explosive device (IED) being placed around the neck of an extortion victim. The name came from the PVC pipes used for the explosive device. This directorial debut premiered at the Cannes International Film Festival in 2007 as an official selection of the Directors' Fortnight. The 84-minute film was shot in one single continuous take without cuts using a Glidecam Smooth Shooter and a Glidecam 2000 Pro camera stabilization system. The film won numerous awards at the International Thessaloniki Film Festival. The film is based on the true story of what happened to Elvia Cortés, seven years prior.

== Plot ==
The film, set in Colombia, opens with a gang in a car, carefully looking after a certain package. The gang is led by a violent and volatile man who is only known as Benjamin. A few moments later, the gang arrives at a farm and storm the house, taking the family hostage. Benjamin then says that there is money in the house, and that the family will give it to them if they want to remain unharmed. However, Simon, the man of the house, says that they are wrong and that they are a really poor family who have never had much money. A furious Benjamin holds Simon at gunpoint, while one of his henchmen begins taking measurements of all the family member's necks, he realizes that the only person who has the "desired" measurements is Simon's wife, Ofelia. The man then takes out the package seen at the beginning of the film and opens it, revealing 2 pieces of PVC pipes and other instruments; he places the pieces around Ofelia's neck and straps them together, forming a "collar bomb". Benjamin then orders the family to lay down on their stomachs, the family complies and, a few minutes later, realize the gang is gone.

The shocked family, still asking themselves why they were attacked if they had no money, begin trying to take the device off Ofelia's neck (being completely unaware of what the device was) but are unable to do so. They find a cassette tape in the package where the device was, and play it on a stereo player. The cassette is a message left by the gang, asking for a ransom of 15 million pesos to remove the collar, and at the same time warning them not to tamper with the device or go to the police. Since the family has no money, they decide to ask help to the police anyway. They use a cellphone to call Ofelia's sister so that she in turn can call the police.

The national guard and the Colombian army react quickly and arranges a meeting with Ofelia so that they can remove the device. However, the meeting point is far away, and so the family asks a neighbor (who is also unaware of what the collar was) to drive them to the meeting point. He initially complies but then tells them to get out of the car after realizing the device is actually a bomb. The family are forced to walk, but luckily they are given a ride by a couple of men who were pushing a wagon along the train rails. Soon after, the device begins making a beeping noise, which terrorizes the family.

They eventually reach the meeting point and meet with Jairo, an officer from the national guard's bomb squad, who begins examining the device. He knows the procedure to remove it, but he lacks the proper tools and is forced to improvise with a kitchen knife, a candle, and a lighter. The process takes a long time, since the knife is not very sharp and the candle takes a long time to heat it. The army eventually arrives and sets around a perimeter, and a lot of passersby start gathering around the perimeter to watch. Ofelia, who was initially relatively calm, is now visibly distraught and has a breakdown after Jairo tells her to "excuse her for a second" to which she replies "I have no spare seconds".

Jairo eventually manages to remove a piece from the device, and finds the explosive component. He attempts to remove it but realizes it's more complicated than that when the device releases toxic fumes from a chemical detonator that was hidden inside. Jairo barely manages to avoid the fumes. Ofelia doesn't and she goes into respiratory arrest, but is helped by the paramedics on site and manages to breathe normally again. Jairo successfully removes the chemical detonator, he reports it to his CO, who congratulates him and reassures Ofelia that she will be fine, Ofelia takes his word and starts calming down. As the CO begins walking to the safe zone, the camera turns black, and an explosion is heard, Ofelia's family rush to the site and realize that despite all efforts, the bomb has detonated, killing Ofelia. Jairo can be seen lying on the floor with severe burns on his arm (although it is unknown if he is dead or just injured). The camera then moves towards Ofelia's youngest daughter, who is watching in horror from a distance. The film ends with the girl crying and asking "Why God, why?". Jairo's fate, as well as the gang's, is left unknown.

== See also ==
- Murder of Brian Wells
  - 30 Minutes or Less
  - Evil Genius: The True Story of America's Most Diabolical Bank Heist
  - Evil Genius
- One-shot film
