= List of mayors of Kenora =

This is a list of mayors of Kenora, Ontario.

== Town of Rat Portage ==
- William LeBaron Baker (1883)
- Walter Oliver (1884 - 1885)
- Thaddeus Anthony Gadbois (1886)
- James Nelson McCracken (1887 - 1888)
- William Young (1889 - 1891)
- Archibald Campbell (1892)
- James Malcolm Savage (1893 - 1894)
- George Barnes (1895 - 1896)
- William Young (1897)
- William McCarthy (1899 - 1900)
- Sir Douglas Colin Cameron (1901 - 1903)
- Algernon Sydney Horswill (1904 - 1905)

== Town of Kenora ==
- Angus Carmichael (1906)
- Charles W. Belyea (1907)
- Harding Rideout (1908 - 1910)
- D. H. Currie (1911)
- John Thomas Brett (1912 - 1914)
- Joseph Earngey (1915 - 1918)
- George A. Toole (1919 - 1923)
- John Brenchley (1924 - 1925)
- Ashton Thomas Fife (1926 - 1928)
- Earl Hutchinson (1928 - 1929)
- W. S. Carruthers (1930 - 1933)
- Thomas McClellan (1934 - 1938)
- J. P. Williams (1939 - 1942)
- A. G. Holland (1943 - 1946)
- W. G. Jay (1947 - June 1948)
- George Raymond Carmichael (1948 - 1951)
- A. R. Pitt (1952 - 1953)
- J. V. Fregeau (1954 - Feb 1957)
- P. Ratuski (Mar 1957 - 1959)
- C. A. Bergman (1960 - 1963)
- W. E. Norton (1964 - 1965)
- E. L. Carter (1966 - 1971)
- James Davidson (1971 - 1974)
- William Tomashowski (1975 - 1976)
- Udo Romstedt (1977 - 1980)
- Kelvin Winkler (1980 - 1994)
- Joyce Chevrier (1994 - 1997)
- Kelvin Winkler (1997 - 2000)

== City of Kenora ==
- Dave Canfield (2000 – 2006)
- Len Compton (December 1, 2006 – November 30, 2010)
- Dave Canfield (December 1, 2010 – November 30, 2018)
- Dan Reynard (December 1, 2018 – 2022)
- Andrew Poirier (2022 – present)
