= David Canfield =

David Canfield may refer to:

- Dave Canfield, Canadian politician
- David DeBoor Canfield (born 1950), American composer
