= Evil Genius (film) =

Upcoming drama film

- Directed by: Courteney Cox
- Written by: Courtenay Miles
- Based on: Evil Genius: The True Story of America's Most Diabolical Bank Heist by: Barbara Schroeder; Trey Borzillieri
- Produced by: Jason Bateman; Michael Costigan; John Buderwitz; Courteney Cox
- Starring: Patricia Arquette; David Harbour
- Cinematography: Eigil Bryld
- Production companies: Aggregate Films; August Night
- Release date: September 12, 2026 (TIFF)
- Country: United States
- Language: English

Evil Genius is a 2026 American independent crime thriller film directed and co-produced by Courteney Cox, based on the true-crime documentary series of the same name by Barbara Schroeder and Trey Borzillieri. The film stars Patricia Arquette and David Harbour with Michael Chernus, Garret Dillahunt, Danielle Macdonald, Tom McCarthy, Gregory Alan Williams, Ryan Eggold, Owen Teague, and Harlow Jane in supporting roles.

The film depicts the story of the death of Brian Wells, a high-profile 2003 incident often referred to as the "collar bomb" or "pizza bomber" case. The FBI investigation into his death uncovered a complex plot described as "one of the most complicated and bizarre crimes in the annals of the FBI".

Evil Genius premiered at the 2026 Toronto International Film Festival on September 12, 2026.

== Cast ==
- Patricia Arquette as Marjorie Diehl-Armstrong
  - Harlow Jane as young Marjorie Diehl-Armstrong
- David Harbour as Bill Rothstein
- Michael Chernus as Ken Barnes
- Garret Dillahunt
- Danielle Macdonald as Justine
- Tom McCarthy as Brian Wells
- Gregory Alan Williams
- Ryan Eggold
- Owen Teague
- David Arquette
- Christine Taylor
- David Rasche
- Dascha Polanco

== Production ==
In November 2025, the film's title Evil Genius was announced. Written by Courtenay Miles, it would be directed and co-produced by Courteney Cox and star Patricia Arquette and David Harbour, based on the true-crime documentary series of the same name on Netflix by Barbara Schroeder and Trey Borzillieri. Deadline Hollywood confirmed that August Night would finance and produce the film with Jason Bateman, Michael Costigan, and John Buderwitz under their Aggregate Films banner without the involvement of Netflix or Duplass Brothers Productions. Michael Chernus, Garret Dillahunt, Danielle Macdonald, Tom McCarthy, Gregory Alan Williams, Ryan Eggold, Owen Teague, and Harlow Jane joined the cast in supporting roles. David Arquette and Christine Taylor were also set to appear.

Principal photography began in November 2025, in New Jersey.

== Release ==
Evil Genius premiered at the Toronto International Film Festival on September 12, 2026.

== Reception ==
On review aggregator Rotten Tomatoes, the film holds an approval rating of 58% based on 12 reviews, with an average rating of 5.1/10. Metacritic, which uses a weighted average, assigned the film a score of 62 out of 100, based on 5 critics, indicating "generally favorable reviews".

== See also ==
- PVC-1 (2007)
- 30 Minutes or Less (2011) – An action comedy film that garnered some controversy due to similarities with the death of Brian Wells. Despite the similarities to the case, Sony Pictures Motion Picture Group said the filmmakers and cast had no prior knowledge of the incident, while the screenwriters were "vaguely familiar" with it.
