= Sue Naegle =

American business executive

Sue Naegle is an American television executive and producer, former president of HBO Entertainment, former Chief Content Officer at Annapurna Pictures, and founder of Dinner Party Productions. In 2012, Naegle was recognized as the 46th most powerful woman in the world by Forbes Magazine.

== Early life and education ==
Naegle grew up in Rockaway, New Jersey and attended Morris Hills High School. She studied comparative literature and communications at Indiana University Bloomington, where she graduated in 1991 with a Bachelor of Arts.

== Career ==
=== United Talent Agency ===
Naegle began her career in 1992 in the mail room at United Talent Agency. Two years later, she became an agent at the company, and went on to be named a partner and co-head of the TV department in 1999. At 28 years old, Naegle was one of the youngest partners at a major agency. During her tenure, she was credited with developing several successful programs, including The Bernie Mac Show and the HBO dramas Six Feet Under and True Blood.

=== HBO ===
In 2008, she was named President of HBO Entertainment, overseeing the production of all original series. At HBO, she was instrumental in shepherding such Emmy Award-winning shows as Game of Thrones, Boardwalk Empire, True Blood, Treme, Eastbound & Down, Enlightened, Veep and Girls. In August 2012, she was recognized as the 46th most powerful woman in the world by Forbes Magazine, and in the last year of her tenure, HBO won 27 Emmy Awards. After her departure from the company in 2013, she formed her own television and film production company, Naegle Ink.

=== Annapurna ===
In 2016, she was named the head of Annapurna Television, a division of Annapurna Pictures. In 2019, she was named chief content officer of Annapurna Pictures, where she oversaw TV, film, and theatre development. She was instrumental in launching Annapurna’s Theater and Television departments, fostering a supportive environment for artists and amplifying distinctive voices across both spaces. During her tenure at the company, Naegle executive produced the ten-time Emmy-nominated Hulu series Pam & Tommy, starring Sebastian Stan and Lily James; the two-time Emmy-nominated Max series The Staircase, starring Colin Firth and Toni Collette; Showtime’s I Love That For You, created by and starring Vanessa Bayer; HBO’s The Plot Against America, Amazon’s Dead Ringers, starring Rachel Weisz; and Apple TV+’s The Changeling, starring LaKeith Stanfield. Naegle also produced the Coen Brother’s The Ballad of Buster Scruggs for Netflix in 2018.

After starting Annapurna’s Theater division, she oversaw the production of several Tony Award-winning shows including Network, starring Bryan Cranston; The Lehmann Trilogy; David Byrne’s American Utopia, directed by Spike Lee; and A Strange Loop. In March 2022, Naegle departed from the company.

=== Film ===
On the film side, Naegle produced Laura Steinel’s feature directorial debut, Family, starring Taylor Schilling and Brian Tyree Henry, which premiered at the 2018 SXSW festival. She subsequently produced the adaptation of Susan Scarf Merrell’s Shirley, with Josephine Decker directing, and starring Elisabeth Moss. The film premiered at the 2020 Sundance Film Festival, with Decker winning the Special Jury Award for Auteur Filmmaking.

Naegle was an Executive Producer on Maria Schrader’s She Said with Plan B for Universal and Cory Finley’s Landscape of the Invisible Hand for MGM/Amazon.

She produced the adaptation of Rachel Yoder’s novel Nightbitch for Searchlight, directed by Marielle Heller, and starring Amy Adams.

=== Dinner Party Productions ===
In April 2024, it was announced that Naegle had signed a multiple-year overall deal with Universal Content Productions, forming Dinner Party Productions alongside producing partner Ali Krug. The company will develop and produce new projects for UCP.

Dinner Party Productions is producing Peacock’s adaptation of Elin Hilderbrand’s New York Times best-selling novel The Five-Star Weekend, with Bekah Brunstetter writing. The company will also executive produce the series adaption of New York Times bestselling author Lucy Foley’s The Midnight Feast in collaboration with Universal International Studios after the studio landed the rights in a competitive bidding war, as well as executive produce the series adaption of author Chris Whitaker's All the Colors of the Dark, in collaboration with Jenna Bush Hager's Thousand Voices Media and Sue's wife, Sarah Gubbins writing the series adaptation. Most recently, she moved their overall deal to 20th Television.

== Philanthropy ==
Naegle is a board member of Alex’s Lemonade Stand Foundation, a pediatric cancer charity that raises funding for early childhood cancer research and provides resources and support for impacted families.

She also sits on the board of Film Independent, an entertainment non-profit that works to help filmmakers realize their projects, and strives to increase inclusivity and amplify diverse voices within the film industry.

== Personal life ==
Naegle is married to writer Sarah Gubbins and has four children.
