= Lunny =

Lunny is a surname. Notable people with the surname include:

- Cora Venus Lunny, Irish musician
- Dónal Lunny (1947–2026), Irish folk musician and producer
- Manus Lunny (born 1962), Irish producer
- Olivia Lunny (born 1999), Canadian singer
- Shane Lunny
