= MS Kenora =

MS Kenora is a cruise ship that operates in Kenora, Northwestern Ontario, Canada.

== History ==
It was built in 1969, in Selkirk, Manitoba by former Riverton Boat Works in Riverton, Manitoba. It started out as a freighter supplying northern communities on Lake Winnipeg.

== Service ==
The cruise operates on Lake of the Woods and docks at Kenora's waterfront.
