= Jacques Schyrgens =

Belgian-Canadian painter and illustrator (1923–2014)

Jacques Schyrgens (8 January 1923 – 2014) was a Belgian-Canadian painter (watercolours) and illustrator.

== Life and career ==
Schyrgens was born in Elsene, Belgium on 8 January 1923. His father was Antoine Schyrgens (1890–1981), architect, draftsman, painter, teacher and a founder of the Beaux Arts Academy in Ostend. He studied at the Ecole des Beaux-Arts Ostend, and studied anatomy at Serge Mako's studio in Paris and in attended an Art College in Rome, Italy for three years. He travelled in Spain, the United States and Mexico before emigrating to Quebec in 1952.

By the end of the Second World War his family was living in the south of France where Schyrgens staged his first exhibit at age 16. The family was very much involved in the local arts community. Schyrgens recalls Henri Matisse as a neighbour. As a youth Schyrgens was attracted to 'Commercial Art' and thought little of the established traditional artists. By the late 1940s Schyrgens was living in Spain where he believes he created his best works, inspired by Gypsy culture, music and dance. The young journeyman artist also travelled throughout Mexico.

By 1952, he was living and working in Quebec City, Quebec, where he became a Canadian citizen. He painted numerous street scenes as decoration for the stately Chateau Frontenac as he was doing the same as his livelihood. Over a nine-year period in Quebec City he produced hundreds of works, some of which were eventually sold through U.S. outlets. His work attracted moderate attention. He moved to Toronto, Ontario, where Toronto street scenes became his subject matter and again he was providing art for hotels, in this case the Royal York Hotel.

In 1972, Schyrgens moved once more, becoming Kenora, Ontario's first Artist in Residence from 1972 to 1973. Sponsored with a grant from the Arts Council of Ontario for studio space, he helped found The Kenora Artists Association which numbered about 60 members and hosted studios for local artists and students. His influence had a profound effect on the local artists and he provided steady support to the neophytes who still regard him with profound respect. He uses some of this time in Kenora establishing a silk screen studio and experimented with wood and linoleum block printing which he utilized as the illustrator for a book (H.D. Thoreau, Walden or Life in the Woods) published by Poole Hall Press in 1977.

1981 found him in Winnipeg, where he established a studio and continued to produce colourful and dynamic street scenes.

Between August and September 2007, the Lake of the Woods Museum, Kenora, Ontario hosted "Kenora Paintings by Jacques Schyrgens", a 40 watercolour retrospective of his works produced there.

Schyrgens' work has produced reasonable prices at auction, and is in many private collections. Schyrgens was a member of the Artists Rights Society, and was a long-standing member of the not-for-profit organization Art Museum Image Consortium an educational resource available to universities, colleges, public libraries, elementary and secondary schools, and museums.

His work has been shown in Brussels, Amsterdam, The Hage, Paris, London, Rome, Quebec City, Montreal, Winnipeg, and Kenora. His works are on exhibition in the collection of Laval University, Quebec, and in the Kunstmuseum aan Zee, Oostende, Belgium.

Schyrgens influenced other artists, such as Michael Dobson. He died in Quebec in 2014.

== Sources ==
- Schyrgens is a listed artist at: http://daryl.chin.gc.ca:8000/SEARCH/BASIS/aich/user/www/DDW?W%3DARTIST+PH+WORDS+%27SCHYRGENS+%27+ORDER+BY+EVERY+AR/Ascend%26M%3D1%26K%3D14701%26R%3DY%26U%3D1]
- (in Dutch) N. Hostyn, Beeldend Oostende, Brugge, 1993.
- (in Dutch) J. Huys, Kunstschilder Jacques Schyrgens, in het tijdschrift "De Plate", Oostende, 2004.
