= 1973 Canadian Imperial Bank of Commerce bank robbery =

Failed bank robbery by unidentified perpetrator

- Location: 49.7673°N 94.4901°W; Canadian Imperial Bank of Commerce, Kenora, Ontario, Canada
- Date: May 10, 1973
- Target: Canadian Imperial Bank of Commerce
- Attack type: Robbery, hostage crisis
- Weapons: Rifle, pistol, homemade bomb
- Deaths: 1 (the bomber)
- Injuries: 1
- Victim: Don Millard (RCMP officer)
- Perpetrator: Unidentified man (alias Paul Higgins)
- Motive: Robbery

The 1973 Canadian Imperial Bank of Commerce bank robbery occurred in Kenora, Ontario, Canada, on May 10, 1973. A robber entered the Canadian Imperial Bank of Commerce with firearms, a bomb, and bags to hold money. Upon leaving the bank, accompanied by an undercover police officer, he was shot by a police sniper and the bomb detonated. The robber was killed and the officer injured. The robber has never been identified.

== Events ==
On May 10, 1973, a man wearing a black balaclava mask entered the Canadian Imperial Bank of Commerce in Kenora armed with a rifle, a pistol and a homemade bomb consisting of six sticks of dynamite. He held a dead man's switch in his teeth to detonate the bomb. He demanded his shoulder bag and three duffel bags be filled with money. A police officer, constable Don Millard, volunteered to pose as a getaway truck driver. As the pair carried the bags outside, a police sniper shot the robber, triggering the bomb and killing the bomber. Constable Millard was injured but partially shielded from the blast by the large duffel bag of money he was carrying, and went on to a career as a firefighter. The street was showered with over $100,000 of cash, virtually all of which was returned.

== Aftermath and mystery about bomber's identity ==
The bomber's wallet was recovered containing a pair of handcuff keys, 176 dollars, and a receipt from the Kenricia Hotel. He had checked into the hotel under the name Paul Higgins with a false address on April 23, and apparently took a bus to Winnipeg two days later. He left a steamer trunk – which also bore the name "P. Higgins" – stored at the hotel while he was gone. He checked back in on May 5. The remains of Old Port, Dutch Prince, and Teuros-Havanas cigars and cigar packages were also found in his room. The name and address he gave were followed-up with negative results.

The perpetrator wore a mask during the robbery and his features were destroyed in the explosion. Nineteen-year-old Joe Ralko, who wrote a book based on the incident, had seen the man in town in the days beforehand and described him as being in his 40s, with brown hair and a reddish-coloured beard. An initial suspect was ruled out when DNA samples from his brother did not match those taken from the crime scene, and that suspect was later found to be alive and well in France.

Joe Ralko's book, The Devil's Gap: The Untold Story of Canada's First Suicide Bomber, was released in 2017.

The unidentified man is buried in an unmarked grave in Kenora Cemetery.

The CTV News documentary show W5 profiled the Kenora bank robbery in 1983 and 2023.

== See also ==
- Brian Douglas Wells, bank robber killed by an explosive device around his neck

== Bibliography ==
Ralko, Joe: The Devil's Gap: The Untold Story of Canada's First Suicide Bomber; 2017
