= Boyacá necklace bomb incident =

2000 Colombian death by explosive device

- Part of Colombian conflict
- Location: Chiquinquirá, Boyacá Department, Colombia
- Date: 15 May 2000
- Target: Civilian (extortion victim)
- Deaths: 2
- Perpetrator: José Miguel Suárez

The Boyacá necklace bomb incident was an extortion attack that took place on 15 May 2000 in Chiquinquirá, in the Boyacá Department of Colombia. A woman named Elvia Cortés was killed after assailants locked an explosive device around her neck and demanded a ransom. The device detonated while authorities attempted to remove it, also killing a bomb disposal technician and injuring several others.

== Background ==
At the time of the incident, Colombia was experiencing widespread violence associated with the Colombian conflict, involving guerrilla groups, paramilitaries, and criminal organizations. Extortion and kidnapping were common methods used by armed groups and criminal networks to raise funds.

== Incident ==
On 15 May 2000, four armed men entered the rural home of Elvia Cortés, a dairy farmer, in Boyacá. They forced a metal collar containing explosives around her neck and demanded a ransom of approximately $7,500, warning that the device would detonate if the money was not paid.

Authorities were alerted, and police and army bomb disposal personnel attempted to defuse the device. Cortés was moved to a nearby roadside area while the operation was carried out. However, the device exploded during the attempt to remove it, killing Cortés and a bomb disposal expert and injuring several others.

== Investigation ==
Initial reports attributed the attack to the Revolutionary Armed Forces of Colombia (FARC), a guerrilla group known for extortion and kidnapping. However, responsibility was later disputed, and investigators were unable to definitively attribute the crime to a specific organization. Bomb experts noted that the device was unusually sophisticated, incorporating multiple triggering mechanisms that made it extremely difficult to deactivate.

== Aftermath and legacy ==
The incident provoked national and international outrage, and prompted Colombian President Andrés Pastrana Arango to temporarily suspend peace talks with guerrilla groups following the attack.

The case is considered one of the rare high-profile incidents of a "collar bomb" or "necklace bomb" being used. In 2007, a film PVC-1 was released and inspired by this event.

== See also ==
- Pizza bomber
