= Husky the Muskie =

Coordinates: 49.770199°N 94.497281°W

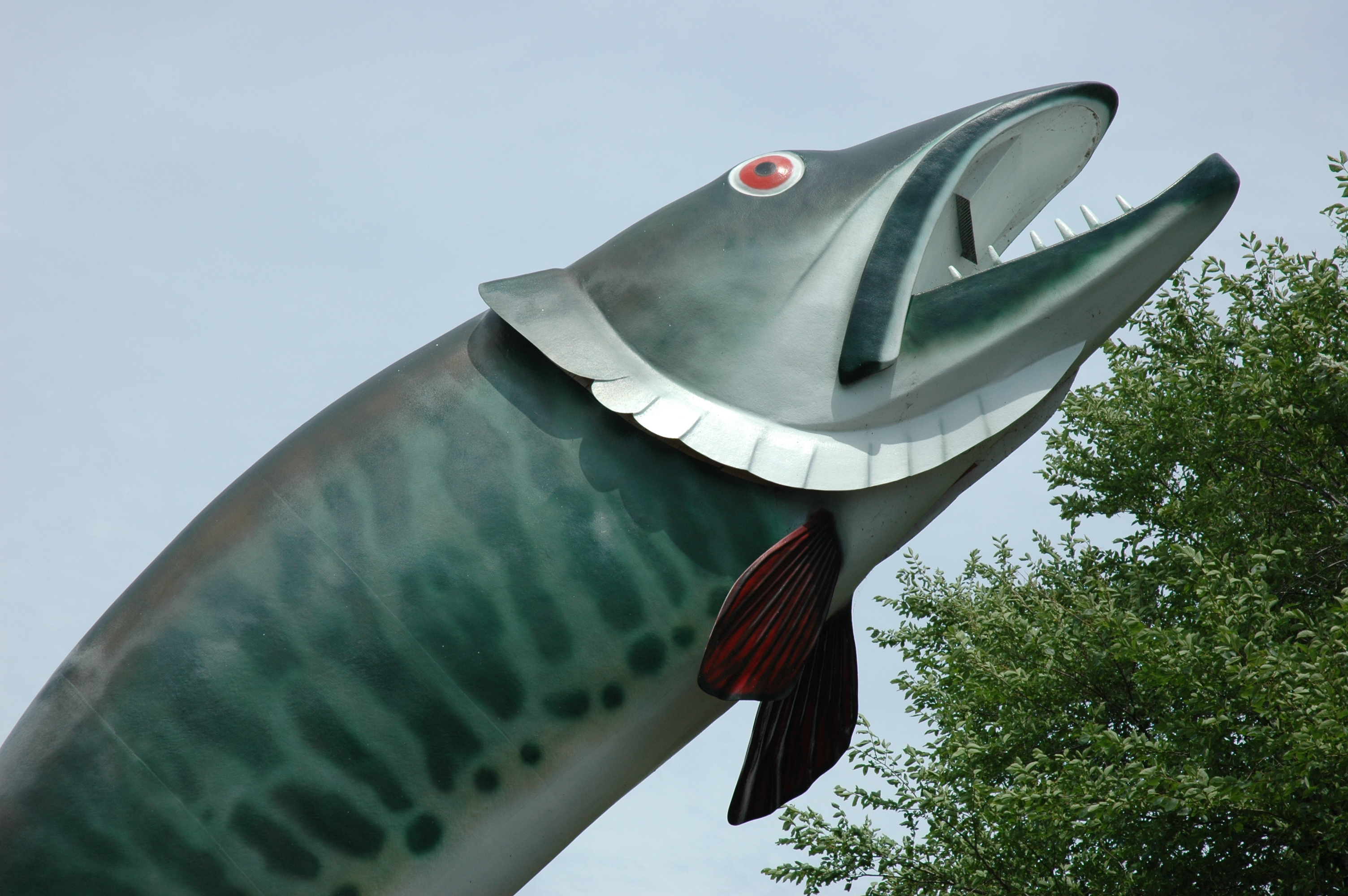
- Location: Kenora, Ontario, Canada
- Type: sculpture
- Opening date: 1967

Husky the Muskie is the nickname of a 40-foot-tall (12 m) outdoor sculpture depicting a muskellunge in Kenora, Ontario's McLeod Park. The first Husky was constructed in 1967 as a potential Canadian Centennial project by Jules Horvath and Bob Selway from Deluxe Signs and Displays under the direction of the Kenora Chamber of Commerce. Since then the sculpture has received national recognition in part due to its size and position alongside the Trans-Canada Highway. The original was rebuilt in 1995 by Ross Kehl of Perma Flex Systems.

A call to the public was made for a suitable name for the giant fish and from the hundreds of entries received the name Husky the Muskie was agreed upon by the committee. The winner was Bill Brabooke, who also included a slogan with the name which said, "Husky the Muskie says Prevent Water Pollution".

Husky appears in many movies as a sign of travel across the country, along with Max the Moose in Dryden, Ontario, and Wawa, Ontario's goose. Movies include: One Week (2008).
