= Dig (2022 film) =

2022 American film by K. Asher Levin

- Release poster
- Directed by: K. Asher Levin
- Written by: Banipal and Benhur Ablakhad
- Produced by: Robert Dean; Daniel Cummings; Courtney Lauren Penn; Jason Armstrong; Rob Goodrich
- Starring: Thomas Jane; Harlow Jane; Emile Hirsch; Liana Liberato
- Production companies: Stoked Bros Media; Walk Like A Duck Entertainment; Buffalo 8 New Mexico
- Distributed by: Saban Films
- Release date: September 23, 2022
- Running time: 89 minutes
- Country: United States
- Language: English

Dig is an American thriller film directed by K. Asher Levin from a screenplay by Banipal and Benhur Ablakhad. The film stars Thomas Jane, his daughter Harlow Jane, Emile Hirsch and Liana Liberato.

== Cast ==
- Thomas Jane as Scott Brennan
- Harlow Jane as Jane Brennan
- Emile Hirsch as Victor
- Liana Liberato as Lola

== Production ==
Principal photography was set to begin in late April 2021, in Albuquerque, New Mexico. On April 20, 2021, it was announced that filming had begun in Las Cruces, New Mexico and Doña Ana County, New Mexico.

The casting of Hirsch and Liberato was announced in June 2021, but the film was in post-production. That same month, it was announced that Screen Media Films acquired international distribution rights to the film. In November 2021, Saban Films acquired the distribution rights to the film in North America, France, Germany, Spain, and Scandinavia.

== Release ==
The film was released in theaters and on VOD on September 23, 2022.

== Reception ==
On the review aggregator website Rotten Tomatoes, 29% of 14 critics' reviews are positive, with an average rating of 4.4/10.
