= Evil Genius (TV series) =

2018 true crime docuseries

- Genre: True crime
- Based on: Death of Brian Wells
- Written by: Barbara Schroeder
- Directed by: Barbara Schroeder, Trey Borzillieri
- Narrated by: Trey Borzillieri
- Composers: Gary Lionelli; Gage Boozan
- Country of origin: United States
- No. of seasons: 1
- No. of episodes: 4

Production
- Executive producers: Mark and Jay Duplass, Josh and Dan Braun
- Running time: 45–53 minutes
- Production company: Duplass Brothers Productions

Original release
- Network: Netflix
- Release: May 11, 2018

Evil Genius: The True Story of America's Most Diabolical Bank Heist is a 2018 true crime documentary series about the death of Brian Wells, a high-profile 2003 incident often referred to as the "collar bomb" or "pizza bomber" case. It was released on Netflix as a four-part series on May 11, 2018.

== Background ==
Trey Borzillieri got the idea to make a series about a high-profile crime after watching Paradise Lost: The Child Murders at Robin Hood Hills and became captivated with the murder of Brian Wells when evidence emerged that Wells may have been forced to commit the robbery with a bomb strapped to his neck. Borzillieri began interviewing people around Erie, Pennsylvania, where the incident had occurred. In 2005, two years after Wells's death, he started corresponding with mastermind Marjorie Diehl-Armstrong, because she might have information about the cold case. He spent years investigating the case, including interacting extensively with Diehl-Armstrong while she was in prison.

The title comes from Diehl-Armstrong's supposed high intelligence. Before her mental state deteriorated due to numerous conditions, she was on her way to a career in education and counseling.

== Episodes ==
No.	Title	Original release date
1	"Part 1: The Heist"	May 11, 2018
2	"Part 2: The Frozen Body"	May 11, 2018
3	"Part 3: The Suspects"	May 11, 2018
4	"Part 4: The Confessions"	May 11, 2018

== Reception ==
Evil Genius has a rating of 80% on Rotten Tomatoes based on 30 reviews, with an average score of 6.45/10. The site's consensus reads, "Evil Genius makes up for a lack of conviction and nuance with an intriguing sense of discovery and plenty of entertaining insanity."

The Daily Telegraph's Ed Cumming gave Evil Genius 4 stars out of 5, calling it "a bizarre, grim story that sticks in the mind". Similarly, Greg Morabito reviewed the series favorably for Eater.com, concluding that "Evil Genius explores not just the evidence behind the crimes, but also the lives of the suspects, the victims, and their families." Lanre Bakare of The Guardian gave Evil Genius 3 stars out of 5, writing that the series displays "a haunting and unsettling feel as the conspiracy starts to unravel, and the motivations that drove the people who carried out the heist … become apparent." Daniel Fienberg wrote in the Hollywood Reporter that Borzillieri's dogged, intense pursuit of a given conclusion made the series intense and revealing but compromised his objectivity.

Other reviews of the show were less favorable. For example, Steve Greene of IndieWire wrote that "Evil Genius takes the idea of an interconnected web and decides to follow every thread at once, bouncing back and forth between storylines with a criminally short attention span. There's something to be discovered in this case, but the show never stays in one place long enough to get a good sense of what it's actually presenting." In another mixed review, Lincoln Michel wrote in GQ that "while Evil Genius has all the right ingredients, something about the proportions are off and the final mixture is not as compelling as it could be. Documentaries like Wild Wild Country, Making a Murderer, and Serial ignited great debates about the cases themselves, the larger societal questions, or the failures of the justice system. Evil Genius doesn't really do any of that." Nevertheless, Michel described the series as "a perfect binge for the long weekend." Jen Chaney of Vulture praised the series for telling a compelling story, while criticizing the way it portrayed Marjorie Diehl-Armstrong's mental illness.

== Film adaptation ==
A film of the same name, inspired by the series and case was announced on November 5, 2025. It will be directed by Courteney Cox and star Patricia Arquette and David Harbour.

== See also ==
- 30 Minutes or Less
- PVC-1
