= Shane Lunny =

- Born: Kenora, Ontario
- Website: www.edvolved.com

Shane Lunny is a designer and producer currently living and working in California. He is the founder and chief creative officer of Edvolved, a company designing and producing interactive, immersive and simulation learning experiences. He is also the founder and creative director for Lunny Group, a company designing and producing science centers, discovery centers, world expos (8) and Olympic pavilions and exhibits around the world.

== Exhibit design and production highlights ==
- Olympics 2010 Vancouver – BC Hydro Conservation Lab
- Olympics 2008 Beijing – Canada House
- Olympics 2006 Torino – BC-Canada Place
- The Dinosaur World Tour – Ex-Terra Foundation Edmonton. World's largest touring exhibition featuring specimens from China’s Gobi desert. Produced the shows animated host “Gobi” as well as more than twenty interactives that were the communications core of the exhibit
- Expo 2005 Japan Canada Pavilion – voted “Most Popular Pavilion” (NHK-TV) “Top Ten Tech” and highest attendance. Lunny Group was responsible for productions of all elements of the Pavilion
- Largest Science Center in the Middle East (Saudi Arabia)
- Singapore Discovery Center
- Expo 2000 Hanover, Germany: Won contracts in open competition to create over 50 interactive exhibits that were the core of the Humankind and Energy Pavilions
- 1988 World Expo – United Nations Pavilion Brisbane Australia
- 1987 UN World HQ New York “It Can’t be Done” Animatronic based interactive exhibit first use of laser video discs as a timing and control device
- First computer based Interactive exhibit/custom UI – 1986 Vancouver World Expo United Nations Pavilion “Is Einstein Wrong” featuring Carl Sagan and Gwynne Dyer

== Education ==
While attending a 3-year Communications Arts course at Confederation College Lunny became friends with Norm Foster and the two co-wrote a 65 episode comedy radio series The Ordinary Social Worker which was broadcast by the CBC and became a cult hit with University students. Norm and he both left college to be employed in their chosen media before their first year was completed.

He developed the first game based ESL writing learning program Edubba along with Maria Klawe and the University of British Columbia Linguistics faculty.

Lunny designed and produced a large suite of e-learning products in partnership with the Government of Canada which were distributed to schools nationwide. Software BioMars (Careers in Biotechnology), The Missing Link (Careers in Software), Careers in Culture, Careers in Construction, and Woodlinks.

== Sources ==
- Waterhouse-Hayward, Alex. "Shane Lunny - Cyrano de Bergerac On Fast Forward".
- Ratner, Jonathan. "CHUM kept pushing the envelope". Financial Post.
- Friesen, Corinne. "Entrepreneur Tips From the Top".
- Parry, Malcolm. "Vancouver Celebrities: December 2008".
