= Pizza bomber =

2003 American death by explosive collar

Brian Wells
- Wells' driver's license photo
- Born: November 15, 1956; Warren, Pennsylvania, U.S.
- Died: August 28, 2003 (aged 46); Erie, Pennsylvania, U.S.
- Cause of death: Homicide via collar bomb explosion
- Occupation: Pizza delivery driver

On August 28, 2003, pizza delivery man Brian Douglas Wells robbed a PNC Bank near his hometown of Erie, Pennsylvania, United States. Upon being apprehended by police, Wells died when an explosive collar locked to his neck detonated. The FBI investigation into his death uncovered a complex plot later described as "one of the most complicated and bizarre crimes in the annals of the FBI".

In conjunction with the Bureau of Alcohol, Tobacco, Firearms and Explosives (ATF) and the Pennsylvania State Police (PSP), the FBI investigation led to Marjorie Diehl-Armstrong and Kenneth Barnes being charged with the crime in 2007. The investigation determined the plot was masterminded by Diehl-Armstrong to receive an inheritance by hiring Barnes with the money from the bank robbery to kill her father. William Rothstein and Floyd Stockton were also found to have conspired in the crime, but Rothstein died before being charged and Stockton was granted immunity in exchange for testifying against Diehl-Armstrong. Diehl-Armstrong was sentenced in 2011 to life imprisonment without the possibility of parole and Barnes received a reduced sentence of 22 1/2 years in exchange for testifying against Diehl-Armstrong; both died in prison.

Wells' involvement in the plot is a matter of controversy. Investigators concluded Wells was a willing participant in the robbery, but was told the bomb was fake. Wells' family said he was forced to rob the bank by the conspirators. Known as the collar bomb case or pizza bomber case, the incident gained extensive media coverage, including the 2018 Netflix series Evil Genius and an upcoming film of the same name.

== Background and motives ==
=== Brian Wells ===
Brian Wells grew up in Erie, Pennsylvania, as one of six children. In 1973, when Wells was a 16-year-old sophomore, he dropped out of East High School in Erie and went to work as a mechanic. He was described as "childlike". At the time of the bank robbery, he had been working at Mama Mia's Pizzeria for at least ten years.

=== Conspiracy ===
At Kenneth Barnes' home, he, Marjorie Diehl-Armstrong, and William Rothstein discussed ways they could make money. Diehl-Armstrong suggested Barnes kill her father, Harold Diehl, so she would receive an inheritance. Barnes told her he was willing to do this for $250,000 (equivalent to $438,000 in 2025). The collar bomb-bank robbery plot was hatched to obtain enough money to pay Barnes to kill Diehl-Armstrong's father. (Note: The inheritance Diehl-Armstrong reportedly coveted was ultimately denied to her. Her father's estate had once been valued about $1.8 million, but gifts to friends had lowered the value to less than $120,000 at his death in January 2014, at the age of 95. In an interview, Harold Diehl reported he had cut off financial support for his daughter decades earlier due to her criminal behavior and failure to hold a steady job. His last will and testament left $2,000 to Diehl-Armstrong, but the estate's obligation to pay outstanding medical bills before inheritances meant she received nothing.) In return for a reduced sentence, Barnes later told investigators that Diehl-Armstrong was the mastermind of the crime and that she wanted the money to pay Barnes to kill her father, who she reportedly believed was squandering her inheritance.

Diehl-Armstrong had a history of suffering from multiple mental illnesses including bipolar disorder. Before her mental health deteriorated in her twenties, Diehl-Armstrong was an "exemplary student" in high school and earned a master's degree from Gannon College. In 1984, she killed her boyfriend Robert Thomas by shooting him six times as he lay on the couch; she was subsequently acquitted of murder, claiming it was self-defense. Her husband and several other partners also died under suspicious circumstances. Diehl-Armstrong died from breast cancer in prison at age 68 on April 4, 2017.

Barnes was a retired television repairman, crack cocaine dealer, and Diehl-Armstrong's "fishing buddy". He suffered from diabetes and died in prison of small-cell lung cancer that had spread to his brain on June 20, 2019, at the age of 64–65.

Rothstein dated Diehl-Armstrong in the late 1960s and early 1970s. He was implicated in a 1977 murder after he gave a handgun to a friend who used it to murder a romantic rival; he later attempted to destroy the weapon but was granted immunity from prosecution in exchange for his testimony. Rothstein was a handyman and part-time shop teacher, and was part of a group called the "fractured intellectuals"— intelligent people who were not well-adjusted. Rothstein was admitted to the Millcreek Community Hospital on July 23, 2004, having previously been diagnosed with non-Hodgkin's lymphoma showing diffuse, large-cell type myeloproliferative lymphoma, and died on July 30 that year at the age of 60. Rothstein was the putative creator of the collar bomb.

Floyd Stockton was a convicted rapist of a disabled teenager and lived as a fugitive at Rothstein's house. He was granted immunity for his testimony against Diehl-Armstrong, but was never called to testify in court due to illness. Stockton died of acute respiratory failure in Bellingham, Washington on August 10, 2022, at the age of 74–75. His death was ruled accidental, and the offices could not provide any further details.

=== Conspirators' connection to Wells ===
Immediately after his death, investigators searched Wells' house and found a list of people he knew which included the names of two prostitutes unknown to other members of his family. One of the prostitutes he frequented knew Kenneth Barnes, who dealt crack and whose house was used by prostitutes.

=== Wells as conspirator ===
According to law enforcement reports, Wells participated in the planning of the bank robbery the day before and was aware of the complex plot; he believed the bomb would be fake but would serve as exculpatory evidence if he were caught. According to an FBI affidavit, two witnesses confirmed that Wells talked about the robbery about a month before it occurred. Wells was seen leaving Rothstein's house the day before the incident, and investigators believe he participated in a rehearsal. It was believed Wells was killed to reduce the number of witnesses.

Wells' family and friends dispute his involvement in the bank robbery and his own death; according to them, Wells was accosted at gunpoint and forced to wear the bomb.

Jessica Hoopsick, a woman who was Wells' friend, confessed in the Netflix documentary Evil Genius that she set Wells up to participate in the crime by providing his name and delivery schedule to one of the conspirators in exchange for money and drugs. She said he had no knowledge of the robbery.

== Robbery and death ==
Key locations around Erie
1 Mama Mia's Pizzeria
2 Pizza delivery site
3 PNC Bank

=== Collar bomb ===
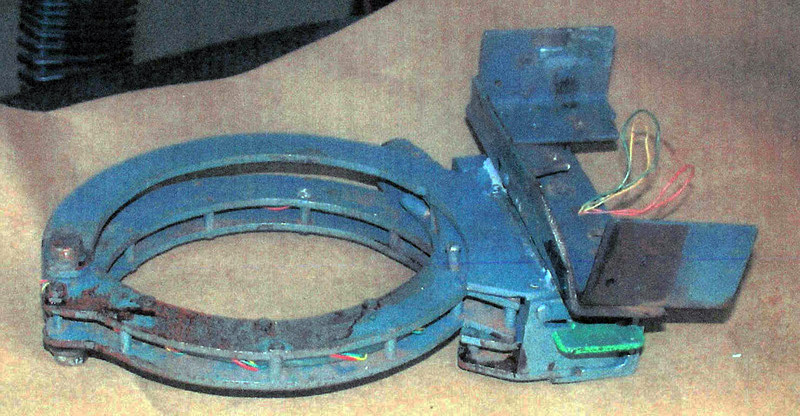
Triple-banded metal collar that was locked around Wells' neck, holding a bomb that ultimately killed him

The bomb used in the killing consisted of a hinged collar that worked like a large handcuff to go around the neck, four keyholes that went under the chin, and a rectangular housing unit containing two pipe bombs and two kitchen timers. One electronic timer hung down over the chest. The device had several decoys, such as unconnected wires, a toy cell phone, and deceptive warning stickers.

=== Pizza delivery ===
For 10 years, Wells worked as a pizza delivery driver at Mama Mia's Pizzeria in Erie until his death. Just after 1:30 p.m. on August 28, 2003, the pizzeria received a call from a payphone at a nearby gas station. The owner could not understand the customer and transferred the call to Wells, who was instructed to deliver two pizzas to 8631 Peach Street, an address a few miles from the pizzeria. The address was the location of the transmitting tower of WSEE-TV at the end of a dirt road.

According to law enforcement, upon arriving at the television tower, Wells found the plot had changed and learned the bomb was real. Wells' family disputes this account of the events at the television tower; according to them, Wells was accosted at gunpoint by strangers and forced to participate. The details of events at the tower that led to the bomb being attached to Wells' neck have never been firmly established, but evidence suggests there was a struggle and that Barnes, Diehl-Armstrong, Rothstein, and Stockton were all present at that time.

In interviews by law enforcement, Stockton claimed to be the one to put the bomb around Wells' neck. When Wells discovered that the bomb was real, Barnes said a pistol was fired in order to force Wells' compliance, and witnesses confirmed hearing a gunshot. After the bomb was applied, Wells was given a sophisticated home-made shotgun, which had the appearance of an unusually shaped cane.

Wells was instructed to claim that three black men had forced the bomb on him and were holding him as a hostage.

=== Scavenger hunt ===
Inside Wells' car, police found nine pages of handwritten instructions addressed to "Bomb Hostage", directing him to rob the bank. The instructions also included a scavenger hunt, listing a series of strictly timed tasks for collecting keys that would delay detonation and eventually defuse the bomb. The pages warned that Wells would be under constant surveillance and any attempts to contact authorities would result in the bomb's detonation. "ACT NOW, THINK LATER OR YOU WILL DIE!" was scrawled at the bottom of the instructions.

=== Robbery ===
Wells was instructed to "quietly" enter the PNC Bank at Summit Towne Center on Peach Street and give the teller an affixed note demanding $250,000, and to use his shotgun to threaten anyone who did not cooperate or attempted to flee. Upon entering the bank around 2:30 p.m., Wells slid the note to a teller. The note stated the bomb would explode in 15 minutes and that the full amount must be handed over within that time. The teller was unable to access the vault quickly and gave Wells a bag containing $8,702 and exited the bank.

At 2:38 p.m., a witness called 9-1-1 from the bank and reported a male leaving the bank with "a bomb or something wrapped around his neck". This is the first-known emergency call for the incident. According to witnesses at the bank and surveillance footage, after entering the bank, Wells waited in line. When he reached the counter, he began sucking a lollipop. He appeared confident as he left the bank, swinging his cane gun and the bag of money "like Charlie Chaplin" according to one witness.

=== Arrest and death ===
Around 15 minutes after Wells left the bank, he had completed the first task of the scavenger hunt. He was proceeding with the second task when police saw him standing outside his automobile and promptly arrested him, handcuffed him and left him sitting on the ground in the parking lot of a nearby business, Eyeglass World. Wells said three unnamed black people had placed a bomb around his neck, provided him with the shotgun, and told him they would kill him unless he committed the robbery and completed several other tasks.

The responding police officers did not attempt to disarm the device; they focused on clearing the immediate area of pedestrians and ensuring Wells could not detonate the device. The bomb squad was first called at 3:04 p.m., at least 30 minutes after the first 9-1-1 call from the bank and about 10 minutes after Wells was arrested. At 3:18 p.m., three minutes before the bomb squad arrived, the bomb detonated and blasted a fist-sized hole in Wells' chest, killing him in seconds. Traffic congestion in the area delayed the bomb squad's arrival but personnel from the ATF still considered their response appropriately quick.

== Aftermath and subsequent developments ==
WJET-TV, Erie's ABC affiliate, broadcast the event live on the air, but did not show the moment of the detonation due to a technical problem. The station provided the footage to FBI investigators, ABC's head office, and sister station WKBW-TV in Buffalo, New York. The footage was subsequently leaked to shock jock Elliot Segal of DC101, a radio station in Washington, D.C. who posted it on his website in September 2003. Although he subsequently removed the video at WJET's request, by then it had been posted to numerous video-sharing websites.

Though the note claimed Wells would gain extra time by each key found, police later traveled the note's route and could not complete it in the allotted time, implying Wells would not have had enough time to get the bomb defused. The collar of the bomb was still intact so authorities were forced to sever Wells' head from his body so the bomb could be retained and investigated.

=== Murder of James Roden ===
On September 20, 2003, Rothstein, who lived near the television tower, called police to inform them the body of a man, James Roden, was hidden in a freezer in a garage at his house. After he telephoned police, Rothstein wrote a suicide note indicating his planned death had nothing to do with Wells. Investigators do not believe Rothstein ever attempted suicide.

Roden had been living with Diehl-Armstrong for 10 years. In custody, Rothstein claimed Diehl-Armstrong had murdered her then-boyfriend Roden with a 12-gauge shotgun during a dispute over money. Rothstein said she subsequently paid him $2,000 to help hide the body and clean the crime scene at her house.

Rothstein died of cancer on July 30, 2004 at the age of 60 before a federal grand jury handed up the indictments.

In January 2005, Diehl-Armstrong pleaded guilty but mentally ill to third degree murder and abuse of a corpse for killing Roden. She was sentenced to between 7 and 20 years in prison. She is believed to have killed Roden to prevent him from informing authorities about the robbery plot.

=== Diehl-Armstrong and Barnes charged ===
In April 2005, Diehl-Armstrong told a state trooper she had information about the Wells case and after meeting with FBI agents, said she would tell them everything she knew if she was transferred from the Muncy Correctional Institution to a minimum-security prison in Cambridge Springs. During a series of interviews, Diehl-Armstrong admitted to providing the kitchen timers used for the bomb, stated Rothstein masterminded the plot, and that Wells had been directly involved in the plan.

In late 2005, Barnes, who was in jail on unrelated drug charges, was turned in by his brother-in-law after revealing details of the crime to him. In July 2007, U.S. Attorney Mary Beth Buchanan announced Diehl-Armstrong and Barnes had been charged with the crime, with Diehl-Armstrong as the mastermind. The deceased Rothstein and Wells were named as un-indicted co-conspirators. Buchanan stated Wells had been involved in the plot from the beginning but that his co-conspirators fitted him with a real bomb that would have exploded even if it were removed.

On September 3, 2008, Barnes pleaded guilty to conspiring to rob a bank and to aiding and abetting. On December 3 that year, he was sentenced to 45 years in prison by a federal judge in Erie for his role in the crime. Barnes's sentence was later reduced to 22.5 years after he testified against Diehl-Armstrong.

=== Diehl-Armstrong trial ===
On July 29, 2008, U.S. District Court Judge Sean J. McLaughlin made an initial finding that Diehl-Armstrong was mentally incompetent to stand trial due to a number of mental disorders, indicating this ruling would be reviewed after she had received a period of treatment in a mental hospital. Diehl-Armstrong was then transferred for treatment to a federal mental-health facility in Texas. On February 24, 2009, Judge McLaughlin scheduled a hearing for March 11, 2010, to determine whether Diehl-Armstrong was now competent to stand trial. On September 9, the judge determined she was now competent. In October 2010, Diehl-Armstrong took the stand to testify on her own behalf as part of her defense. She asked for a change of venue, arguing extensive media coverage of the case prevented her from receiving a fair trial in Erie. Judge McLaughlin denied this request, noting while the allegations were unusual, "the [news] coverage as a whole has been about as factual and objective as it could be under the circumstances".

On November 1, 2010, Diehl-Armstrong was convicted of armed bank robbery, conspiracy to commit armed bank robbery, and of using a destructive device in a crime. On February 28, 2011, she was sentenced to life in prison, to be served consecutively with the prison term imposed in 2005 for killing Roden. In November 2012, the Court of Appeals for the Third Circuit affirmed her conviction. In January 2013, the U.S. Supreme Court denied her petition for certiorari, declining to hear her case. In December 2015, Diehl-Armstrong lost a second appeal of her conviction.

=== Hoopsick confession ===
In 2018, Jessica Hoopsick admitted to her involvement in the plot. Melissa Chan of Time wrote; "Hoopsick says a conspirator approached her to find a 'gopher' who could be scared into robbing the bank". In the 2018 documentary Evil Genius, Hoopsick identifies the conspirator as Barnes and alleges she recommended Wells, whom she described as "a pushover".

Admitting to setting up Wells in exchange for money and drugs, Hoopsick expressed regret for her role and said Wells had no advance knowledge of the robbery. ATF agent Jason Wick stated Hoopsick was uncooperative in 2003 and that authorities "always believed that [she] knew more" about the case; however, Wick also expressed concern Hoopsick might not be a credible witness.

== Media attention ==
As the case continued to develop, the investigation garnered national media coverage in America. Less than two years since the September 11 attacks, many at first believed the incident to be terrorism-related. Fox's America's Most Wanted featured the story three times and publicized newly released evidence in hopes officials could obtain new clues in the case.

Due to its novelty and complexity, the story retains a fascination for many people. The January 2011 issue of Wired magazine covered the story. In 2012, investigator Jerry Clark and journalist Ed Palattella published Pizza Bomber: The Untold Story of America's Most Shocking Bank Robbery, a true-crime book detailing the events. In May 2018, Netflix released Evil Genius: The True Story of America's Most Diabolical Bank Heist, a documentary series about the case.

A collection of news articles that reported developments in the Wells story was analyzed in a scientific study of information novelty.

== In fiction ==
The 2011 American comedy film 30 Minutes or Less depicts a pizza delivery man being forced to wear a bomb vest and rob a bank, with the mastermind seeking the money to hire a hitman to kill his father and receive his inheritance. The film's similarity to the Wells case was criticized by Wells' family, but Sony Pictures Motion Picture Group said the cast and crew were not aware of the Wells case and the screenwriters were only "vaguely familiar" with it.

In the 2021 TV drama Murder Diary episode 22–24, police explosive ordnance disposal team members mention the 8631 Peach St address and the pizza bomber case in their simulation training, and later were called to defuse neck collar bombs that were placed on two hostage victims.

In the TV show The Rookie Season 5, Episode 8, titled "The Collar" (2022), Officers Nolan and Juarez encounter a series of victims forced to wear explosive neck collars and one explodes after being apprehended by the police.

In 2023, Erie area resident David Durst wrote and directed "The Pizza Bomber Play, a Devoted Surrender". The play was well received and because of its focus on the dangers of untreated mental illness (bipolar disorder), $7,000 from ticket proceeds were donated to the NWPA Mental Health Association. The production's popularity spawned an encore production in 2025. On May 4, 2026, Durst released an eBook novella expanding his play's fictionalized story, "The Other Evil Genuis: His Side of the Pizza Bomber Story", digging deeper into Bill Rothstein's psyche.

== See also ==
- List of unusual deaths in the 21st century
- 1973 Canadian Imperial Bank of Commerce bank robbery, in which a bank robber was killed due to an explosive device
- Boyacá necklace bomb incident, a 2000 extortion attempt using a collar bomb which resulted in two fatalities
- Mosman bomb hoax, a 2011 extortion attempt using a fake collar bomb
