= 30 Minutes or Less =

2011 film by Ruben Fleischer

- Theatrical release poster
- Directed by: Ruben Fleischer
- Screenplay by: Michael Diliberti
- Story by: Michael Diliberti; Matthew Sullivan
- Produced by: Stuart Cornfeld; Ben Stiller; Jeremy Kramer
- Starring: Jesse Eisenberg; Danny McBride; Aziz Ansari; Nick Swardson; Michael Peña; Fred Ward
- Cinematography: Jess Hall
- Edited by: Alan Baumgarten
- Music by: Ludwig Göransson
- Production companies: Columbia Pictures; Media Rights Capital; Red Hour Productions
- Distributed by: Sony Pictures Releasing
- Release date: August 12, 2011
- Running time: 83 minutes
- Country: United States
- Language: English
- Budget: $28 million
- Box office: $40.7 million

30 Minutes or Less (stylized onscreen as 30:Minutes or Less) is a 2011 American action comedy film directed by Ruben Fleischer, starring Jesse Eisenberg, Danny McBride, Aziz Ansari, Nick Swardson, Michael Peña, and Fred Ward. Stuart Cornfeld, Ben Stiller, and Jeremy Kramer produced the film.

The story follows a pizza delivery boy who is strapped with a bomb and forced to, with the help of his friend, rob a bank in exchange for disarming it.

30 Minutes or Less was released on August 12, 2011, by Sony Pictures Releasing. The film received mixed reviews from critics, and grossed $40 million against its $28 million budget. It garnered some controversy due to the plot containing similarities with the death of Brian Wells.

== Plot ==
Nick Davis is a pizza delivery driver in Grand Rapids who rarely completes the "30 Minutes or Less" policy, which leads to him being reprimanded by his boss. Nick's school teacher friend Chet discovers that he slept with his twin sister Kate on their high school graduation night, causing him to end their friendship. Nick soon learns that Kate is planning to take up a job in Atlanta.

Buddies Dwayne Mikowlski and Travis Cord are miserable, living under the shadow of Dwayne's domineering father, Jerry "The Major", who won over $10 million in the lottery about 10 years prior. Dwayne confides in lap-dancer Juicy about his contempt for his father and his presumed inheritance.

Dwayne and Travis devise a plot to kidnap a complete stranger, to strap a bomb to his chest, and get him to get them hitman money. They order a pizza and wait for a driver to come to their hideout. When Nick arrives, Dwayne and Travis assault him, knocking him unconscious.

When Nick awakes, he is strapped into a vest rigged with explosives, with both a timer and phone-activated detonators. The bomb will explode unless he gets them $100,000 within ten hours, and they also threaten to detonate the bomb if he notifies the police. Nick finds Chet working at his school, alerts him of the situation, so he reluctantly agrees to help him rob a bank. En route, Nick goes to say goodbye to Kate and quit his job, unaware that Dwayne and Travis are tailing him.

Nick and Chet steal a Datsun, then hold up the bank and flee quickly, despite someone being prematurely shot in the leg. Dwayne says he and Travis will meet Nick at an abandoned rail yard to make the exchange, but go to a restaurant. Instead, Dwayne calls Juicy to send the hit-man.

Juicy and the hit man Chango arrive to pick up the money, but do not have the bomb deactivation code. Chet appears and knocks out Chango with a metal bar while Nick incapacitates Juicy. The two grab the money and escape.

Frustrated by the turn of events when Nick refuses to answer the phone again, Dwayne activates the speed dial number on his phone for the bomb to explode, but Travis had altered the number. Rethinking their plan, he and Travis head to Kate's apartment in their masks and kidnap her. Chango breaks into the Major's house, the Major attacks him with a pen gun, but is shot by Chango after a struggle. Chango then finds a hand-drawn map to the scrapyard. Dwayne threatens to kill Kate unless Nick meets up with him at the scrapyard.

At the scrapyard, Dwayne gives Nick the code to deactivate and unbuckle the bomb with just minutes to spare. Dwayne has them at gunpoint but Nick has Chet fake having a sniper on them by pointing with his laser pointer. Believing him, Dwayne and Travis drop their weapons and Nick starts to leave with Kate.

However, Chango arrives and knocks Nick out, then holds Dwayne and Travis at gunpoint, demanding the money. Dwayne gives it to him, but Chango decides to still kill him so Travis torches him with a flamethrower. While burning on the ground, Chango wounds Dwayne and shoots the gas tank on Travis's back, causing it to explode.

Nick grabs the money and leaves with Kate and Chet. Dwayne chases after them and when he is about to shoot Nick, the bomb explodes, seemingly killing him. (Nick reveals he reactivated the bomb and put it in Dwayne's van). While Chet looks at the money, a blue dye pack explodes in his face.

In a post-credits scene, Dwayne (who survived the explosion), Travis, the Major recuperating in a wheelchair, and Juicy are seen in an advertisement for their new family business called "Major Tan: Tanning Salon", which is implied to be a cover for a prostitution ring.

=== Alternative ending ===
In the alternative ending, Nick, Chet and Kate drive off with the money, discussing what they will do with their newly gained riches. Meanwhile, Dwayne survives the explosion. Annoyed with his plan's failure, he goes to see if Chango successfully killed his father. Dwayne finds his dad on the floor suffering from his gunshot wound and tells him about the tanning salon/brothel idea. His father is excited and tells his son that he is proud of him.

The final scene is at the Four Seasons in Atlanta, where Kate is managing the special events program. She joins Nick and Chet, who are chilling out by the pool enjoying their new lives. The deceased Chango has been blamed for the bank robbery.

== Cast ==
- Jesse Eisenberg as Nick Davis, a pizza delivery boy who was forced into a turn of events to rob a bank after being strapped with a bomb vest
- Danny McBride as Dwayne "King Dwayne" Mikowlski, a low level man-child and the mastermind of a bank robbery leading to his father's hit
- Aziz Ansari as Chet Flanning (Chetan Douglas Subramaniam), Nick's friend who is a school teacher
- Nick Swardson as Travis Cord, Dwayne's partner who is known to build bombs and other devices
- Dilshad Vadsaria as Kate Flanning, Chet's sister
- Michael Peña as Chango, a hit-man who is an associate of Juicy
- Bianca Kajlich as Juicy, a lap dancer that Dwayne befriends
- Fred Ward as Jerry "The Major" Mikowlski, Dwayne's jarhead dad who got rich after a lottery win
- Brett Gelman as Chris, Nick's overbearing boss at a pizza restaurant
- Rebecca Cox as Sandra, a bank employee
- Rick Irwin as Mark the Bank Manager
- Torey Adkins as Big Guy, a bank customer during the robbery

== Production ==
Filming took place in Grand Rapids, Michigan, from July to September 2010, and a bank robbery scene was filmed at the vacant Ludington State Bank building—most recently a Fifth Third Bank—on James St. in Ludington, Michigan. The film's screenplay was written by Matthew Sullivan and Michael Diliberti, and the film was produced by Ben Stiller, through his production company, Red Hour Films. The film was released on August 12, 2011.

== Promotion ==
A screening of the film took place at the 2011 San Diego Comic-Con with actors Aziz Ansari, Nick Swardson, Michael Peña and director Ruben Fleischer.

== Soundtrack ==
- The Hives – "Tick Tick Boom"
- Beastie Boys – "Sure Shot"
- Generationals – "I Promise"
- Glenn Frey – "The Heat Is On"
- Band of Horses – "Laredo"
- Kid Cudi – "Is There Any Love?"
- M.O.P. – "Ante Up"
- Third Eye Blind – "Jumper", referenced multiple times throughout the film.
- Ol' Dirty Bastard featuring Kelis – "Got Your Money"
- R. Kelly— “Ignition (Remix)”

== Release ==
30 Minutes or Less premiered at Grauman's Chinese Theatre on August 8, 2011. It was released via Sony Pictures on August 12 across 2,888 theatres.

=== Home media ===
30 Minutes or Less was released on Blu-ray and DVD on November 29, 2011, via Sony Pictures Home Entertainment. It was released on September 16, 2011, in the United Kingdom. The home media release featured an aspect ratio of 2.40:1 and included multiple extras, including a directors commentary from Fleischer, two featurettes detailing notes from the cast and crew, 10 deleted scenes, and outtakes.

== Reception ==
=== Box office ===
30 Minutes or Less grossed $13.3 million in its opening weekend across 2,888 theatres, the film was released alongside Final Destination 5 and Glee: The 3D Concert Movie below studio expectations. The film went on to earn a worldwide total of $40.5 million.

=== Critical response ===
On review aggregation website Rotten Tomatoes, the film has an approval rating of 45% based on 163 reviews, with an average rating of 5.42/10. The site's critical consensus reads, "It's sporadically funny and it benefits from a talented cast, but 30 Minutes or Less suffers from a disjointed narrative, and too often mistakes crude gags for true lowbrow humor." On Metacritic, which assigns a weighted average rating to reviews gives the film a score of 49 out of 100, based on 37 critics, indicating "mixed or average" reviews. Audiences polled by CinemaScore gave the film an average grade of "B" on an A+ to F scale.

Peter Bradshaw from The Guardian gave the film a positive review, writing that it was made with "flair and ingenuity" despite being "entirely ridiculous." Common Sense Media wrote a mixed review, criticizing the film for its violence, yet praising it for being "cheerful, willfully subversive, speedy, and lightweight". Kirk Honeycutt of The Hollywood Reporter gave the film a negative review, criticizing Michael Diliberti's screenplay for its "lethally stupid" characters and "extreme dullness".

== Similarity to death of Brian Wells ==
The plot of the film bears a resemblance to a real-life bank robbery gone wrong that resulted in the death of Brian Wells in 2003. As with the film, Wells was a pizza delivery man who was forced to wear a bomb and then robbed a bank under orders from the plot's mastermind in an effort to have the bomb defused. Additionally, an investigation found that the motive behind the robbery was for Marjorie Diehl-Armstrong, the convicted mastermind, to use the stolen money to hire a hitman to kill her father and receive her inheritance, also like the film. Unlike the film, however, Wells was killed by the bomb after being caught by the police.

Despite the similarities to the case, Sony Pictures Motion Picture Group said the filmmakers and cast had no prior knowledge of the incident, while the screenwriters were "vaguely familiar" with it. Nevertheless, the film drew criticism from Jean Heid, Wells' sister, and Jerry Clark, a former FBI agent who witnessed Wells' death and led the case's investigation.

== See also ==
- PVC-1
- Evil Genius
