= Len Compton =

Canadian politician

Mayor of Kenora, Ontario
- In office December 1, 2006 – November 30, 2010
- Preceded by: Dave Canfield
- Succeeded by: Dave Canfield

Personal details
- Born: Summerside, Prince Edward Island
- Occupation: Lawyer (retired)

Len Compton (born in Summerside, Prince Edward Island) is a Canadian politician who served as mayor of Kenora, Ontario from 2006 to 2010.

A lawyer who retired from practice in 2001, Compton served on Kenora's municipal council from 2003 to 2006. He defeated incumbent mayor Dave Canfield in the 2006 municipal election.

In early 2008, Compton rejected a buyout offer from Thunder Bay Telephone for Kenora's municipally owned telephone service provider, citing that an agreement in principle had already been reached to sell the system to Bell Aliant.

Compton announced in spring 2010 that he would not run for re-election in the 2010 municipal election. Canfield was re-elected as his successor.

As mayor, Compton was instrumental in the decision to have the Ontario Provincial Police provide policing to Kenora, which resulted in the disbandment of the town police force in 2009. One of the factors in the decision was the increased focus of the OPP on traffic enforcement. Ironically, in March 2011, Compton was arrested by the OPP while driving in Kenora and charged with exceeding the alcohol limit.
