= The Five-Star Weekend =

2023 novel by Elin Hilderbrand

- Language: English
- Genre: Fiction
- Publication date: 2023

The Five-Star Weekend is a 2023 novel written by Elin Hilderbrand.

== Synopsis ==
After her husband's tragic death, food blogger Hollis Shaw brings four friends from different times in her life to spend a weekend in Nantucket.

Tatum is her best friend from childhood and is battling a possible cancer diagnosis, a disease that took her mom's life when she was younger. Dru-Ann is her best friend and former roommate from college, now a sportscaster who is dealing with a public scandal after she accused a golf star of faking a mental health crisis. Brooke is her best friend from her "prime of life", as they raised their children together, and she is struggling with the dwindling romance in her marriage and not feeling like a good enough friend to Hollis. Finally, Gigi is a woman Hollis met online through her blog. Chronicling the entire weekend is Hollis's daughter Caroline who is interning with a famous documentary filmmaker.

During this trip, the women rediscover the meaning of friendship and overcome their personal struggles as secrets are revealed.

== Television adaptation ==
In January 2025, Peacock ordered a television series adaptation of the novel. The TV series features Jennifer Garner, who also serves as an executive producer. Bekah Brunstetter serves as a developer, writer and executive producer of the series. It was originally set to be released on July 16, 2026, with all eight episodes; however, the premiere date was moved to July 9, 2026.
