= Dave Canfield =

Canadian politician

Mayor of Kenora, Ontario
- In office December 1, 2010 – November 30, 2018
- Preceded by: Len Compton
- Succeeded by: Dan Reynard

Mayor of Kenora, Ontario
- In office December 1, 2000 – November 30, 2006
- Preceded by: Kelvin Winkler
- Succeeded by: Len Compton

David S. Canfield is a Canadian politician who served as the mayor of Kenora, Ontario from 2000 to 2006 and from 2010 to 2018. Formerly the mayor of Jaffray Melick, Canfield was elected mayor of the newly amalgamated city in 2000. Prior to being mayor, he was a loader operator at the local paper mill. In 2005, Canfield became the first public figure in Northwestern Ontario to publicly advocate the secession of the region from Ontario to join the province of Manitoba.

In the 2006 municipal election, Canfield was defeated in his re-election bid by Len Compton. He was re-elected in the 2010 municipal election, after Compton announced that he would not run for another term.

Canfield announced in September 2018 that he would not run for another mayoral term in the 2018 municipal election. He was succeeded by Dan Reynard.
