= Elin Hilderbrand =

American romance novelist (born 1969)

- Born: July 17, 1969 (age 57); Collegeville, Pennsylvania, U.S.
- Education: Johns Hopkins University
- Occupation: Author
- Writing career
- Language: English
- Genres: Romance; mystery

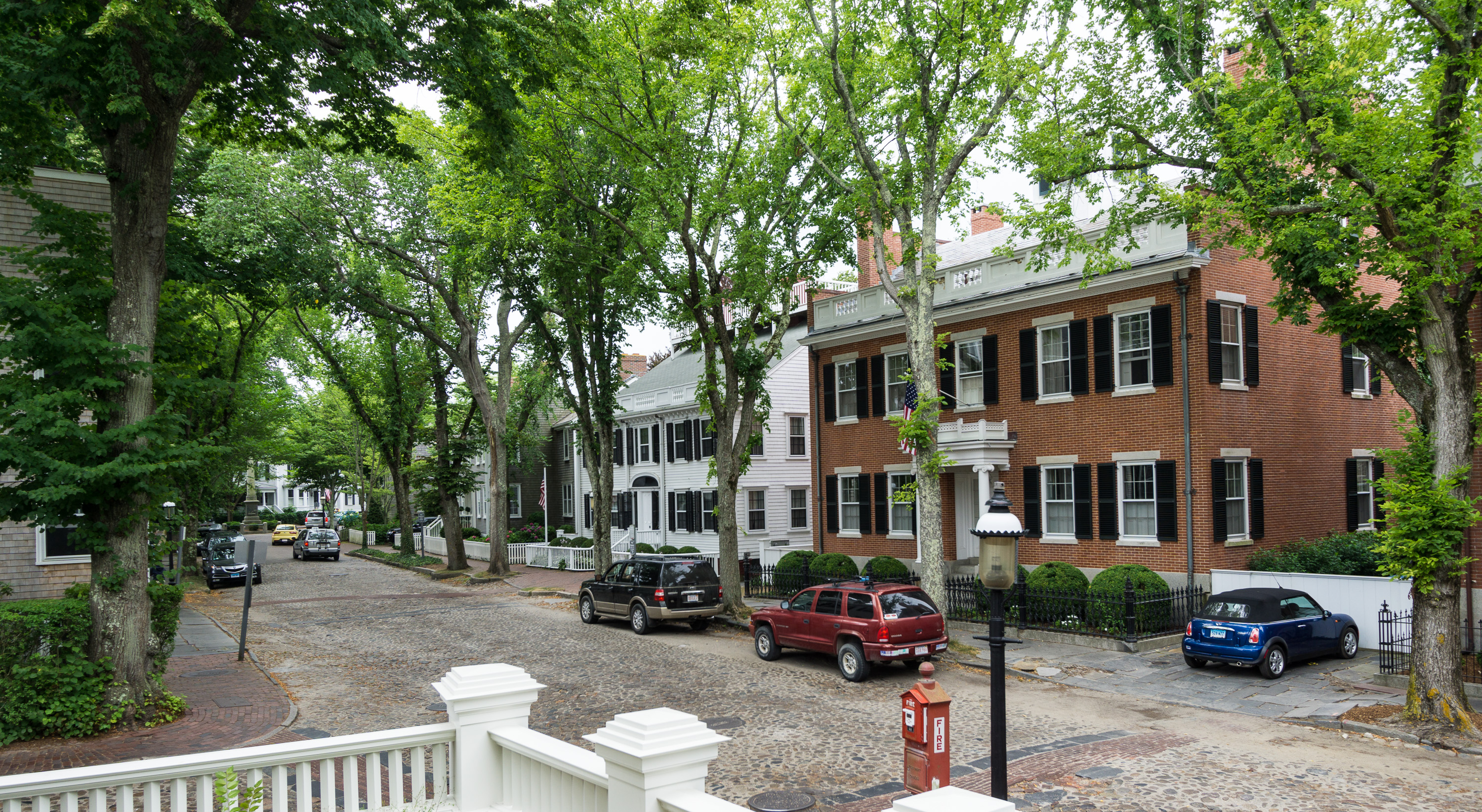
Main Street, Nantucket. Featured in many of Hilderbrand's books.

Elin Hilderbrand (born July 17, 1969) is an American writer of mystery and romance. Her novels are typically set on and around Nantucket, where she resides. In 2019, New York magazine called her "the queen of beach reads". She has sold over 20 million books.

== Early life and education ==
Born and raised in Collegeville, Pennsylvania, Hildebrand spent her summers on Cape Cod, until her father died in a plane crash when she was 16. She spent the next summer working in a factory that made Halloween costumes. While working at the factory, she decided to find a way to spend every summer at the beach.

She attended Johns Hopkins University, majoring in creative writing. After graduating, she became a teaching and writing fellow at the Iowa Writers' Workshop.

== Career ==
Hilderbrand moved to Nantucket in 1993, working on classified ads at a local newspaper. During her first trip to Nantucket, she met her now ex-husband, Chip Cunningham.

Her first novel The Beach Club was published in 2000. This novel was chosen as the People magazine Beach Read of the Week. Beginning in 2000, her novels were published by St. Martin's Press. Since Barefoot in 2007, they have been published by Little, Brown and Company.

The locations in Hilderbrand’s novels are realistic depictions of current-day Nantucket, featuring local businesses and landmarks like the Brant Point Light and The Chicken Box. Despite many of her books not being a part of an official series, characters and locations overlap.

Her 2018 book The Perfect Couple, which was her first murder mystery, was adapted by Netflix and released as a miniseries with the same name in 2024, starring Nicole Kidman, Liev Schreiber, Eve Hewson and Dakota Fanning.

Ellen Pompeo has been working with ABC to adapt Hilderbrand's Paradise Trilogy into a TV series, in which she would star after her departure as the lead in Grey's Anatomy.

After her 30th book was published, Swan Song, Hilderbrand made the decision to retire from Nantucket-based novels. She wrote a two-part book series with her daughter, Shelby Cunningham, based on the latter's experience at St George's School in Newport, Rhode Island. The first book of the series, The Academy, released on September 16th, 2025; its follow-up, The Thoroughbreds, released in September 2026.

Her book The Five-Star Weekend was adopted into a Peacock series, released in July 2026.

== Personal life ==
In 1995 Hilderbrand married Chip Cunningham at The Chanticleer in the Nantucket village of Siasconset. They have three children, and were divorced in 2015.

Hilderbrand was diagnosed with breast cancer in 2014, undergoing a double mastectomy. Since 2014, she has undergone many reconstructive surgeries. Hilderbrand has been vocal about her diagnosis and empowering other women through her movement, #mamastrong. This initiative sends her books to cancer centers around the United States.

== Bibliography ==
=== Novels ===
Book Title	Year Published	ISBN
The Beach Club	2000	ISBN 978-0-312-38242-1
Nantucket Nights	2002	ISBN 978-0-312-98976-7
Summer People	2003	ISBN 978-0-312-99719-9
The Blue Bistro	2005	ISBN 978-0-312-99262-0
The Love Season	2006	ISBN 0-312-36969-7
Barefoot	2007	ISBN 978-0-316-01859-3
A Summer Affair	2008	ISBN 978-0-316-01860-9
The Castaways	2009	ISBN 978-0-340-91980-4
The Island	2010	ISBN 978-0-316-04387-8
Silver Girl	2011	ISBN 978-0-316-09966-0
Summerland	2012	ISBN 978-0-316-09983-7
Beautiful Day	2013	ISBN 978-0-316-09976-9
The Matchmaker	2014	ISBN 978-0-316-09975-2
Winter Street	2014	ISBN 978-0-316-37611-2
The Rumor	2015	ISBN 978-0-316-33452-5
Winter Stroll	2015	ISBN 978-0-316-26113-5
Here's To Us	2016	ISBN 978-0-316-37514-6
Winter Storms	2016	ISBN 978-0-316-44948-9
The Identicals	2017	ISBN 978-1-473-61123-8
Winter Solstice	2017	ISBN 978-0-316-43545-1
The Perfect Couple	2018	ISBN 978-0-316-37526-9
Winter in Paradise	2018	ISBN 978-0-316-43551-2
Summer of '69	2019	ISBN 978-0-316-42001-3
What Happens in Paradise	2020	ISBN 978-0-316-43557-4
28 Summers	2020	ISBN 978-0-316-42004-4
Troubles in Paradise	2020	ISBN 978-0-316-43558-1
Golden Girl	2021	ISBN 978-0-316-42008-2
The Hotel Nantucket	2022	ISBN 978-0-316-25867-8
The Five-Star Weekend	2023	ISBN 978-0-316-25877-7
Swan Song	2024	ISBN 978-0-316-25887-6
The Academy	2025	ISBN 978-0-316-56785-5
The Thoroughbreds	2026	ISBN 978-0-316-56794-7

=== Short stories ===
Book Title	Year Published	ISBN
The Surfing Lesson: An Original Short Story	2013	ISBN 978-0-316-24286-8
The Tailgate: An Original Short Story	2014	ISBN 978-0-316-37616-7
Summer of '79: A Summer of '69 Story	2020	ISBN 978-0-316-54180-0
The Sixth Wedding: A 28 Summers Story	2021	ISBN 978-0-316-30917-2
Natural Selection	2024	ISBN 978-1662521478
