= Kenora =

City in Ontario, Canada

- City (single-tier)
- City of Kenora
- Nickname: K-Town
- Motto: North America's premier boating destination
- Location within Ontario
- Coordinates: 49°46′N 94°29′W
- Country: Canada
- Province: Ontario
- District: Kenora
- Incorporated (town): 1882 as Rat Portage
- Renamed: 1905 as Kenora
- Amalgamated (City): 2000

Government
  - Mayor: Andrew Poirier
  - Governing Body: Kenora City Council
  - MP: Eric Melillo (Kenora—Kiiwetinoong, CPC)
  - MPP: Greg Rickford (Kenora—Rainy River, PC)

Area
  - Land: 211.65 km^{2} (81.72 sq mi)
  - Urban: 15.25 km^{2} (5.89 sq mi)
- Elevation: 409.70 m (1,344.2 ft)

Population (2021)
  - Total: 14,865
  - Density: 70.7/km^{2} (183/sq mi)
  - Urban: 10,974
  - Urban density: 719.6/km^{2} (1,864/sq mi)
- Time zone: UTC−05:00 (CDT)
- Forward sortation area: P9N
- Area code: 807
- Website: www.kenora.ca

Kenora (/kəˈnɔːrə/), previously named Rat Portage (French: Portage-aux-Rats), is a city situated on the Lake of the Woods in Ontario, Canada, close to the Manitoba boundary, and about 208 km (129 mi) east of Winnipeg by the Trans-Canada Highway. It is the seat of Kenora District.

The history of the name extends beyond the time of French settlers arriving in the region. The name Rat Portage had its origin in the Ojibwe name Wazhashk-Onigam, which, roughly translated, means portage to the country of the muskrats. A shortened and somewhat corrupted version, Rat Portage, was adopted by the Hudson's Bay Company in naming their post, then located on Old Fort Island on the Winnipeg River. When the post was moved to the mainland and a town grew up around it, the name Rat Portage was assumed by the community.

The town of Rat Portage was renamed in 1905 by using the first two letters of itself and the neighbouring towns of Keewatin and Norman to form the present-day City of Kenora. In 2001, the towns of Kenora (including Norman) and Keewatin as well as the Township of Jaffray Melick amalgamated under the Municipal Act.

Kenora is the administrative headquarters of the Anishinabe of Wauzhushk Onigum, Obashkaandagaang Bay, and Washagamis Bay First Nations band governments.

== Toponymy ==
The name "Kenora" was coined by combining the first two letters of Keewatin, Norman and Rat Portage.

The traditional Ojibwe name of Kenora is Wazhashk-Onigamiing, meaning place of the muskrat portage, corresponding to the older English name of the settlement, Rat Portage. The nearby First Nation band of the Anishinabe of Wauzhushk Onigum retains this name as well.

== History ==
Kenora is situated on the traditional territory of the Ojibway people. The first European, Jacques de Noyon, sighted Lake of the Woods in 1688. Among the earliest Europeans in the Lake of the Woods area was explorer and fur trader Pierre Gaultier de Varennes et de La Vérendrye.

Pierre de La Vérendrye established a secure French trading post, Fort Saint Charles, to the south of present-day Kenora near the current Canada/U.S. border in 1732, and France maintained the post until 1763 when it lost the territory to the British in the Seven Years' War. Until then, it was the most northwesterly settlement of New France. In 1836 the Hudson's Bay Company established a post on Old Fort Island, and in 1861, the Company opened a post on the mainland at Kenora's current location.

In 1878, the company surveyed lots for the permanent settlement of Rat Portage ("portage to the country of the muskrat") — the community kept that name until 1905, when it was renamed Kenora.

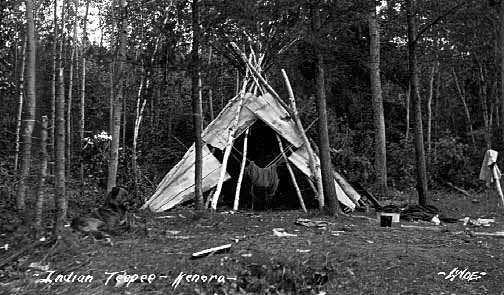
Ojibway tipi, Kenora, 1922.

Kenora was once claimed as part of the Province of Manitoba, and there are early references to Rat Portage, Manitoba. There was a long-lasting argument between the two provinces known as the Ontario-Manitoba boundary dispute. Each province claimed the town as part of their territory and the dispute lasted from 1870 to 1884. Although Ottawa had ruled the town part of Manitoba in 1881, the issue was finally taken up with the Judicial Committee of the Privy Council which eventually decided in Ontario's favour. Kenora officially became part of the province of Ontario in 1889. Boundaries were drawn up for the provinces and the Northwest Angle on Lake of the Woods which definitively drew the borders between Ontario, Manitoba, and the U.S. state of Minnesota.

Gold and the railway were both important in the community's early history: gold was first discovered in the area in 1850, and by 1893, 20 mines were operating within 24 km (15 mi) of Rat Portage, and the first Canadian ocean-to-ocean train passed through in 1886 on the Canadian Pacific Railway. Among the entrepreneurs attracted to the town was the Hon. JEP Vereker, a retired British army officer and youngest son of the 4th Viscount Gort.

Later, a highway was built through Kenora in 1932, becoming part of Canada's first coast-to-coast highway in 1943, and then part of the Trans-Canada Highway, placing the community on both of Canada's major transcontinental transportation routes. The original barrier to the completion of the highway concerned the crossing of the Winnipeg River at two locations. The single-span arch bridges are among the longest of their type in North America.

During the Prohibition era in the United States, the Lake of the Woods served as a smuggler's route for the transport of alcohol.

In December 1883, there was a large fire in Rat Portage, rendering 70 of the town's then population of 700 homeless.

The Stanley Cup was won by the Kenora Thistles hockey team in 1907. The team featured such Hall of Famers as Billy McGimsie, Tommy Phillips, and Art Ross, for whom the Art Ross Trophy is named. Kenora is the smallest town to have won a major North American sports title.

Rat Portage is mentioned in Algernon Blackwood's famous 1910 story, "The Wendigo".

On November 22, 1965, around 400 Aboriginal protesters, inspired by the Selma to Montgomery marches against white supremacy and racial discrimination in the Southern United States, undertook a quarter-mile march against anti-indigenous racism along Main Street to Legion Hall, where they expressed their grievances to the city's mayor and councilors. This march became widely referred to as Canada's first civil rights march. In the summer of 1974, dozens of First Nations youth, led by Louis Cameron and the Ojibway Warriors Society and aided by members of the American Indian Movement, launched a weeks-long armed occupation of Anishinaabe Park in the city's Lakeside neighbourbood, an event that has been cited as the first "Land Back" action to take place in Canada.

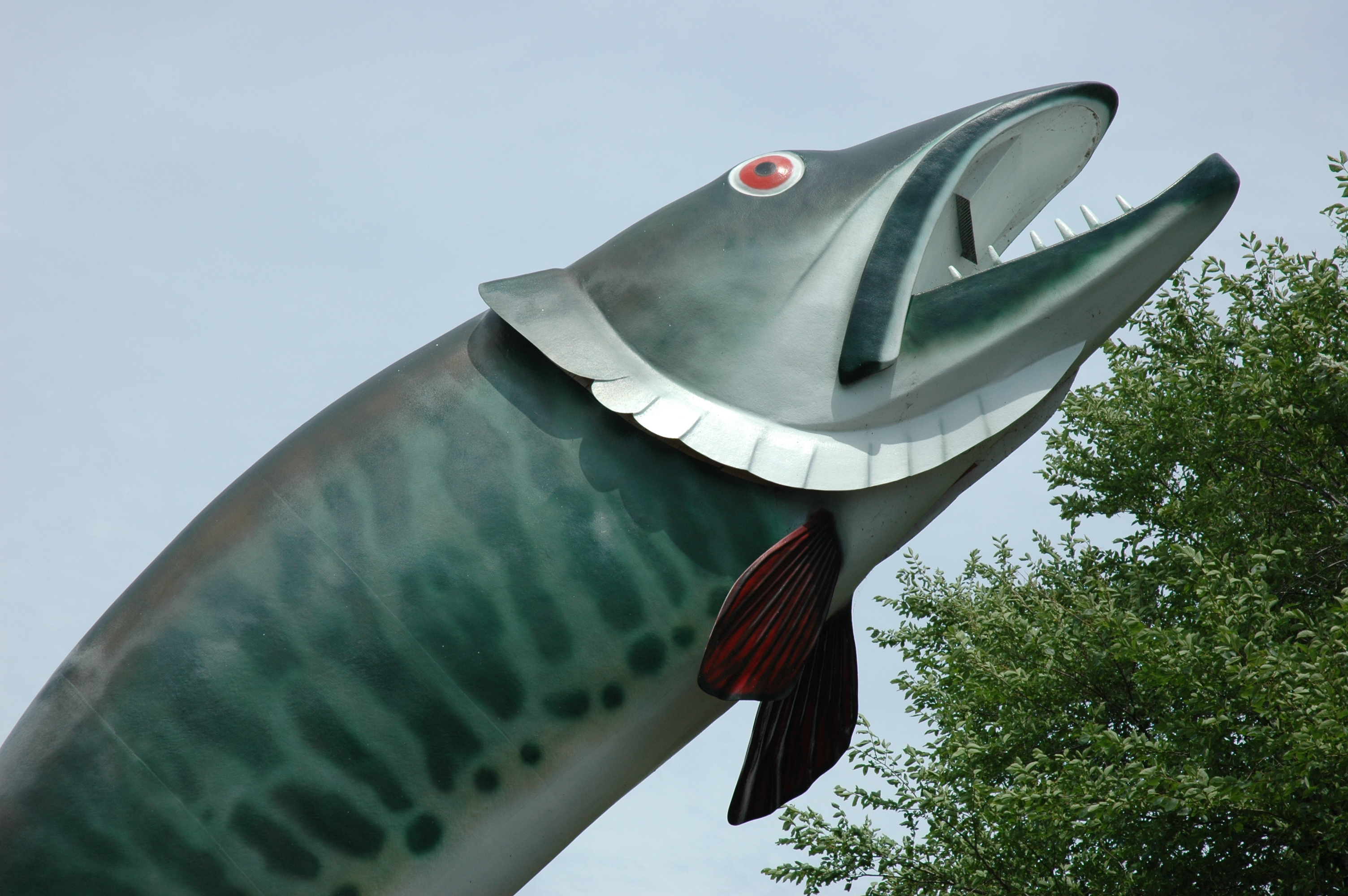
Husky the Muskie

In 1967, the year of the Canadian Centennial, Kenora erected a sculpture known as Husky the Muskie. It has become the town's mascot and one of its most recognizable features.

A dramatic bank robbery took place in Kenora on May 10, 1973. An unknown man entered the Canadian Imperial Bank of Commerce heavily armed and wearing a "dead man's switch", a device utilising a clothespin, wires, battery and dynamite, where the user holds the clothespin in the mouth, exerting force on the clothespin. Should the user release the clothespin, two wires attached to both sides of the pin complete an electrical circuit, sending current from the battery, detonating the explosives. After robbing the bank, the robber exited the CIBC, and was preparing to enter a city vehicle driven by undercover police officer Don Milliard. A sniper, Robert Letain, positioned across the street, shot the robber, causing the explosives to detonate and kill the robber. Most of the windows on the shops on the main street were shattered as a result of the blast. Later, Kenora Police submitted DNA samples from the robber's remains to a national database to identify him; however, the suspect was never positively identified.

The importance of the logging industry declined in the second part of the 20th century, and the last log boom was towed into Kenora in 1985. The tourist and recreation industries have become more important.

== Geography ==
=== Neighbourhoods ===
In addition to the former towns of Keewatin and Jaffray Melick, the city includes the neighbourhoods of Norman, Rabbit Lake, Rideout, Pinecrest, Minto, and Lakeside.

Keewatin forms the westernmost section of the City of Kenora. Norman was a small community halfway between the village of Keewatin and Rat Portage. The Village of Keewatin was founded in 1877 while the Village of Norman was founded in 1892; both communities amalgamated with Rat Portage in 1905 to form the Township of Kenora. Keewatin eventually separated and was founded as a Township in 1908.

The Jaffray Melick neighbourhood is the north-easternmost section of the City of Kenora. The Township of Jaffray was founded in 1894 and the Township of Melick in 1902; the two townships were amalgamated in 1908 as Jaffray and Melick, and renamed Jaffray Melick in 1911. Compared to Keewatin, Norman, and Rat Portage, Jaffray Melick is the most rural community, with few retail stores and one golf course, Beauty Bay, on Black Sturgeon Lake.

=== Climate ===
Kenora has a humid continental climate (Köppen climate classification Dfb) with warm summers and cold, dry winters. Its climate is influenced by continental air masses. Winters are cold with a January high of −11 °C (12 °F) and a low of −21 °C (−6 °F). Temperatures below −20 °C (−4 °F) occur on 45 days. The average annual snowfall is 158 cm (62 in), which is lower than places to the east as it is influenced by the dry air of continental high-pressure zones, resulting in relatively dry winters. Summers are warm with a July high of 24 °C (75 °F) and a low of 15 °C (59 °F) and temperatures above 30 °C (86 °F) occur on 5.3 days. The average annual precipitation is 662 mm (26 in), with most of it being concentrated in the summer months with June being the wettest month and February the driest.

During the winter Kenora will get precipitation mostly in the form of snow, other forms of winter precipitation include ice, sleet, and freezing rain. Snow cover usually lasts from November to March, about 154 days or 42% of the year. The city frequently gets late spring and summer thunderstorms, only on occasion severe, averaging 24 days a year with thunderstorm activity.

The highest temperature ever recorded in Kenora was 40.6 °C (105.1 °F) on 11 July 1936. The coldest temperature ever recorded was −43.9 °C (−47.0 °F) on 20 January 1943.

Climate data for Kenora Airport, 1991−2020 normals, extremes 1899−present (Note: Temperature data was recorded in the city of Kenora from October 1899 to March 1939, and at Kenora Airport from August 1938 to present.)
Month	Jan	Feb	Mar	Apr	May	Jun	Jul	Aug	Sep	Oct	Nov	Dec	Year
Record high humidex	9.0	10.7	27.1	30.0	39.3	41.2	43.2	41.6	41.6	28.9	19.7	8.7	43.2
Record high °C (°F)	9.1 (48.4)	8.8 (47.8)	23.8 (74.8)	30.6 (87.1)	35.4 (95.7)	37.2 (99.0)	40.6 (105.1)	35.0 (95.0)	34.6 (94.3)	26.7 (80.1)	19.4 (66.9)	9.4 (48.9)	40.6 (105.1)
Mean daily maximum °C (°F)	−11.4 (11.5)	−7.8 (18.0)	−0.1 (31.8)	8.6 (47.5)	16.3 (61.3)	21.9 (71.4)	24.4 (75.9)	23.4 (74.1)	17.4 (63.3)	8.8 (47.8)	−0.6 (30.9)	−8.2 (17.2)	7.7 (45.9)
Daily mean °C (°F)	−15.8 (3.6)	−12.7 (9.1)	−5.2 (22.6)	3.5 (38.3)	11.0 (51.8)	17.0 (62.6)	19.6 (67.3)	18.7 (65.7)	13.1 (55.6)	5.2 (41.4)	−3.8 (25.2)	−12 (10)	3.2 (37.8)
Mean daily minimum °C (°F)	−20.1 (−4.2)	−17.6 (0.3)	−10.3 (13.5)	−1.7 (28.9)	5.7 (42.3)	12.0 (53.6)	14.9 (58.8)	13.9 (57.0)	8.6 (47.5)	1.7 (35.1)	−6.9 (19.6)	−16 (3)	−1.3 (29.7)
Record low °C (°F)	−43.9 (−47.0)	−43.3 (−45.9)	−36.1 (−33.0)	−27.2 (−17.0)	−12.2 (10.0)	−1.1 (30.0)	3.9 (39.0)	−1.7 (28.9)	−6.7 (19.9)	−20 (−4)	−31.3 (−24.3)	−41.1 (−42.0)	−43.9 (−47.0)
Record low wind chill	−57.5	−54.3	−46.7	−37.7	−20.5	−4.2	0.0	0.0	−12.6	−22.2	−46.8	−51.5	−57.5
Average precipitation mm (inches)	26.6 (1.05)	21.4 (0.84)	26.5 (1.04)	39.9 (1.57)	91.1 (3.59)	119.3 (4.70)	110.0 (4.33)	91.4 (3.60)	93.9 (3.70)	67.3 (2.65)	38.2 (1.50)	28.3 (1.11)	753.9 (29.68)
Average rainfall mm (inches)	0.8 (0.03)	2.8 (0.11)	7.9 (0.31)	23.9 (0.94)	86.7 (3.41)	119.2 (4.69)	110.0 (4.33)	93.3 (3.67)	93.5 (3.68)	53.2 (2.09)	12.3 (0.48)	1.2 (0.05)	604.8 (23.81)
Average snowfall cm (inches)	31.2 (12.3)	22.5 (8.9)	21.0 (8.3)	16.7 (6.6)	4.6 (1.8)	0.1 (0.0)	0.0 (0.0)	0.0 (0.0)	0.5 (0.2)	15.4 (6.1)	31.0 (12.2)	32.4 (12.8)	175.3 (69.0)
Average precipitation days (≥ 0.2 mm)	13.6	11.0	10.6	9.6	13.5	14.5	13.5	12.2	14.2	14.0	13.9	15.5	156.2
Average rainy days (≥ 0.2 mm)	0.60	1.0	3.0	6.0	12.7	14.5	13.5	12.5	14.0	10.3	3.3	0.92	92.3
Average snowy days (≥ 0.2 cm)	14.2	11.0	9.0	5.3	1.6	0.13	0.0	0.0	0.50	6.0	13.2	15.7	76.5
Average relative humidity (%) (at 15:00)	71.6	62.0	54.9	45.4	48.7	53.6	54.4	55.0	60.4	66.0	73.7	77.2	60.2
Source: Environment Canada Extremes for Kenora 1899-1939

== Demographics ==
In the 2021 Census of Population conducted by Statistics Canada, Kenora had a population of 14,967 living in 6,510 of its 7,637 total private dwellings, a change of −0.9% from its 2016 population of 15,096. With a land area of 211.65 km^{2} (81.72 sq mi), it had a population density of 70.7/km^{2} (183.2/sq mi) in 2021.

Historical population

Year	Pop.	±%
1891	1,806	—
1901	5,202	+188.0%
1911	6,158	+18.4%
1921	5,407	−12.2%
1931	6,766	+25.1%
1941	7,672	+13.4%

Year	Pop.	±%
1951	8,695	+13.3%
1961	10,904	+25.4%
1971	10,952	+0.4%
1981	9,817	−10.4%
1991	9,782	−0.4%
1996	10,063	+2.9%

Year	Pop.	±%
2001	15,838	+57.4%
2006	15,177	−4.2%
2011	15,348	+1.1%
2016	15,096	−1.6%
2021	14,967	−0.9%

The population change between 1996 and 2001 reflects Kenora's amalgamation in 2000.

The median household income in 2005 for Kenora was $59,946, which is slightly below the Ontario provincial average of $60,455.

Ethnic groups
Canada 2016 Census		Population	% of Total Population
Visible minority group	Filipino	140	0.9
Visible minority group	South Asian	45	0.3
Visible minority group	Black	45	0.3
Visible minority group	Chinese	40	0.3
Visible minority group	Latin American	20	0.1
Visible minority group	Japanese	20	0.1
Visible minority group	Other or mixed visible minority	50	0.3
Total visible minority population		355	2.4
Aboriginal group Source:	First Nations	1,610	10.9
Aboriginal group Source:	Métis	1,495	10.1
Aboriginal group Source:	Inuit	10	0.1
Total Aboriginal population		3,150	21.3
European		11,285	76.3
Total population		14,790	100

== Economy ==
Forestry, tourism and mining are the three largest sectors of the Kenora economy. The population balloons in the spring and summer to almost double the normal population when summer residents move in. The Lake of the Woods and numerous smaller lakes situated all around Kenora are the major draw for cottagers who summer here. Many are from the neighbouring province of Manitoba and the state of Minnesota.

=== Tourism ===
Kenora, a site of natural attractions, has visitors from all over the world year round. In the summer months visitors come to the area to undertake activities including swimming, biking, fishing, hiking, and boating. Kenora's tourist industry is also active during the winter months as visitors come not only to observe its natural environment but also to partake in ice fishing, snowboarding, skiing (both downhill and cross country) and snowmachining.

Kenora has two travel information centres. One is the newly renovated (2011) pavilion, located on the Harbourfront. The second information centre, called the Discovery Centre, opened July 22, 2011, and serves visitors year-round from its location at 931 Lake View Drive (just off of Highway 17 West, also known as the Trans Canada highway).

== Arts and culture ==
The Lake of the Woods Museum and Douglas Family Art Centre are located at The MUSE.

Harbourfront, a park on the shore of Lake of the Woods, hosts the city's annual winter and summer festivals, as well as concerts.

Husky the Muskie, a 40 feet (12 m) statue of a fighting muskellunge, is located in McLeod Park.

The city's downtown core has a public arts project, with 20 murals depicting the region's history painted on buildings in the business district.

The city is home to a major international freshwater bass fishing tournament.

Kenora is sometimes stereotyped as an archetypal "hoser" community, evidenced by the phrase "Kenora dinner jacket" as a nickname for a hoser's flannel shirt.

St. Alban's Anglican Cathedral is in Kenora.

The now-defunct Kenora Thistles ice hockey won the Stanley Cup in 1907, making Kenora the smallest city to have ever won the trophy. Many local contemporary ice hockey clubs pay homage to the team by using its name, including the town's amateur, junior, and senior-level men's team.

== Government ==
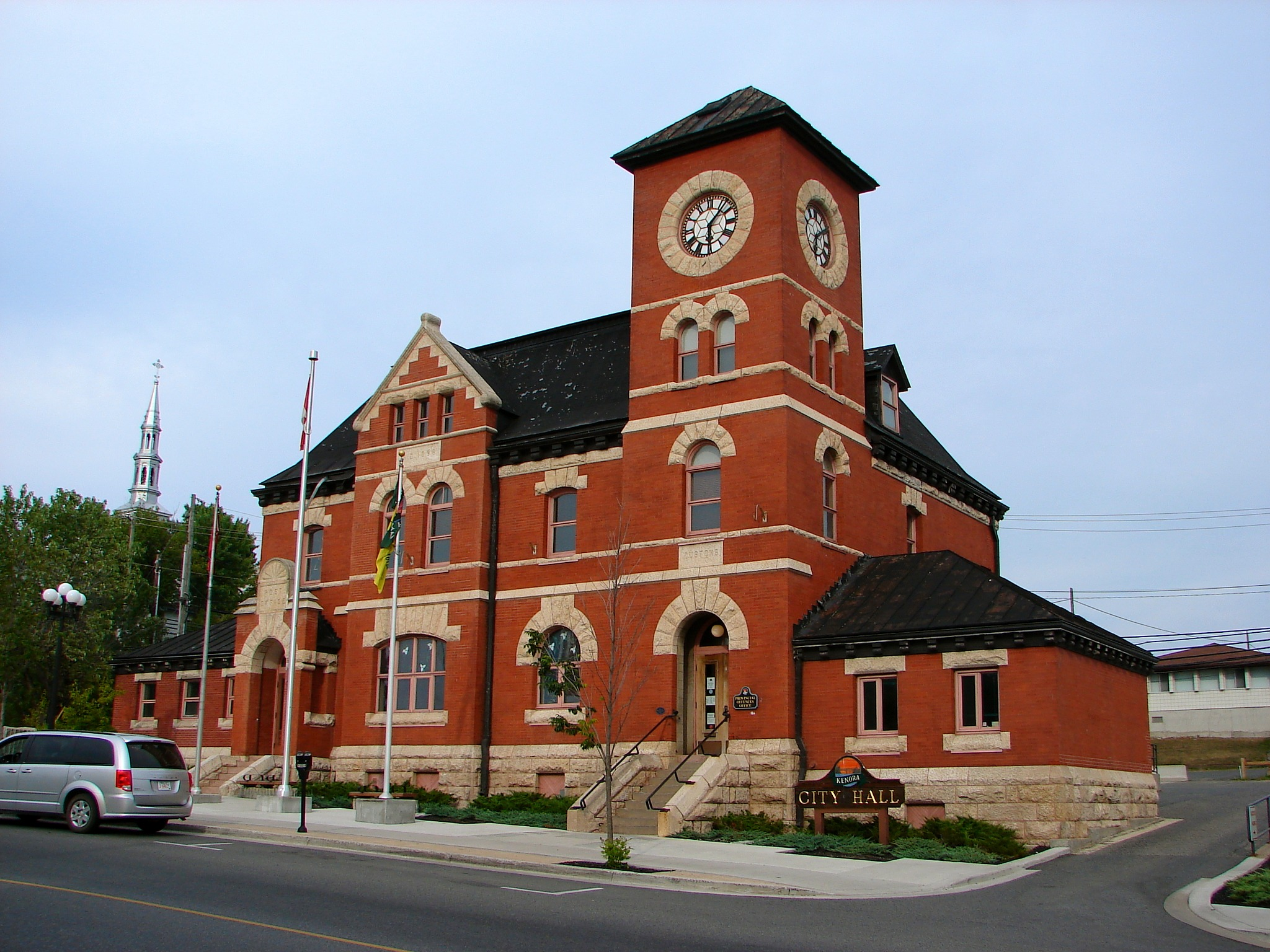
Kenora City Hall

The City of Kenora is governed by a city council that consists of six councillors and a mayor. The full council is responsible for setting municipal by-laws and policies and overseeing planning in the city. Under the Ontario Municipal Act, the full council is elected to a four year term.

Dave Canfield served as mayor from 2000 until 2006, when he was defeated by Len Compton in that year's municipal election. Compton declined to run in the 2010 municipal election and Canfield was re-elected as his successor, serving two additional terms before retiring from municipal politics prior to the 2018 municipal election. His successor, Dan Reynard served one term before stepping aside before the 2022 election when current mayor Andrew Poirier was first elected. Porier was acclaimed in the 2026 municipal election, while Reynard returned to council and was named Deputy Mayor.

Kenora is represented in the House of Commons by Conservative MP Eric Melillo, and in the Legislative Assembly of Ontario by MPP Greg Rickford of the Progressive Conservative Party of Ontario.

Some residents of Kenora, citing dissatisfaction with the level of government service provided to the region by the provincial government, have proposed that the region secede from Ontario to join the province of Manitoba.

== Infrastructure ==
=== Transportation ===
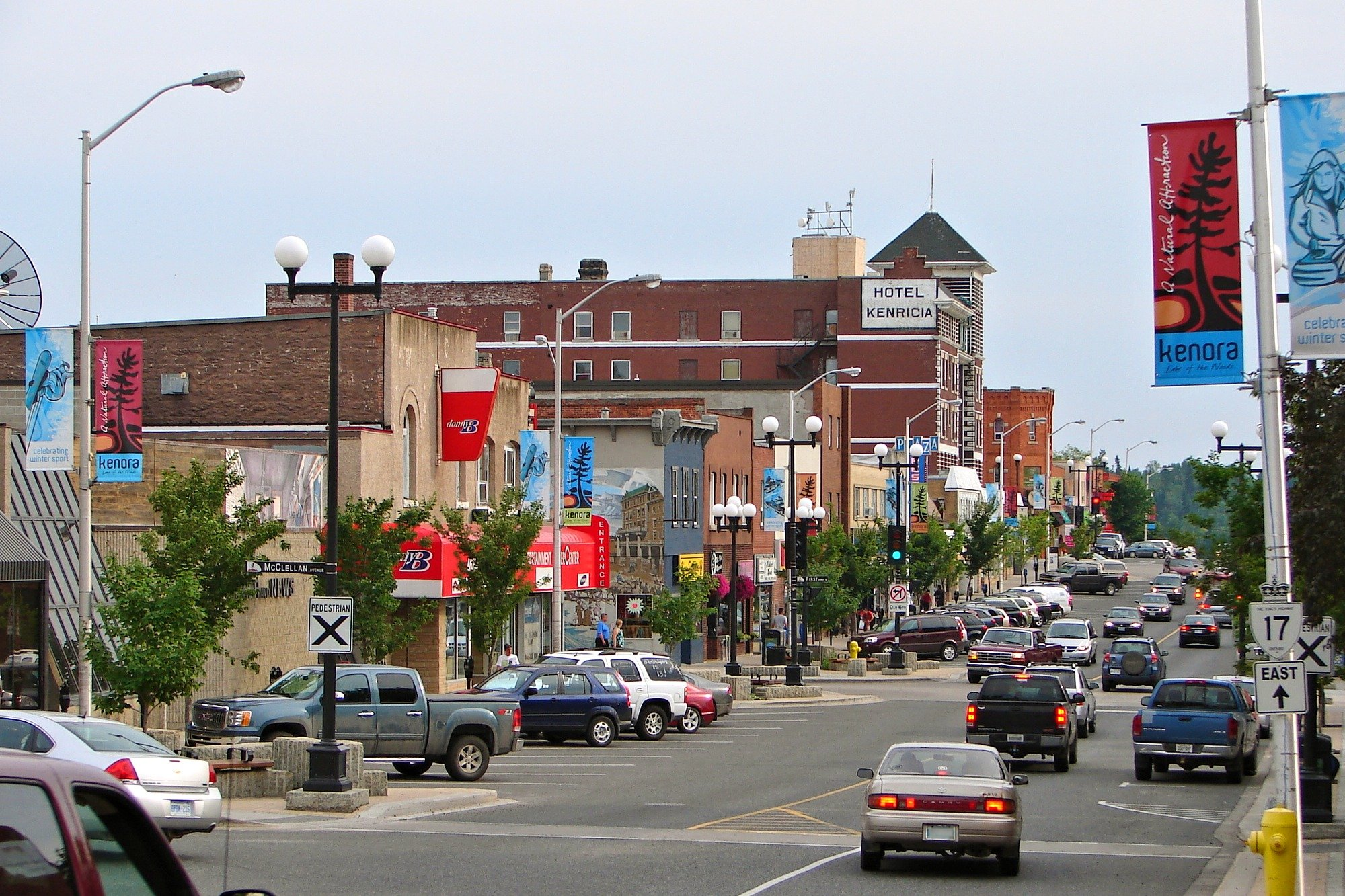
Main Street/Highway 17 in Kenora

Via Rail offers passenger service to Redditt on the CN transcontinental rail line, approximately 30 minutes and 20 km (12 mi) north of Kenora. The CP transcontinental rail line passes directly through town.

Kenora Airport is located 5 nautical miles (9.3 km; 5.8 mi) east northeast of the city centre.

M.S. Kenora is a cruise located at the waterfront.

Highway 17 passes through Kenora's urban core, and the Highway 17A Kenora By-Pass goes around the city. Both routes are designated as part of the Trans-Canada Highway. Highway 658 extends northerly from Kenora to Redditt.

=== Health care ===
Kenora's hospital, Lake of the Woods District Hospital, has three facilities in the city: the hospital itself, Morningstar Rehabilitation Centre, and Mental Health and Addictions services, located in St. Joseph's Health Centre.

=== Housing ===
Since Kenora is one of two judicial districts in Northwestern Ontario, it has disproportionate housing shortage as people from across the region with little to no social support in Kenora are unable to find places to stay after release from prison or while waiting in the city before their court dates. The situation worsened in 2013, when the judge in the Rainy River District moved and the position and its responsibilities was transferred to Kenora.

=== Military ===
The federal government maintains an armoury (Kenora Armoury at 800-11th Avenue North) in Kenora for the 116th Independent Field Battery, RCA.

== Education ==
Two school boards and 2 community colleges function in the Kenora area.

The Keewatin-Patricia District School Board operates one high school (Beaver Brae Secondary School) and four elementary schools (Keewatin Public School, Evergreen School, King George IV School, and Valleyview School).

The Kenora Catholic District School Board operates one high school (Saint Thomas Aquinas High School) and three elementary schools (École Ste. Marguerite-Bourgeois, Pope John Paul II School and St. Louis School). The elementary school, officially named Pope John Paul II, amalgamated approximately 350 students from the former Mount Carmel and Our Lady of the Valley schools. École Ste. Marguerite-Bourgeois is a French immersion school.

Confederation College has a Kenora campus and serves post-secondary and adult education needs in the city and surrounding area. Seven Generations Post Secondary Institute also offer post secondary courses, focusing on Indigenous teachings.

Housed within the college is Contact North, which offers Kenora residents local access to university and college programs not directly offered by the college campus. Contact North is Ontario's most extensive distance education network providing access to education and training opportunities in remote locations of Northern Ontario through a network of access centres. Contact North works with 13 colleges and universities.

There is also an Indigenous college and education facility called Seven Generations, located in the building that once housed Lakewood Junior High School before becoming Seven Generations Education Institute. It prepares Indigenous and non-Indigenous students for work within the community and surrounding region.

== Geological significance ==
One of Earth's earliest supercontinents, a large landmass comprising several of today's continents, predating Pangaea by 2.4 billion years, has been termed Kenorland by geologists, named after the Kenoran orogeny (also called the Algoman orogeny), which in turn was named after the town of Kenora, Ontario. In Kenora, rocks and geomagnetic evidence have been found which support Kenorland's creation approximately 2.72 billion years ago (2.72 Ga) as a result of a series of accretion events and the formation of new continental crust, demarcating the earliest identifiably known land on Earth.

== Media ==
The major news source in Kenora is the Kenora Miner and News.

=== Radio ===
- FM 89.5 - CJRL-FM ("89.5 The Lake"), adult contemporary
- FM 93.5 - CKSB-7-FM, Ici Radio-Canada Première (relays CKSB-10-FM, Winnipeg)
- FM 98.7 - CBQX-FM, CBC Radio One (relays CBQT-FM, Thunder Bay)
- FM 101.3 - CKWO-FM, ("101.3 The Gap"), Wauzhushk Onigum Nation (also serves the Kenora area), First Nations community radio
- FM 104.5 - CKQV-FM-2 ("Q104"), classic hits (relays CKQV-FM, Vermilion Bay)

=== Television ===
Kenora was Canada's smallest (and North America's second smallest) television market, served by only one television station, CJBN-TV channel 13, a Global affiliate that ceased broadcasting in January 2017. The Kenora region is not designated as a mandatory market for digital television conversion. The Winnipeg outlets of CBC Television (CBWT-DT), Radio-Canada (CBWFT-DT), CTV (CKY-DT), Global (CKND-DT) and Citytv (CHMI-DT) are piped in via cable.

== Notable people ==
- Gary Bergman, former NHL and Team Canada 1972 player
- Glory Annen Clibbery, actress
- Ralph Connor, writer
- Tim Coulis, former NHL player
- Abigail Dent, silver medalist in women's rowing at the 2024 Olympic Games
- Phil Eyler, politician
- Silas Griffis, member of the Hockey Hall of Fame
- Peter Heenan, municipal/provincial/federal politician
- Robert Hilles, poet
- Tom Hooper, member of the Hockey Hall of Fame
- Wab Kinew, 25th premier of Manitoba since October 18, 2023
- Kyle Koch, former CFL offensive guard (Toronto Argonauts)
- Victor Lindquist, Olympic hockey gold medal winner (1932)
- Shane Lunny, designer and producer, business founder
- Eric Melillo, MP
- Bob Nault, former MP and Indian Affairs Minister
- Dennis Olson, ice hockey player
- Tom Phillips, member of the Hockey Hall of Fame
- Mike Richards, ice hockey player
- Greg Rickford, MPP and Ontario Minister of Energy, Northern Development and Mines
- Rick St. Croix, former NHL goaltender and assistant coach for the Toronto Maple Leafs
- John Edward Schwitzer, former town engineer, later Canadian Pacific Railway assistant chief engineer, known for Big Hill project
- Jacques Schyrgens, painter
- Mike Smith, silver medalist in the decathlon at the 1991 World Championships
- J. Leonard Walker, president of the Bank of Montreal (1968-1973)

== Bibliography ==
- Halla, J. (2005). "Neoarchean sanukitoids (2.74–2.70 Ga)" (PDF). In Halla, J.; Nironen, M.; Lauri, L. S.; Kurhila, M. I.; Käpyaho, A.; Sorjonen-Ward, P.; Äikäs, O. (eds.). Eurogranites 2005: Proterozoic and Archean Granites and Related Rocks of the Finnish Precambrian. University of Helsinki.
