= Bob Gans =

American businessman (1887–1959)

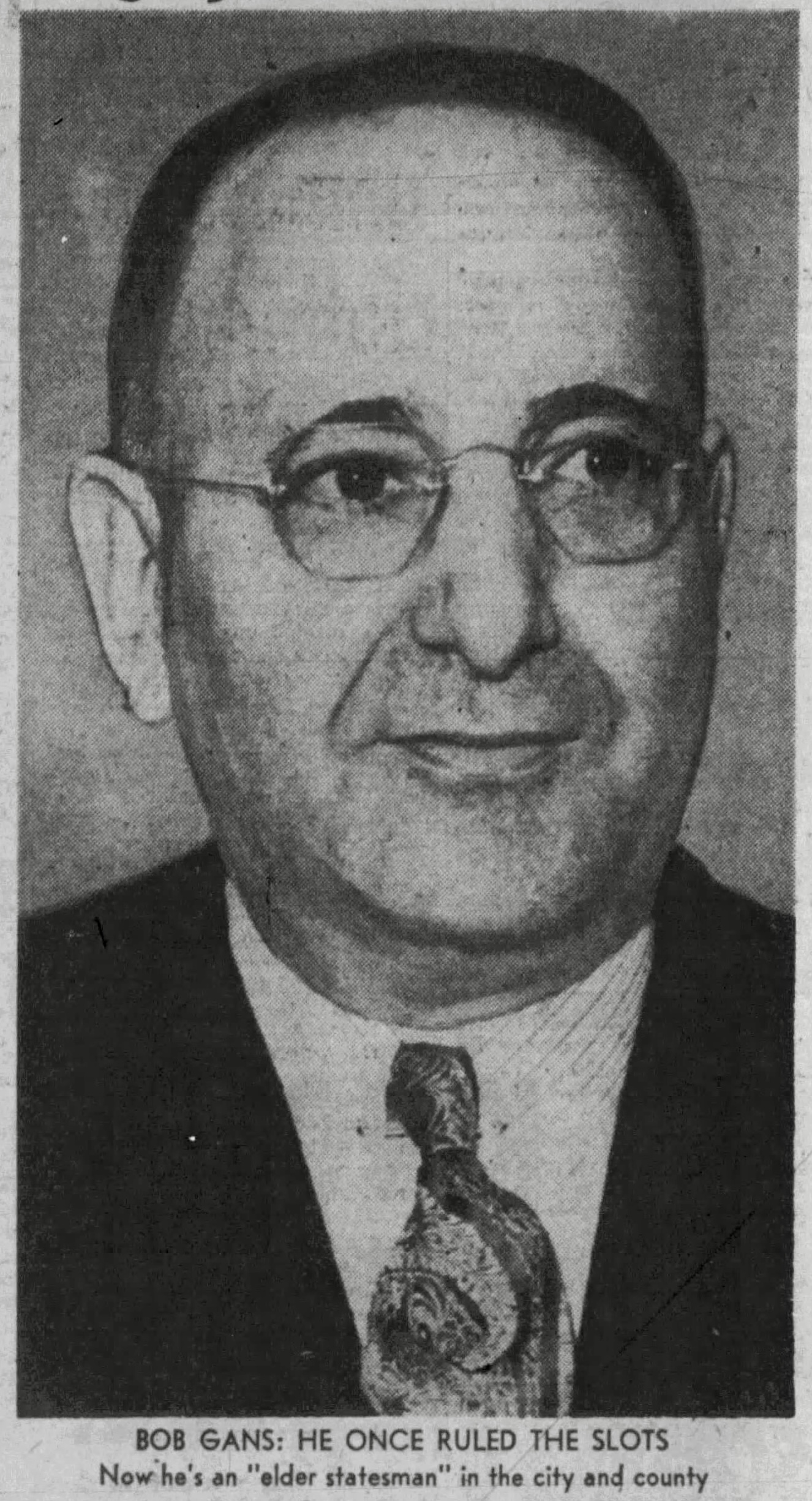
- "Slot machines highly remunerative" Illustrated Daily News, March 24, 1952
- Born: Robert Joseph Gans; October 27, 1887; New York City, U.S.
- Died: September 17, 1959 (aged 71); Los Angeles, California, U.S.

Robert Joseph "Bob" Gans (October 27, 1887 – September 17, 1959) was the "slot-machine king" of the Los Angeles underworld during the interwar period, and later a philanthropist and civic leader. For many years, he ran the board of Mt. Sinai Hospital, now Cedars-Sinai Medical Center. Gans was one of the most circumspect figures in the history of organized crime in southern California, but he was associated with both Charlie Crawford's City Hall Gang of the 1920s and Guy McAfee's Combination in the 1930s.

The slot-machine kingdom was a family business built by Bob Gans with his older brothers Joe Gans and Charlie Gans, Bob's son Cliff Gans, and his nephew-in-law Abe Chapman. The finances of the business are poorly understood but the amalgamated best guesstimates of the U.S. Internal Revenue Service and the handful of local crime-beat newspaper reporters who were not personally graft-adjacent seems to suggest that the Gans operation may have had gross revenues over 20 years of approximately US$200,000,000 (equivalent to $4,596,199,525 in 2025) and top-line profits for the proprietors over the same period of, at minimum, US$15,000,000 (equivalent to $344,714,964 in 2025).

== Background ==
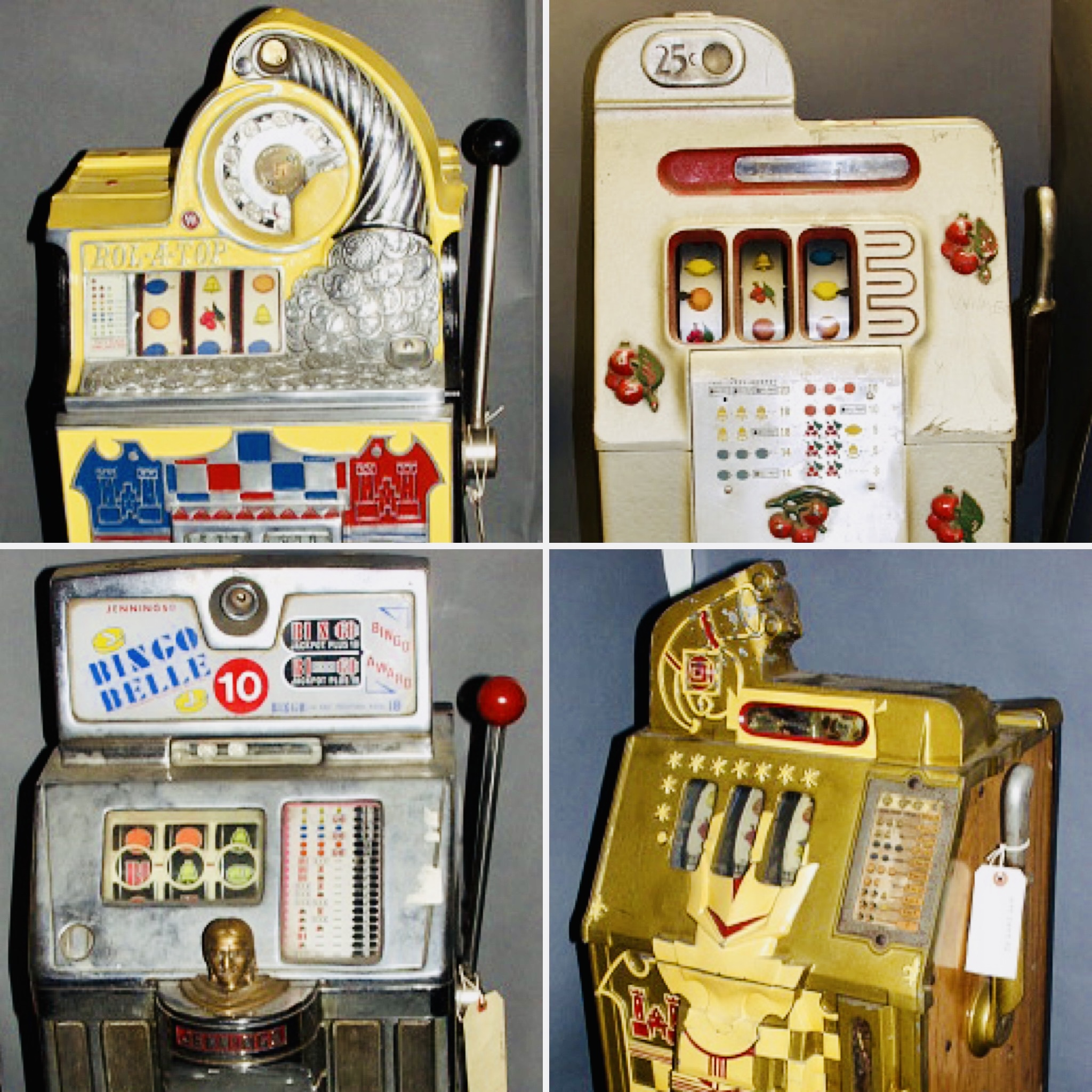
Slot machines in collection of National Museum of American History, transferred to the Smithsonian after being confiscated by the U.S. Marshal's Service

In early 20th-century California, there were countless venues for gaming, and their importance only grew as the Roaring Twenties collapsed into the Great Depression: "Slot machines could be found in the rear of many restaurants. Pinball machines that paid off in cash helped pay the rent in many small-business establishments". Many of the sins attributed to Prohibition were equally associated with gambling, which was America's biggest underworld business by 1931. Many of the places in Los Angeles that were storied "secret" bars were also secret or not-so-secret casinos. For example, at Frank Sebastian's Cotton Club on Washington Boulevard, half the reason for the floor show and the "brassy band" was to "drown out the sounds from the casino upstairs". Charles J. Lick claimed to believe he was leasing the "submarine garden" hidden below his Dome Pier to honest aficionados of billiards, but after the heavily guarded basement casino outfitted like a "junior Monte Carlo concession" was raided four times, he canceled the lease. Jack Doyle's place in Vernon had alcohol after neighboring Los Angeles passed the Gandier ordinance—and a card room. Generally speaking, coin-operated slot machines and pinball machines were a poor man's game, that brought in a flow of cash with a profit margin ample enough to make their operators rich over time. There were slots and pinball machines in the back of just about every bar, nightclub, pool hall, amusement park, carnival, ice-cream parlor, and drugstore in the Greater Los Angeles area during the interwar period, and as one nostalgic account put it, "It is probably true that the pinball business was not simon pure...It is probably true that bars paid off big-hitters with beers, and tobacco shops paid off big-hitters with cigars. It is probably true that, worse, money changed hands. It is probably true that more than one L.A. schoolboy spent his lunch money and carfare in a pinball machine and had to walk home from school hungry." A darker interpretation claims that Al Capone once said he'd give up every other criminal enterprise if he could have slot machines, and that slot machines were invented the day the devil was accidentally left in charge of the world.

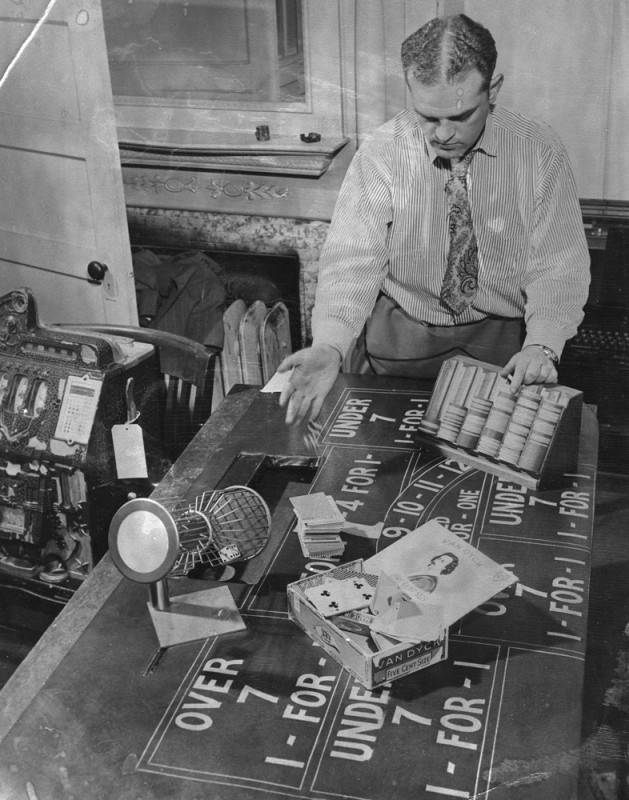
Undated image of slot machine and dice table confiscated in a raid at the "Pico Palace" (Los Angeles Herald Examiner photo via Los Angeles Public Library)

After "bell" slot machines were banned over the course of the 1920s and 1930s in various California jurisdictions, they were replaced by pinball machines, which at that time were not games of skill with flippers and lights, but rather "a gambling game, a bingo game, [where] there isn't any play. You put in your nickel and five balls are released. You shoot the balls and watch them drop into a pattern of 25 holes, each one guarded by a series of pins the size of finishing nails. Each hole is numbered, each number corresponds to a bingo kind of board on the back-box. If you get three, four or five in a row you win 4, 16 or 75 to 1, unless you've pumped in some extra nickels and succeeded in changing the odds to 8, 24 and 96 to 1 or up to 192, 480, and 600 to 1. There's no play. The ball rolls, and you're as helpless to direct it as you are to affect the wheels on a slot machine".

== Early career ==
"Robert J. (Bob) Gans was to become Los Angeles' slot-machine king (since retired) and a political power who frowned on rough stuff and kept his word. A tight little group of other men, unpublicized veterans, sturdy figures in the city's nether regions, worked harmoniously together and divided the tremendous spoils of vice and gambling."
—Dwight F. McKinney and Fred Allhoff, "The Lid Off Los Angeles," Liberty, Nov. 25, 1939, p. 20

Gans was born in New York where "the name Gans was huge in New York tobacconist circles." Gans started his career as an employee of his two brothers, Jonas Joseph "Joe" Gans (1875–1926) and Charles J. Gans (1880–1961), who by the turn of the 20th century had "a pair of cigar shops on Spring Street" operating under the business name J. J. Gans & Bro. According to a 1952 Los Angeles Daily News series on the history of crime in the city: "Two brothers who were engaged in the wholesale tobacco business were quick to see the power for profit from slot machines. They acquired a few and installed them around the city. The brothers were Bob and Joe Gans, the latter now dead for many years. The boys were favorably known in Los Angeles as legitimate businessmen and were well-liked. They were gentlemen and had taken a modest interest in municipal and county elections, staking various candidates to financial help." For example, in 1924, according to the Municipal League of Los Angeles, half of the $2,069 campaign budget reported by Superior Court judge Hugh J. Crawford was provided by his campaign manager, Robert J. Gans.

"Councilmen Albro and Barr expressed the opinion that the slot machines with the new devices would be legal since the element of chance was removed, though the former said that all of life is a gamble. 'I'm in business because I expect to get more out of it than I put in,' said Councilman Albro, 'If you got as much out of it as do these slot machines it would be a cinch,' replied the city attorney...[Charles J.] Gans said he pays $100 per year license on each machines and buys the mints, but when asked if the machines had paid for their operation he replied: 'I should hop to tell you they have. I've been in business here seven years, end business has been very good until the last two weeks.' Councilman Albro said that because Ventura is an oil town and oil workers are under great stress all day they should be 'given a chance to play a game of chance'.
—"Punch Board Drive Begun by Sheriff," Morning Free Press, Ventura, California, August 20, 1929

A 1925 article about Ocean Park refusing to allow J. J. Gans to operate "peppermint vending machines" in the town stated that representatives for the company insisted that "the machines were absolutely within the law, had been decided so by many court decisions and that every time a customer put a nickel in machine he received a five-cent package of mints. Sometimes they received more, but never less". The brothers were described as "wealthy inventors of gambling devices" in September of that year, after being arrested in Avalon on Catalina Island "on charges of maintaining gambling devices in the form of slot machines....According to deputy sheriffs who made the arrest, the two Gans brothers maintained 11 slot machines which paid off in cash instead of the usual trade checks. Justice Hunter notified authorities that he had been warned to lay off the prosecution of the Gans brothers and had been threatened with the loss of his position should he continue with the case".

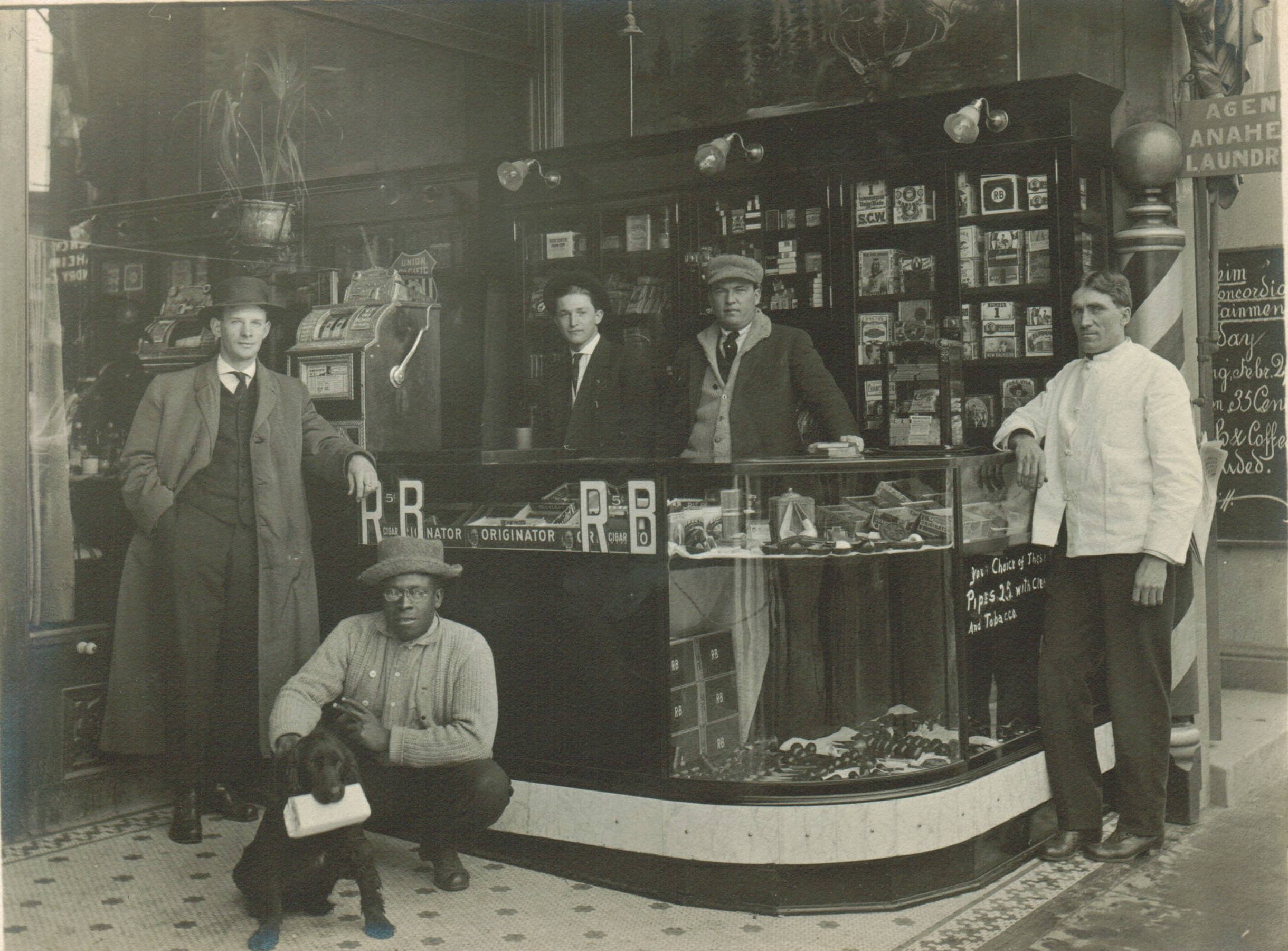
Interior of unidentified tobacco shop c. 1930, probably in Anaheim, California; OC Libraries Digital identifies the slot machine as a 1912 Mills O.K. Gum Vendor

Joe Gans died suddenly in 1926 at La Vida Hot Springs in Orange County's Carbon Canyon, leaving an estate reported to be worth US$250,000 (equivalent to $4,546,523 in 2025). Later, J. J. Gans & Bro. operated as Gans Company, and eventually as Automatic Venders (or Automatic Vendors). Employee Curley Robinson, who worked for Gans for "many years," took credit in 1947 for having expanded the firm's business in "Central America and the West Indies".

In 1927, Bob Gans returned profit he'd made on Julian Petroleum "stock pools"—"Julian Pete" having turned out to be a massive scam that defrauded thousands of people of millions of dollars. Gans was also an investor in Baron Long's Agua Caliente resort and racetrack in Mexico, which opened in 1928. A new district attorney, Buron Fitts, targeted gambling beginning in 1928, repealing a "city ordinance that had legalized slot machines" and raiding "downtown nightclubs and gambling ships off Long Beach," but this did not seem to meaningfully disrupt the Gans operation. The Internal Revenue Service believed that the Gans brothers made profits of between $15 million and $20 million from their slots business in the 1920s.

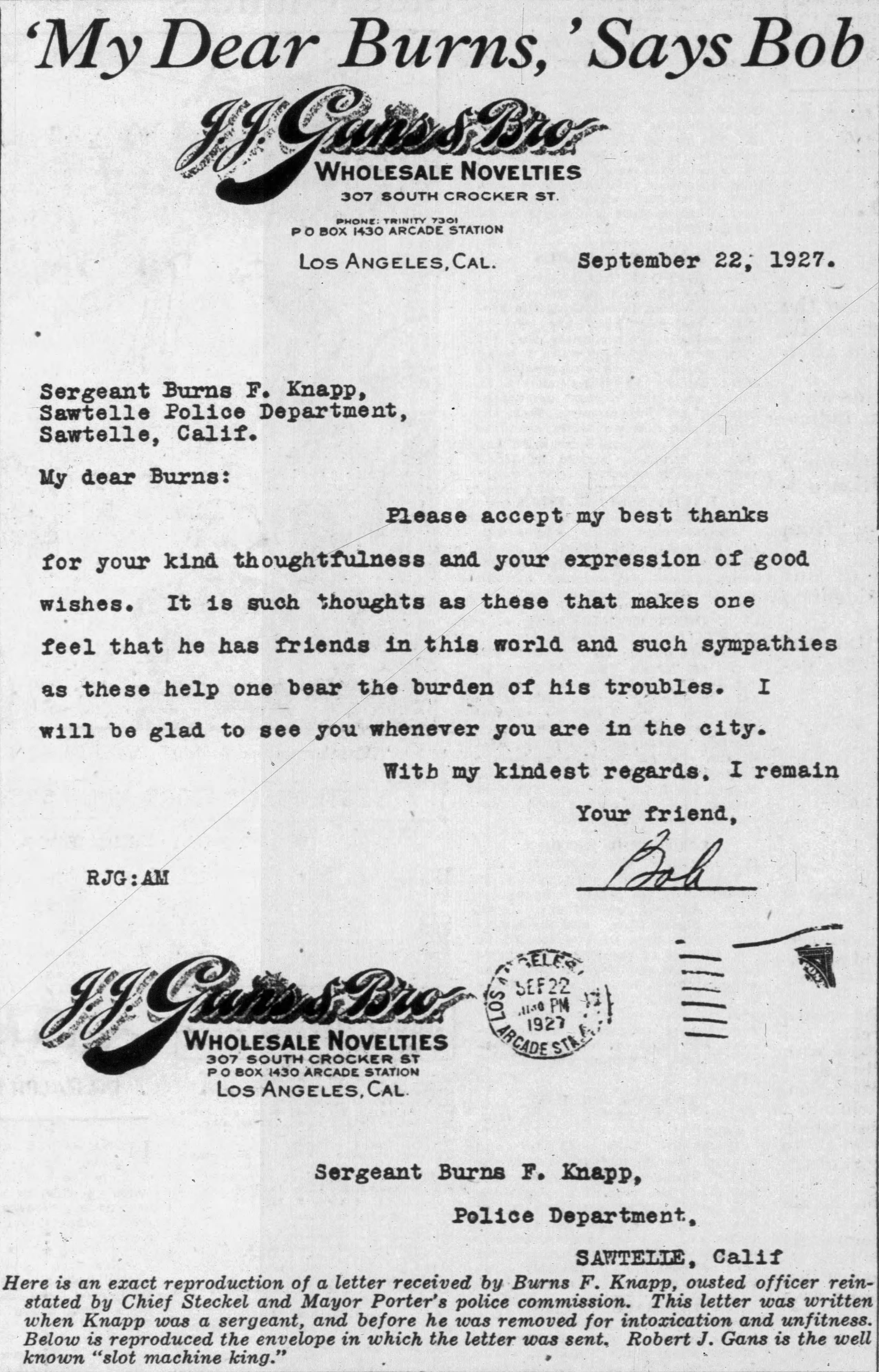
On July 25, 1931, the Los Angeles Evening Record published a copy of a letter from Bob Gans to a once and future Los Angeles police officer, which the Record considered to be suggestive of corrupt cooperation between local gambling rackets and the LAPD

In 1928, bootlegger and pimp Albert Marco was convicted of assault and sent to San Quentin, and in 1931, local underworld boss Charlie Crawford, the Gray Wolf, was shot and killed. The Gans brothers had been associated with Crawford's City Hall Gang, but following Crawford's murder, Guy McAfee took over a great deal of the organized crime in the city, assisted by what was called the syndicate, which included Gans, political fixer Kent Parrot, "king of the bookies" Zeke Caress, bookmaker Tutor Scherer, club owner and bookmaker Farmer Page, attorney Charles Cradick, bookmaker Chuck Addison, and rum runner turned gambling-ship operator Tony Cornero. Organized crime run by the likes of Marco and Crawford under Los Angeles mayor George E. Cryer was "no cheap-change operation. It raked in hundreds of thousands of dollars annually. But under McAfee and Gans, illegal gambling, prostitution, and drug revenue amounted to as much as $50 million a year". As for unorganized crime, there was a stickup at Gans' downtown "novelty shop" in 1932 in which robbers made off with roughly US$2,000 (equivalent to $47,195 in 2025) in cash. According to an International News Service account of the holdup, the office was staffed by 15 collectors and two "girl stenographers," and the $2,000 carried off was in "half dollars, quarters, and nickels, taken from the slot machines by the collectors". Gans' machines reportedly operated unmolested throughout most of the 1930s under the protection of Joe Shaw, brother and secretary of Los Angeles mayor Frank Shaw. According to one history, "To Joe Shaw, vice was a legitimate business subject to the same demands for contributions to the mayor's campaign coffers as City Hall employees and friends and acquaintances seeking city jobs." So long as Gans and associates kept cash for City Hall leadership as a line item in their budgets, they would have free rein to run their businesses as they saw fit. In 1933, the Los Angeles Evening Citizen News editorial page stated, "Bob Gans, slot machine boss who boasts that his contributions to campaign funds enables him to control the police department, the Sheriff's office, and the District Attorney's office has pulled his unlawful robbing slot machines out of Hollywood. Chief of Police Davis says that the slot machines will be driven out of the city. Sheriff Biscailuz says that the slot machines that pay in tokens will remain in the county territory to rob the youth of the city, but that he will drive out those that pay in coins. We cannot follow the Sheriff's logic. We recognize of course the importance of campaign contributions."

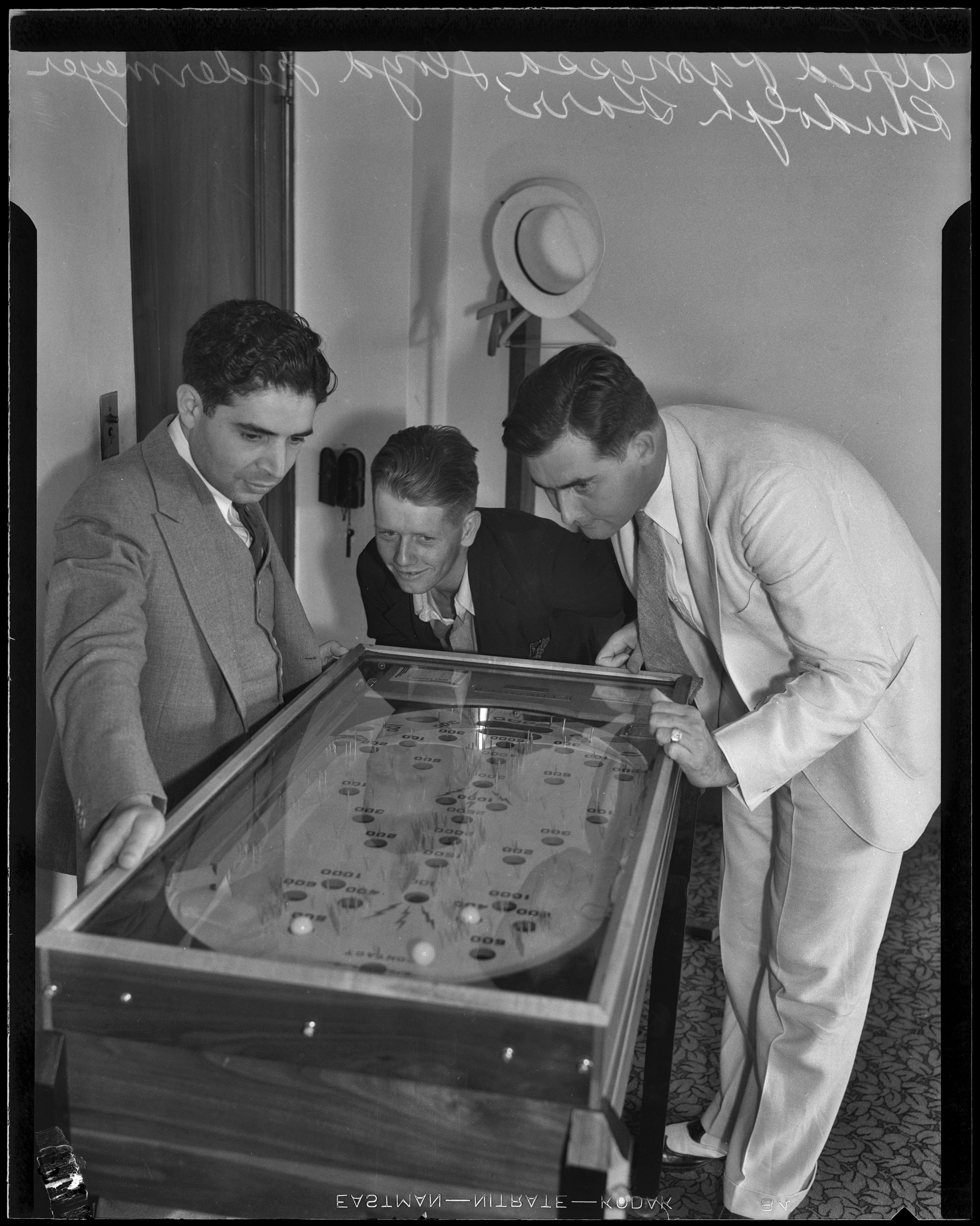
Judge Alfred Paonessa and prosecutor Randolph Kerr observe young Floyd Federmeyer play a marble-board game as part of a trial in 1934, in order to determine if the boards ought to be categorized as games of skill or games of chance (Los Angeles Times photo archive via UCLA Digital)

Despite whatever change prompted the Citizen News to declare a battle won, not much changed as the Great Depression slogged on. Two years later a column in the Eastside Journal described widespread gambling and prostitution: "Something must be done about the prevailing vice conditions in the city of Los Angeles. Beer gardens are serving hard liquors to youngsters and providing a place for street-walkers to conveniently meet their 'customers'...Slot machines, gambling lay-outs, punch boards, and marble machines are apparent throughout the city. An article in a local daily paper recently stated that these various machines, are making nearly $100 million a year for the operators. Merchants have been known to brag that their gambling devices show a greater profit than their legitimate business." In 1935 an informant told the county grand jury that local gambling establishments were well-known to city police (including chief James E. Davis), and that "Open gambling flourished...and proprietors of clubs were tipped off in advance of raids, so that when the raiders arrived the gambling equipment had been put away and there was only dancing and dining." Charles Gans testified at the same time that there had not been any slot machines running in Los Angeles for the past year; deputy district attorney Grant Cooper told the jury that former slot-machine operators were now in the "pin-and-marble game" business. In 1936, Gans reportedly donated $27,000 to the gubernatorial campaign of Buron Fitts.

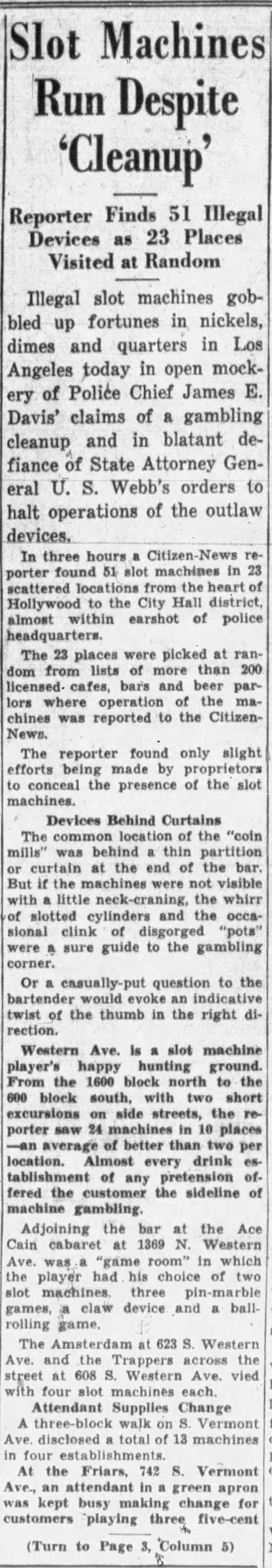
"Slot Machines Run Despite 'Cleanup'" Los Angeles Evening Citizen News, March 27, 1937

Gans was the second listed, after Guy McAfee, of 27 "vice chiefs" identified in a 1937 county grand jury minority report on organized crime, along with Wade Buckwald, Sam Temple, Chuck Addison, Nola Hahn, George Goldie, Eddie Nealius, Joe Botch Davis, Andy Foley, the Curland brothers (Harry Curland and Bill Curland), the "Page boys" (that is, Farmer Page, Ross Page, and Stanley Page), Slim Gordon, Dennie Chapman, Doc Kehoe, Doc Daugherty, Joe Hall, Tutor Scherer, Teddy Crawford, Dick Elgin, Louie Barddeson, Floyd Odin, Rice Baker, "Ex-Bail Bond Murray," High Goldbaum, Dick Consadine, and Lucius Lomax. Cafeteria owner and accidental reformer Clifford Clinton, who was responsible the minority report, alleged that the grand jury had been stuffed with allies of the Syndicate, including a brother of Gans' nephew-in-law Abe Chapman, and a wife of Gans' "auditor". (Note: Abe Chapman and Henrietta Sarah Gans, J. J. Gans' daughter, were married on December 30, 1926, in Los Angeles, by Edgar F. Magnin.) Harry R. Chapman was secretary of the grand jury criminal complaints committee.

On the last day of 1938, following the epochal 1938 Los Angeles mayoral recall election that removed Frank L. Shaw and put Fletcher Bowron in L.A. City Hall, a police raid on a warehouse on South San Pedro Street found 1,200 slot machines bearing the label J. J. Gans & Bro., which was believed to be "the first time an action of this magnitude" had been taken against the "erstwhile impregnable" Gans outfit. An LAPD officer testified in 1939 that he was offered a bribe to protect certain slot machines and similar games under the control of a group called CAMOA, which had extensive offices in the Subway Terminal Building downtown. The officer told a jury details of the local slot-machine business such as that "CAMOA machines had a label which was changed each month. During April and May this was a blue bird...Kendall told me he would pay me from 50 to 65 cents a week per machine to take care" of the 200 to 300 slot machines in the Hollywood area. At the same trial, the person accused of offering the bribe claimed, "The gamblers and the marble-machine operators and prostitution interests are using [Clifford Clinton's municipal anti-corruption group CIVIC] to turn the heat on each other...One gambler will call up the Police Department and say he is from Clinton's C.I.V.I.C and demand they arrest a rival. The next day the rival will call up end report the other gambling place. Both the LAMOA marble association and the CAMOA group do the same thing with each other, and they all fight [over] the slot machines".

== Later career ==
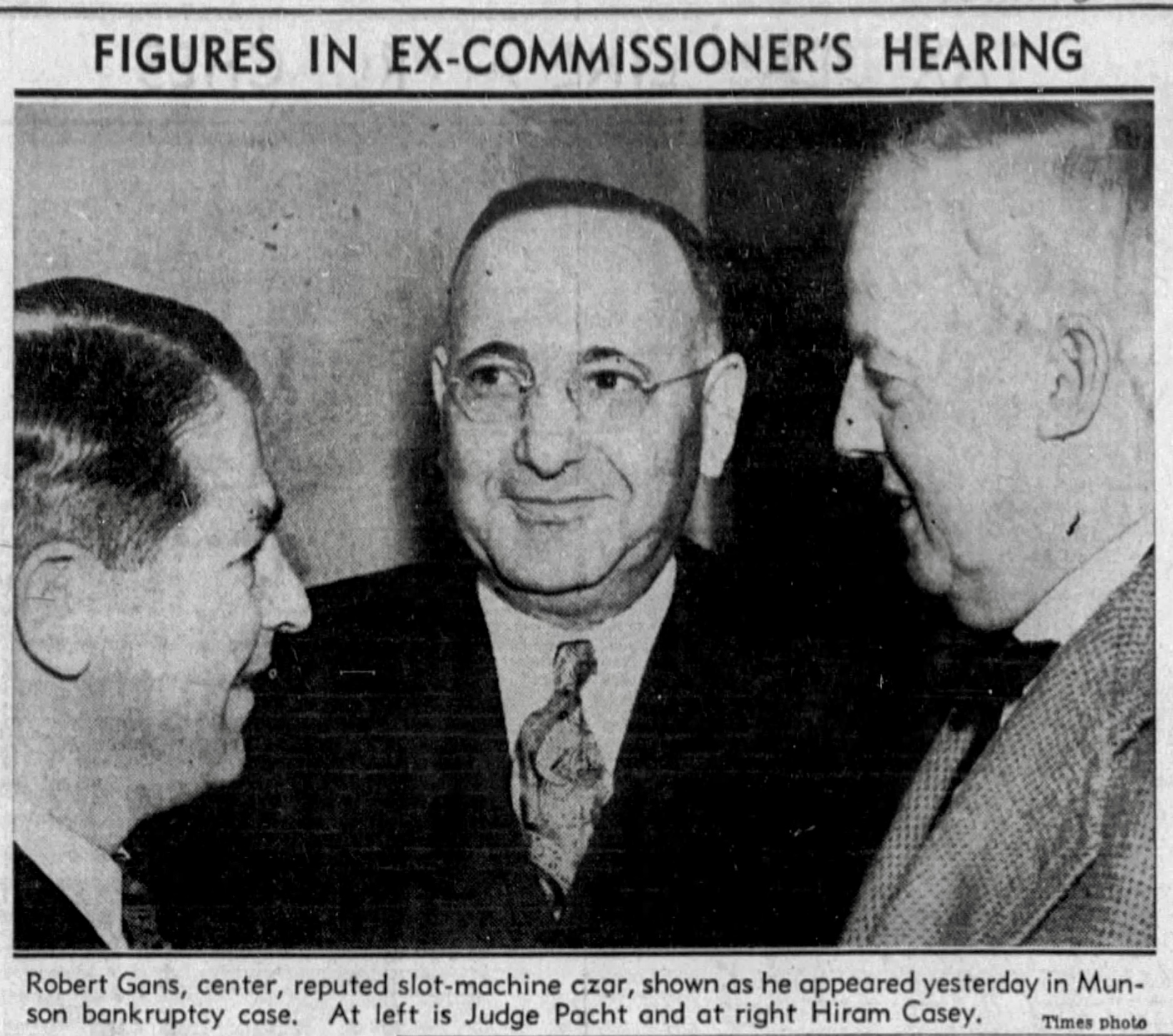
Gans (center), at age 50, pictured with his lawyers, former Superior Court judge Isaac Pacht (left) and Hiram E. Casey (right), at a hearing about the bankruptcy claim of former Los Angeles police commissioner Harry E. Munson (Los Angeles Times, March 10, 1938)

At its peak, the Syndicate is believed to have controlled approximately 300 secret casinos, 23,000 slot machines, 1,800 bookmakers, and 600 brothels in Southern California. Gans allegedly retired from slot machines in about 1938 (after Earl Kynette bombed Harry J. Raymond), handing the reins of the racket over to Curley Robinson. Perhaps not coincidentally, Los Angeles City Proposition No. 3, passed by popular vote in December 1939, banned "pin-ball games, marble boards, scoop claws, and similar devices". The coin-operated games running at the end of the era were "machines that flash little lights, ring bells, buzz buzzers; shoot steel bearings, glass marbles, agate balls; register the totals by agitating dancing girls, airplanes, swimmers, racing cars. They include, in fact, all the tricky machines that seemed as much a part of many a store's fixtures as its showcases".

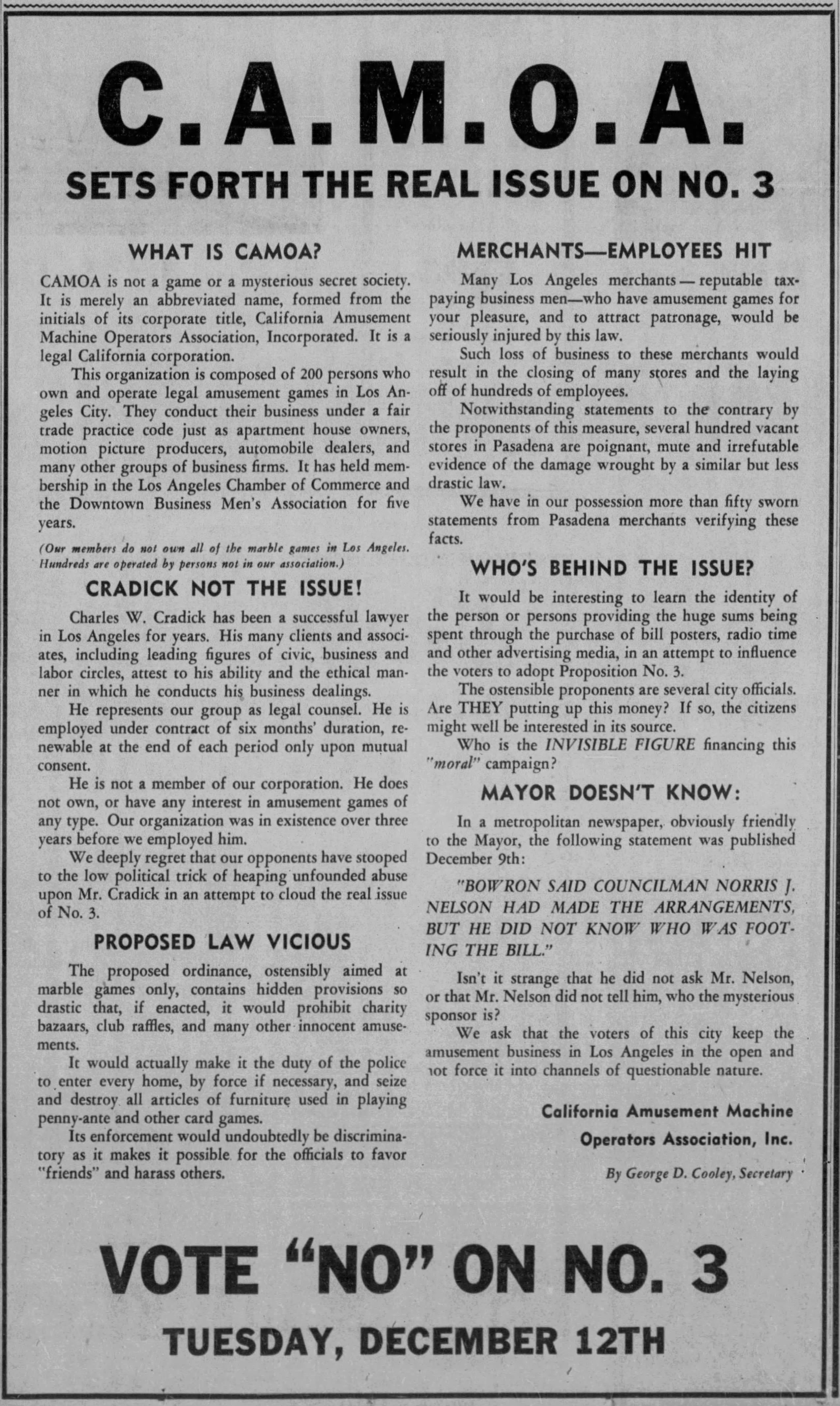
"CAMOA on No. 3" The Los Angeles Times, December 11, 1939

Prior to the passage of Los Angeles City Proposition No. 3, there were roughly 3,000 slot machines in Los Angeles in 1939 that were under the control of CAMOA, the California Amusement Machine Operators Association. The racket was that anyone who wanted to or who was forced to operate slot machines in the city had to pay a certain fee per machine per month to CAMOA. CAMOA then used some of this money to pay city police and county sheriffs to overlook their slot machines or give them advance notice that a vice raid was coming, as well as paying the cops to enforce anti-gambling statutes against anyone who was running slot machines who wasn't a dues-paying member of CAMOA. In 1940, three members of a local gaming firm were arrested on charges of income-tax evasion, which resulted in a courtroom disclosure hinting at Gans' business practices: "Faint rumbles were heard yesterday of a slot-machine war in which Morris and Frank Kozinsky and their sister, Nettie K. Segal, allegedly tried to muscle in on territory which Bob Gans claimed as his own. The Kozinskys were said to have harvested hundreds of thousands of dollars and everything was going along in great shape, until Gans became irked. As a result, said investigators for the internal revenue department, the Kozinsky machines were knocked over repeatedly but they refused to weaken and the war was going full tilt when the pinball machines were kayoed by vote of the citizenry". Police testimony in 1939 asserted that that analysis of one Los Angeles slot machine, which had been confiscated in a raid on a Scheffler brothers warehouse at 1823 South Hope Street, found that "the take for the slot-machine owners is about 30 percent. There is but one chance in 1000 to win a jackpot, and for every dollar invested by a player the return is about 66 cents." As Bowron oversaw a drastic LAPD house cleaning in 1939, he told reporters asking about personnel changes: "No one is satisfied with the department except Bob Gans, Charley Craddick, and Chuck Addison". The World War II draft registration card submitted by Gans' nephew-in-law Abe Chapman in 1940 listed his employer as Automatic Vendors, located at 1612 W. Pico Blvd. The one-story storefront at 1612 W. Pico was one piece of an US$800,000 (equivalent to $18,516,746 in 2025) portfolio of real estate that had been sold off by the same agent in November 1939; the Pico building seller was Security Pacific National Bank. (Note: The portfolio included almost two dozen properties scattered throughout the Southland, from Ocean Park to Lake Arrowhead, and from Malibu to South-Central. The most valuable asset in the collection was the building now called Hollywood Tower Apartments.)

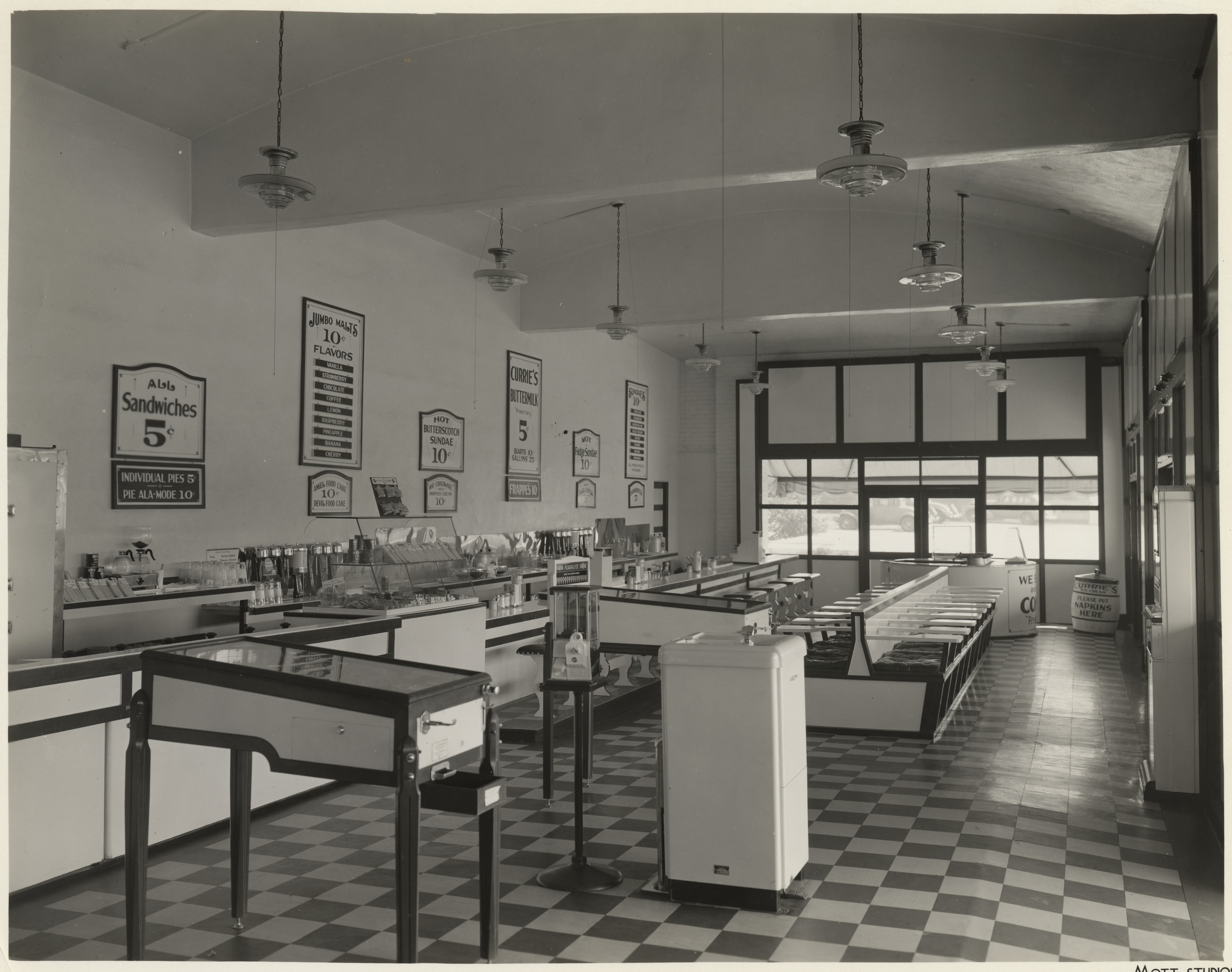
Pinball machines at a Currie's Ice Cream shop, Beverly Boulevard and Vermont Avenue, Los Angeles, sometime in the 1930s (Mott Studios collection via California State Library)

Gans reportedly stayed active in politics after his retirement from business, funding candidates he favored from a fortune estimated to be between $15,000,000 and US$25,000,000 (equivalent to $303,101,504 in 2025). LAPD sergeant Charles Stoker's 1951 exposé Thicker'n Thieves described Gans as "conniving," and claimed that Guy McAfee and Gans gave orders to three lower-level figures: James Francis Utley, Anne Forrester, and Anthony Stralla, aka Tony Cornero. An article in the journal California History asserts that Gans was poorly understood by Los Angeles municipal reformers of the Bob Shuler–Clifford Clinton ilk, arguing, "A similar distortion exists in the reformers' concept of the underworld. They claimed that Guy McAfee was the 'Capone of L.A.,' and that Bob Gans was the 'Slot-Machine King,' but even the Municipal League admitted that both Gans and McAfee were bailbondsmen who engaged in other unethical, but not illegal, activities. McAfee, a former vice officer, was reputed to be both a big-time gambler and a wealthy philanthropist who resided in the fashionable Biltmore Hotel. A similar paradox surrounded the reputation of Bob Gans. While it was true that Gans was the president of a gambling syndicate, the California Amusement Machine Operators Association (CAMOA), it was equally true that he was an active member of the Jewish community and sat on the Executive Committee of the Mount Sinai Hospital. When placed in this light, the Gans McAfee underworld hardly appears as far 'under' as the reformers claimed; and if they contributed $15,000 to [Frank L.] Shaw's campaign it certainly was not a sign of malfeasance." However, another California History article points out that the grand jury investigating possible corruption in the Shaw administration was never able to find "McAfee and Bob Gans, kingpins of the Los Angeles gambling world, who were believed to have fled the city to avoid the jury's subpoenas". A 1949 report from a special California state commission on organized crime did not specifically refer to Gans but described the slot-machine industry generally as a font of untraceable cash that was protected by larger criminal enterprises:

"The pyramidal shape of the slot machine racket is plainly visible. Operators, distributors and suppliers and manufacturers are organized in horizontal and ascending levels. The personnel in the lower levels are easy to identify, but the apex of the pyramid is obscured in such a cloud of secrecy that identification of the true heads of the slot machine racket is extremely difficult...It does appear certain that the distribution and operation of slot machines is wholly in the hands of racketeers in all parts of the country...it is the common practice of slot machine operators throughout the country to pay 10 percent to 20 percent of their gross profit for protection and graft...for bribery and corruption of public executive officers, and that additional large amounts are being spent on a corps of lobbyists and a legal and public relations staff."

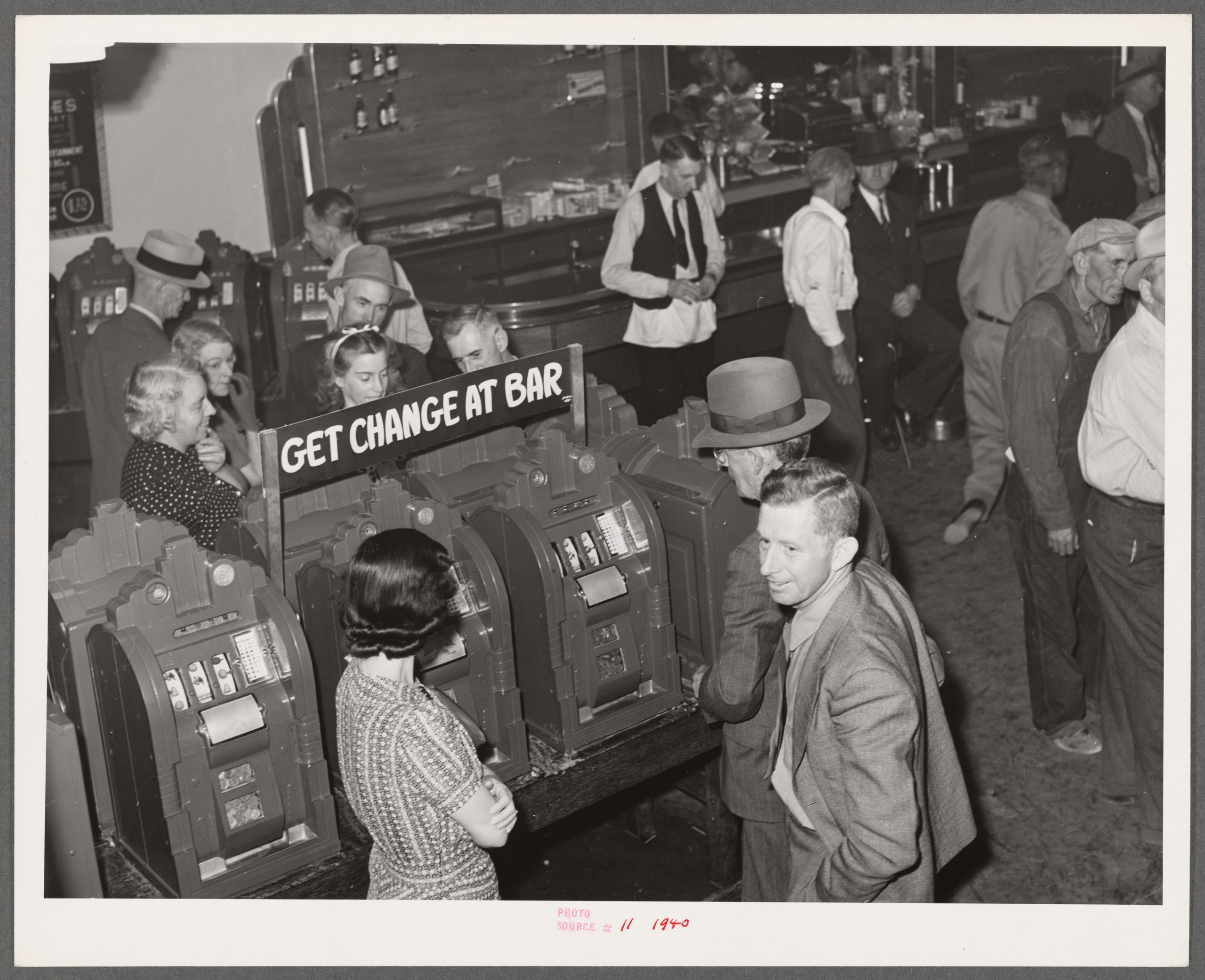
Slot machine players in Las Vegas, Nevada c. 1940 (FSA photo by Arthur Rothstein via NYPL Digital)

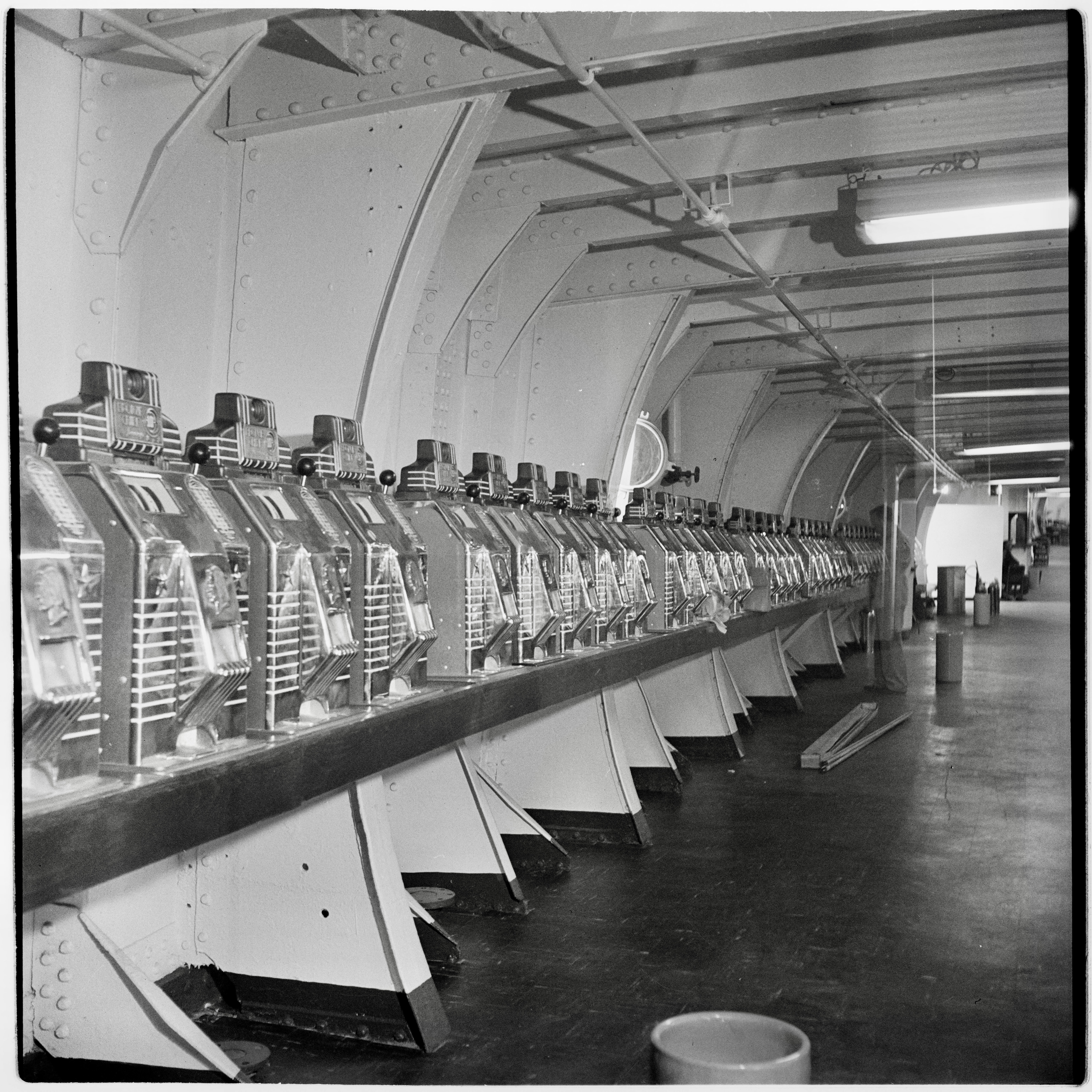
Slot machines on the Bunker Hill, a gambling ship operated by Tony Cornero off the coast of Los Angeles, 1946 (L.A. Daily News photo archive via UCLA Digital)

The commission opposed licenses for slot machines in part because "Viciousness is inherent in the psychology of something-for-nothing upon which the slot machine is based, and it is inherent in the character of the people who operate and control the racket". The 1949 commission, created by California governor Earl Warren, suspected that annual gross revenue for slot machines nationwide was in the vicinity of US$2,000,000,000 (equivalent to $27,062,937,063 in 2025).

According to the Kefauver committee "five powerful syndicate figures" met in a "Hollywood hotel room" in approximately 1950 to discuss a plan to recall Bowron and replace him with a more gambling-friendly Los Angeles mayor. The five people in the meeting were reportedly Gans, Curley Robinson, Max Kleiger, Jimmy "the Eel" Utley, and Sammy Rummel. Kleiger was known as a bookie, Utley "concentrated on bingo and abortion," and Rummel was a lawyer for Gardena poker clubs, Tony Cornero, and Mickey Cohen.

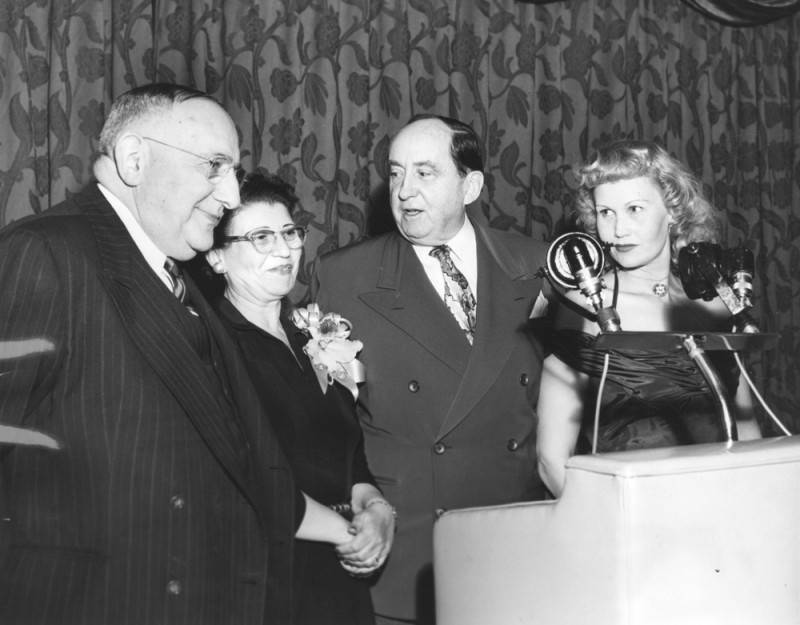
Left to right are Robert J. Gans, Mrs. Benny Whitman, Jerry Giesler, and May Mann at the Ben Whitman Memorial Cancer Foundation dinner at the Ambassador Hotel, April 12, 1950 (Jerry Giesler, Los Angeles Herald Examiner)

In or before 1937, Gans joined the board of what was then called the Mt. Sinai Home for Chronic Invalids in the Boyle Heights neighborhood. He eventually served as the president of the board for eight consecutive terms, oversaw Mt. Sinai's merge with the Los Angeles Sanitorium, and was honored for his service in 1955 with a banquet in the Embassy Room at the Ambassador Hotel that featured entertainers Jeanette MacDonald, Bob Crosby, Dick Contino, and Belle Baker. Gans' community leadership was said to be the result of the good influence of his wife, Effie Wise Gans. When Effie Gans died in 1951, she left substantial bequests to several charities from her personal estate valued at half a million dollars.

Bob Gans died of a myocardial infarction in Los Angeles, California in 1959 and was interred at Beth Olam Mausoleum. He was described in one obituary as a "political figure of the 1930s". Another obituary described Mt. Sinai as "virtually a monument" to Gans, "a former prominent gambling figure".

== Personal life and family ==
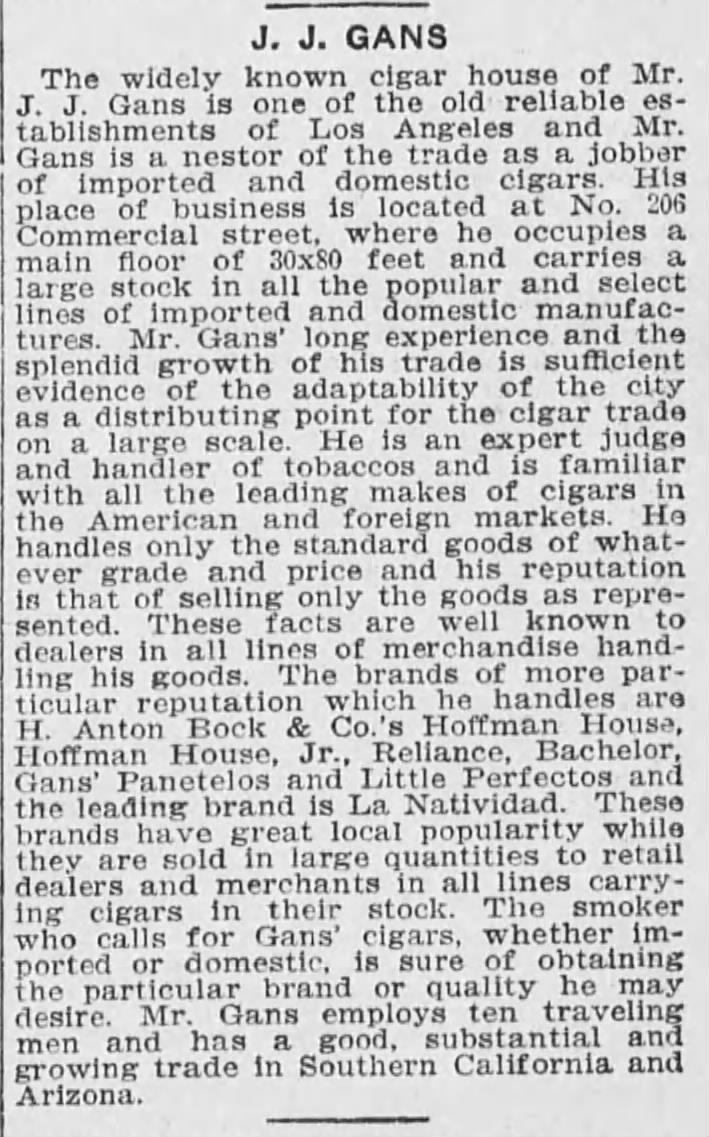
"J. J. Gans" Los Angeles Herald, September 3, 1905

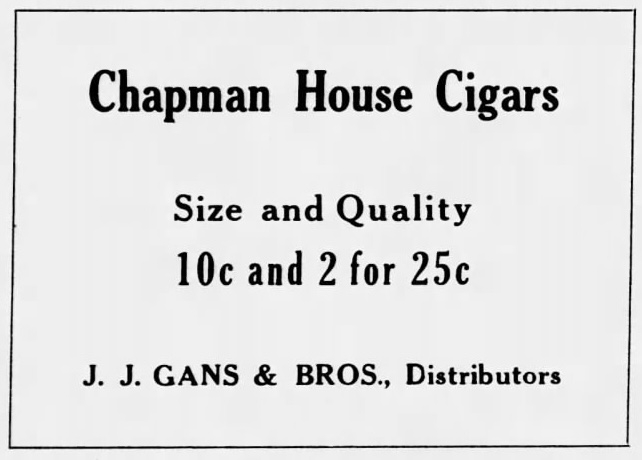
"Chapman House cigars, J. J. Gans & Bros. Distributors" The Tidings, December 17, 1920

Gans was born in Manhattan, the youngest of six children born to Joseph and Henrietta (Goldsmith) Gans. His mother was a native New Yorker, and his father was an immigrant from Germany. Bob's mother died when he was six years old. He grew up and finished high school in New York City where his father and older brothers ran a tobacco shop. In the 1890s, some of the brothers moved out to the west coast, led by J. J. Gans. At age 24, in June 1909, Robert J. Gans, a cigar dealer from Los Angeles, married Effie Wise, daughter of attorney Benjamin Wise and his wife Addie Hyams Wise, in Cleveland, Ohio. In 1910 the couple lived in a rental house on Burlington Street near Shatto Street and Sixth Street in downtown Los Angeles, and Bob Gans was employed at a wholesale cigar business. Bob and Effie's only child, Clifford R. Gans, was born in June 1911. Gans' draft-registration card for World War I stated that he was not in town as of June 1917; that he was self-employed in the wholesale cigar business; that he was solely responsible for his wife, six-year-old son, and an aunt; and that he was tall and slender, with black hair and black eyes. In 1917, the family lived on Dorchester Avenue in Los Angeles. By 1920 the family, in company with Gans' brother-in-law, lived on Van Ness Avenue near what is now Wilton Historic District. They had a mortgage on the house, and Gans' work was owner-manager of a wholesale cigar store.

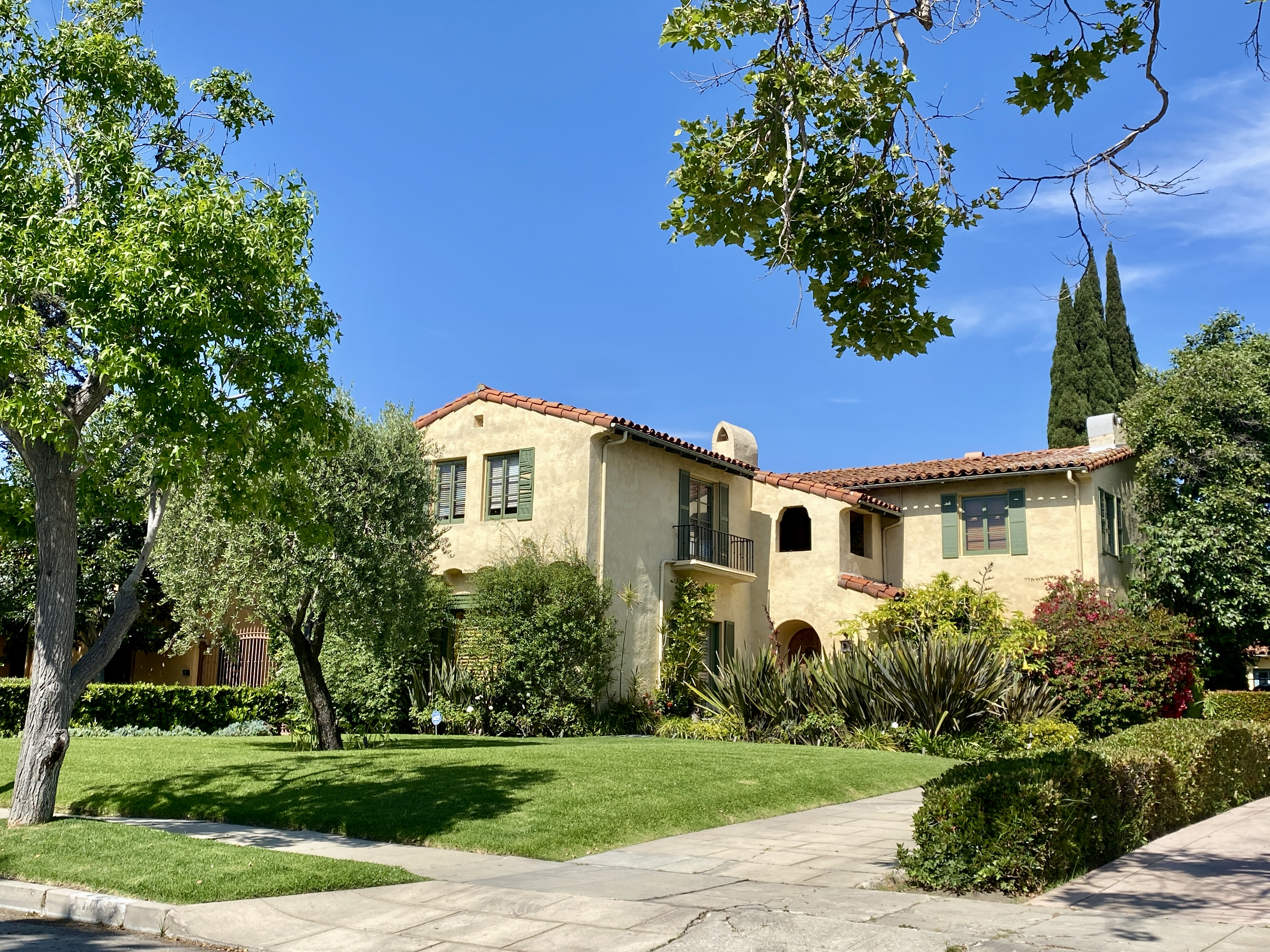
According to public real estate records, the house at 440 North Las Palmas Avenue was constructed in 1928 and renovated in 1938.

By 1930, the family had moved to the home on Las Palmas Avenue that would be Gans' residence for the remainder of his life. The home was valued at $32,500, the family owned a radio set, and they had a live-in maid. Gans' occupation was listed as "executive," he worked in the "wholesale novelties" business, and 18-year-old Clifford Gans was in school. At the time of the 1940 census, Robert J. Gans's work was reported to be vice president of a plastics-manufacturing concern, and Cliff Gans, who had finished two years of college, was recorded as salesman working in the plastics industry. When Cliff Gans registered for the World War II draft, he was employed at Pacific Plastics and Manufacturing, headquartered on Carlton Way, and was described as 6 ft 3 in (1.91 m) and 190 lb (86 kg) with a "low hump on left side of back and & right shoulder definitely higher than left one". Cliff R. Gans earned an associate producer credit on the 1947 film Backlash. In 1950, Robert Gans, age 63, and Clifford Gans, age 38, were both proprietors of a business in the wholesale hardware-manufacturing industry.

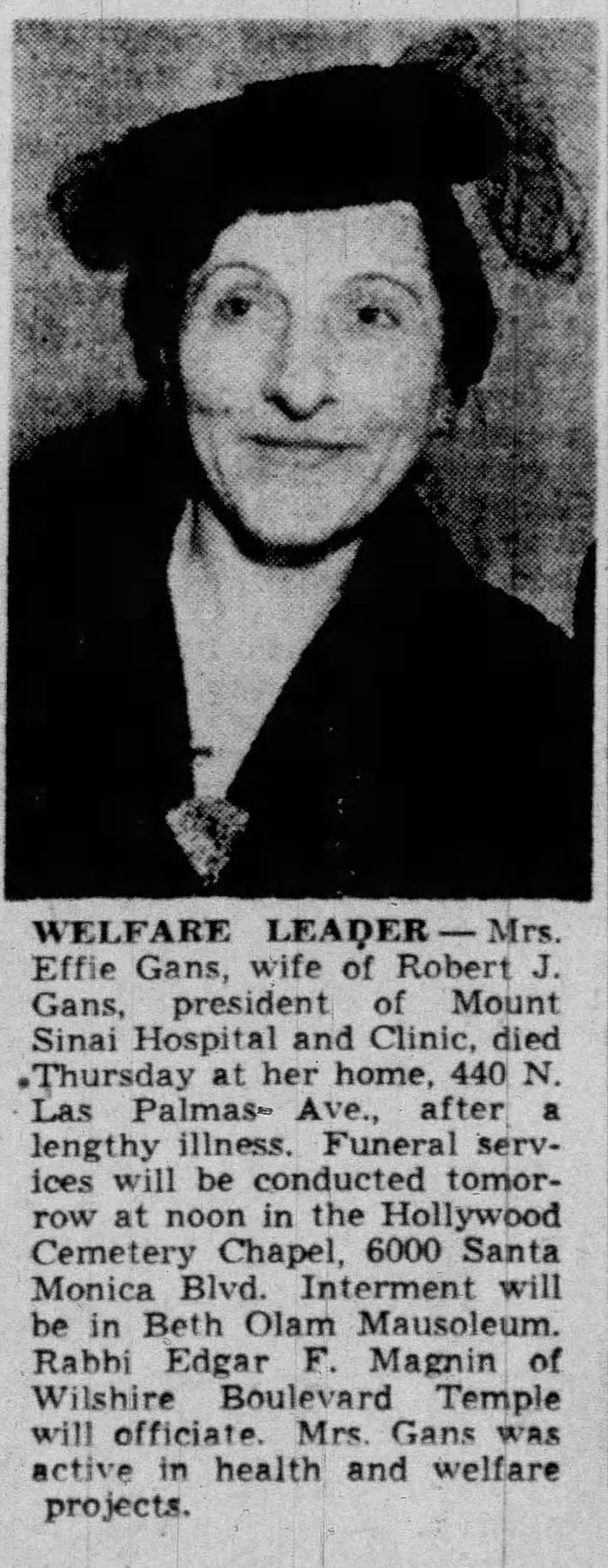
Effie Gans, Los Angeles Evening Citizen News, September 15, 1951

Effie Gans died of colon cancer in 1951, at the age of 64. In addition to supporting Mt. Sinai, Mr. and Mrs. Gans, as a couple, were involved with "the Nathan Strauss Palestine Society, the City of Hope, the Los Angeles Jewish Community Council, and the Wilshire Boulevard Temple." Gans was described in a newspaper report as a philanthropist and clubwoman who left an estate valued at US$500,000 (equivalent to $6,201,923 in 2025), in "a will dated last Jan. 30. The document stated that all of her estate, consisting mostly of cash and securities, belonged to her separately. The will bequeathed a brother, Lawrence C. Wise, $2,000. Three-fourths of the remainder was left to her husband, Robert J. Gans, 440 N. Las Palmas Ave., some of the bequests being made outright and some under a trust fund. The remaining fourth was bequeathed to a son Clifford, likewise partially outright and partially in trust. It was provided further in the document that upon the death of the husband and the son the estate is to be distributed among the widow or the descendants of the son and the charitable organizations, Jewish Orphans Home of Southern California, Congregation B'nai B'rith, Junipero Serra Boys Club of the Catholic Welfare Bureau of the Archdiocese of Los Angeles, the YMCA of Los Angeles, and Mt. Sinai Hospital and Clinic, of which her husband is president."

In 1952, 41-year-old Cliff Gans had an office on the Sunset Strip and was said to be working as a television talent agent. He was reportedly in the midst of moving out of the family home on Las Palmas Avenue and into a new place in Beverly Hills. As part of what was apparently his normal course of business on a Monday afternoon he had US$4,800 (equivalent to $58,195 in 2025) in cash in a safe in his office, and was robbed of it by a stickup man who talked his way in the building by citing a connection with a former business associate of the Gans family. Cliff Gans told the investigating sheriff's deputy that he had that much cash on hand because he was moving money between banks. The names Clifford Gans and Samuel "Curley" Robinson were associated in testimony recorded in Los Angeles in 1958, before the California state subcommittee on rackets.

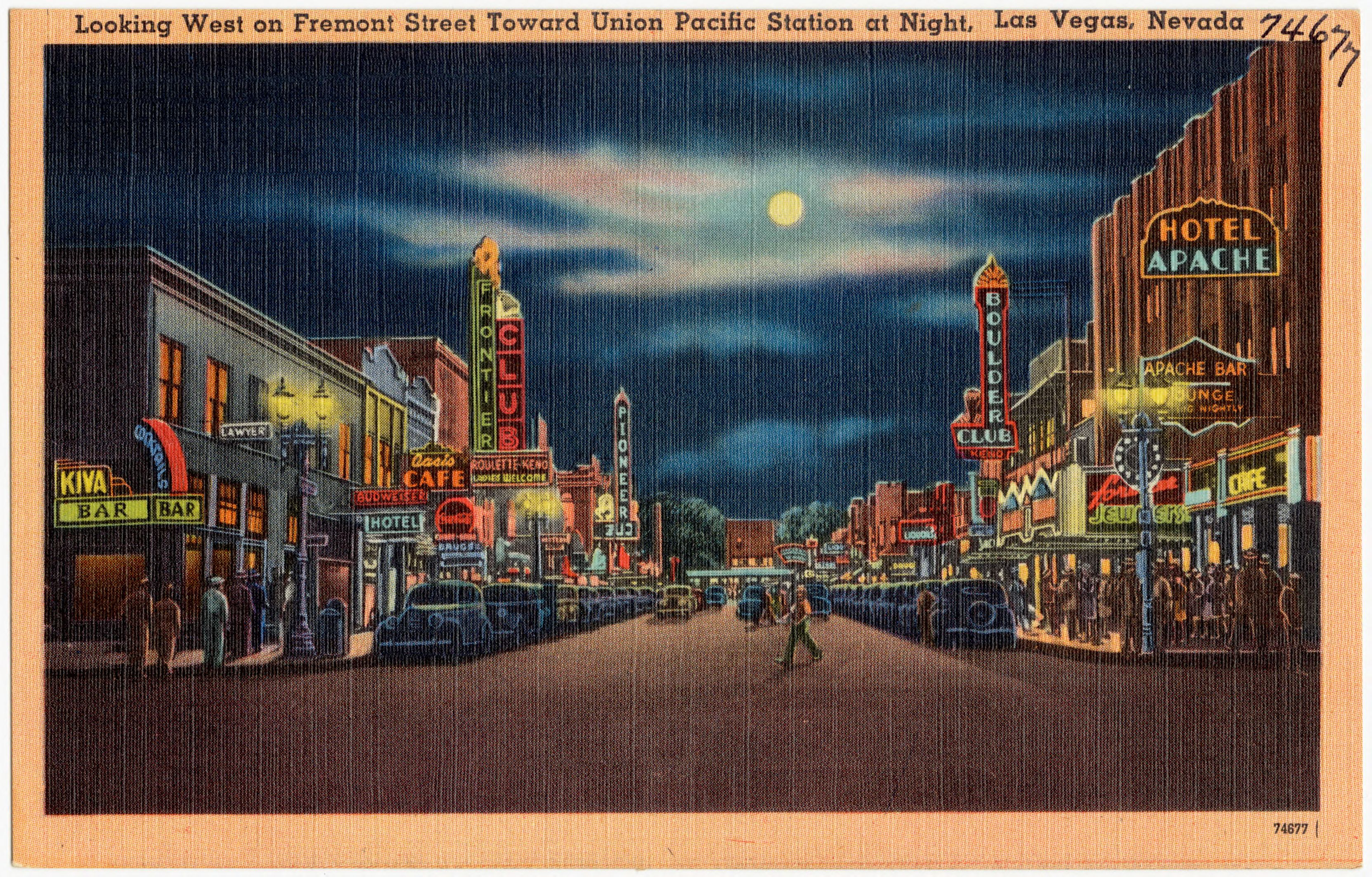
Looking west on Fremont Street towards Union Pacific Station at night c. 1930–1945; several individuals who were named as associates of Gans in the grand jury minority report of 1937 and later histories of the era went on to co-found the Pioneer Club and Golden Nugget casinos in Las Vegas (Tichnor Bros. linen-era postcard via Boston Public Library)

When Bob Gans died in 1959, he was interred beside Effie in a mausoleum at Hollywood Forever Cemetery. In October 1959, a month after his father's death, Cliff Gans married, in Clark County, Nevada, a woman named Sue Jean Millstone, stage name Suzanne LeRoy. Sue Jean, from Missouri and California, was variously described as a dancer and a "blonde showgirl," who was 5 ft 9 in (1.75 m) and was characterized by a male newspaper writer as presenting herself "very high in the hair but low in the neckline". A little less than two years later, the couple was in the middle of a messy divorce that made Los Angeles newspapers, The newspapers described Cliff Gans as the heir to a $1.5 million fortune left to him by his father, "manufacturer and political figure" Bob Gans. When the divorce was finalized, the judge granted former Mrs. Sue Gans the Bel-Air house that Cliff Gans had put in her name, but the judge declined to order alimony payments. The house, on Casiano Way on the Brentwood side of Bel-Air, reportedly had eight rooms and a swimming pool. In 1962, LeRoy reportedly had a penthouse apartment in New York and a chauffeur-driven white Lotus. She also claimed to own 12 mink coats. Suzanne LeRoy was living and performing as the Queen of Diamonds in 1963, at which time one of her colleagues in the "undressed Latin Quarter chorus" volunteered to a news columnist, "Suzanne had a millionaire husband, and he wasn't any gem". (Note: LeRoy remarried in 1964, to "wealthy garment manufacturer" Irving Alfasso. Alfasso was "rumored to have ties to Vegas' Rat Pack entertainers". The marriage did not endure, and the couple filed for divorce in 1965.) As of 1969, Cliff Gans was doing publicity for the principality of Andorra, pitching the "pearl of the Pyrenees" as a travel destination. Cliff Gans died in 1983 and is buried near his parents.

== See also ==
- Los Angeles in the 1920s
- Los Angeles crime family § History
- Jewish-American organized crime
- History of the Jews in Los Angeles
- History of gambling in the United States
- Gambling in California
- List of probability topics § Gambling
- Arcade game and casino game
