= Harry E. Munson =

Los Angeles public official (~1888–1946)

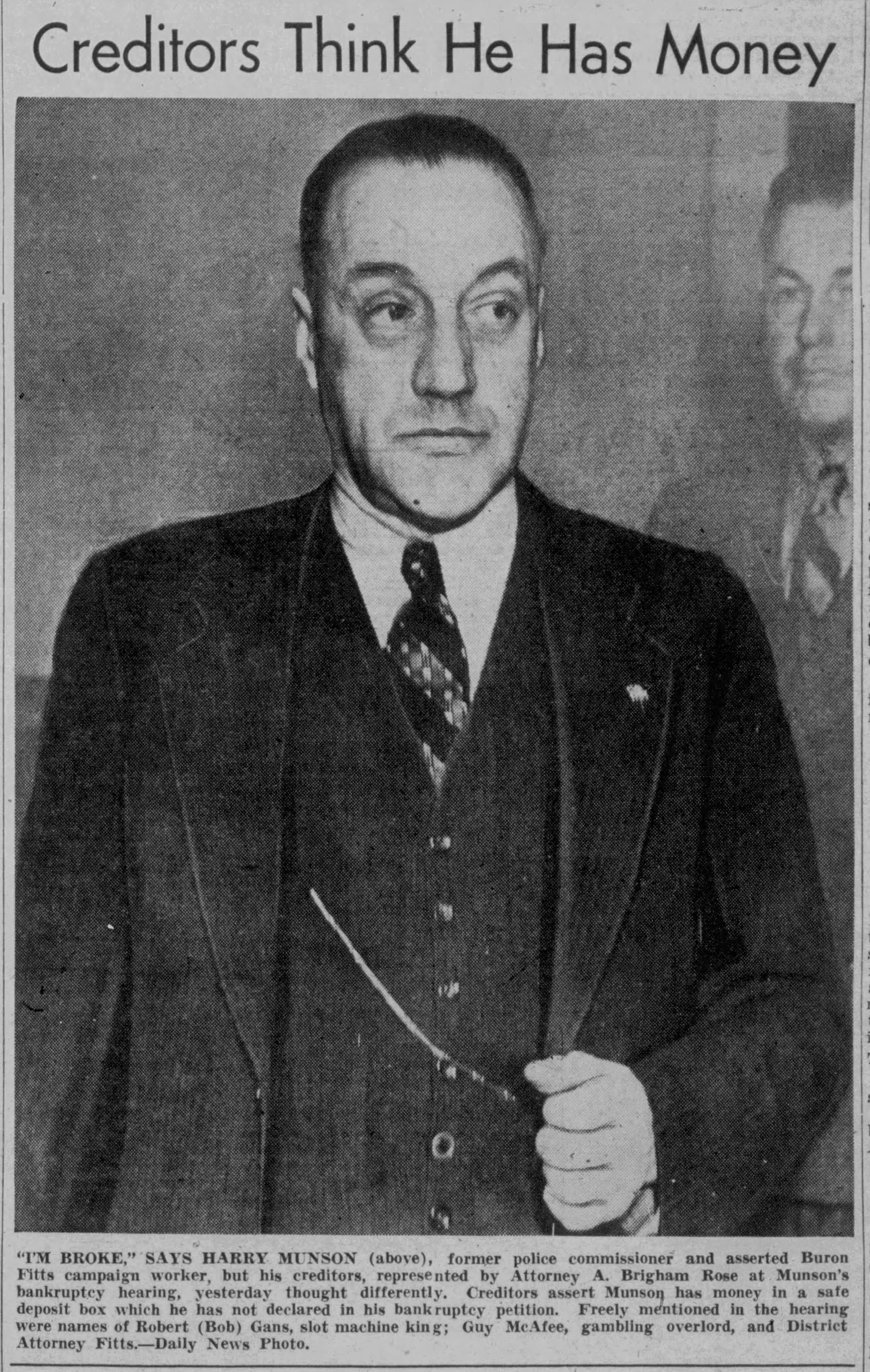
- Born: c. 1888; Sheridan, New York
- Died: December 24, 1946; California, U.S.

Harry Munson was an American public official who served as a police commissioner in Los Angeles, California. Munson moved to Los Angeles in 1911. His professional background was said to be real estate and developing subdivisions. In 1927 he described himself as the developer of the South Bay District of San Diego. Munson was on the Los Angeles Police Commission from August 1933 until February 1934.

He was implicated in a graft and racketeering scandal. According to Liberty magazine, "When Frank Shaw was running for mayor, one of his friends and stanchest supporters was a man named Harry Munson who—later testimony charged—collected 'fistfuls' of $100 bills for Shaw's campaign from the gambling czars, Guy McAfee and Bob Gans. Later Munson was rewarded with the post of a police commissioner".

He died of a heart attack on Christmas Eve 1946 while "walking in front of a hotel".
