= Lucius Lomax =

Los Angeles underworld and civic leader (1878–1961)

- Born: Lucius Walter Lomax; December 24, 1879; Brenham, Texas, U.S.
- Died: June 21, 1961 (aged 81); Los Angeles, California, U.S.
- Other names: Old Man Lomax, Lucius W. Lomax Sr.

Lucius Lomax (December 24, 1879 – June 21, 1961) was an American soldier, gambler–bookmaker, pimp, and real estate investor.

== Biography ==
Lomax was born in Brenham, Tex., and served in the Philippine Insurrection of 1899-1902. From about 1902 to 1918, he ran a number of businesses in Houston, Tex., including a pool hall, and invested in real estate. He departed Texas in about 1918 for the Bay Area. He lived in Oakland and San Francisco until about 1930, when he moved to Los Angeles. In 1933 a columnist in the California Eagle described Lomax as a "big time financier of San Francisco and Oakland...In days of old when Lady Chance was in her hey-day in California, Lucius Lomax would lose or win a thousand dollars without batting an eyelash. Although he gives away thousands to charity he never allows his good deeds to be published. His modesty is a thing sublime". A 1937 grand jury minority report named Lomax alongside figures like Guy McAfee, Bob Gans, and Tutor Scherer as one of 27 suspected "vice chiefs" of the Greater Los Angeles area. His most productive era in California was from the late 1930s to early 1950s.

Lomax was a wealthy and influential figure who was described by many as handsome and mysterious, by neighbors as "the man to see" in the African-American community surrounding Central Avenue in Los Angeles, and by historians as a "surprisingly important" figure in the history of early 20th-century black L.A. Lomax's son, Lucius Jr., ran the Dunbar Hotel Cocktail Lounge, became a newspaper publisher and a lawyer, and ran unsuccessfully for the California Assembly and Los Angeles City Council. The newspaper, edited by Lucius Jr.'s wife, Almena Lomax, was viewed by Almena as "the first step in [Lomax Sr.]'s rehabilitation from mobster to legitimate citizen". Suffering from terminal prostate cancer, he died by self-inflicted gunshot in 1961, leaving an estate estimated to be worth approximately half a million dollars. An obituary described him as someone who built "an empire of wealth through his knowledge of human nature and material values, but still remained modest and unpretentious".
