= Jake Kozloff =

Russian-American businessman

- Born: Jacob Kozloff; 1901; Russia
- Died: April 22, 1976 (aged 74–75); Reading, Pennsylvania, U.S.
- Resting place: Kesher Zion Cemetery, Shillington, Pennsylvania, U.S.
- Occupation: Businessman

Jake Kozloff (1901–1976) was a Russian-born American businessman. He was the owner of the Lebanon Valley Brewing Company in Lebanon, Pennsylvania, in the 1930s. He invested in hotels and casinos in Las Vegas, Nevada, in the 1940s and 1950s, where he was also the president of Temple Beth Sholom. He went on to invest in hotels and casinos in the Caribbean in the 1960s.

== Early life ==
Jacob Kozloff was born to a Jewish family in Russia in 1901. He emigrated to the United States in 1905, settling in Reading, Pennsylvania.

== Career ==
Kozloff served as the owner, president and treasurer of the Lebanon Valley Brewing Company on North Seventh Street in Lebanon, Pennsylvania, from 1933 onwards. He remained its owner until the late 1940s, when he sold it.

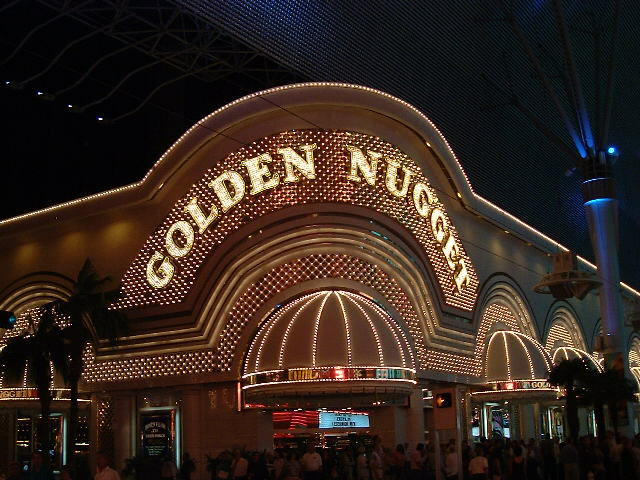
The Golden Nugget in Las Vegas, Nevada.

Kozloff moved to Las Vegas, Nevada, in the late 1940s, where he invested in casinos. He first invested in the Thunderbird Hotel (alongside Joe Wells, Jack Lane, Guy McAfee), and served as a manager.

With Guy McAfee and Beldon Katleman, Kozloff acquired the Frontier Hotel from Bill Moore for US$5.5 million in 1951. Kozloff served as its manager from 1951 to 1955. In 1955, when he paid US$100,000 for Mario Lanza to perform for two weeks at the casino, Kozloff bragged that it was the highest salary an entertainer had ever received in a Las Vegas casino. When he stepped down, Kozloff was succeeded by Beldon Katleman.

Kozloff subsequently invested in the Golden Nugget and again served as its manager. In 1956, Kozloff signed a 20-year lease of the Royal Nevada hotel in Las Vegas with conductor Phil Spitalny from Frank Fishman. In June 1957, he became the manager of the Thunderbird Hotel once again.

Meanwhile, the gambling application for the Hacienda, a hotel in Paradise, Nevada, was delayed by Robbins E. Cahill, the founding chairman of the Nevada Gaming Control Board, in 1956, partly because Kozloff, who had invested US$250,000 in cash for a return of 12.5%, was turned down for a gaming license. The casino had 32 other investors. However, by 1958, Kozloff was the main investor in the Hacienda, another casino in Paradise, Nevada.

Kozloff and Clifford A. Jones were majority shareholders of the Grand Antilles Casino in Port-au-Prince, Haiti in 1958. In 1964, they invested in casinos operated by the InterContinental Hotels Group in the Caribbean. Three years later, in 1967, Kozloff was the manager of the Aruba Caribbean Casino in Aruba.

== Judaism ==
Kozloff served as the chair of the United Jewish Appeal in 1951. He subsequently served as the president of Temple Beth Sholom in Las Vegas, Nevada from 1951 to 1953.

== Death ==
Kozloff died on April 22, 1976, in Reading, Pennsylvania. He was 76 years old. He was buried at the Kesher Zion Cemetery in Shillington, Pennsylvania.
