= Jimmy Utley =

Los Angeles underworld figure (1902–1962)

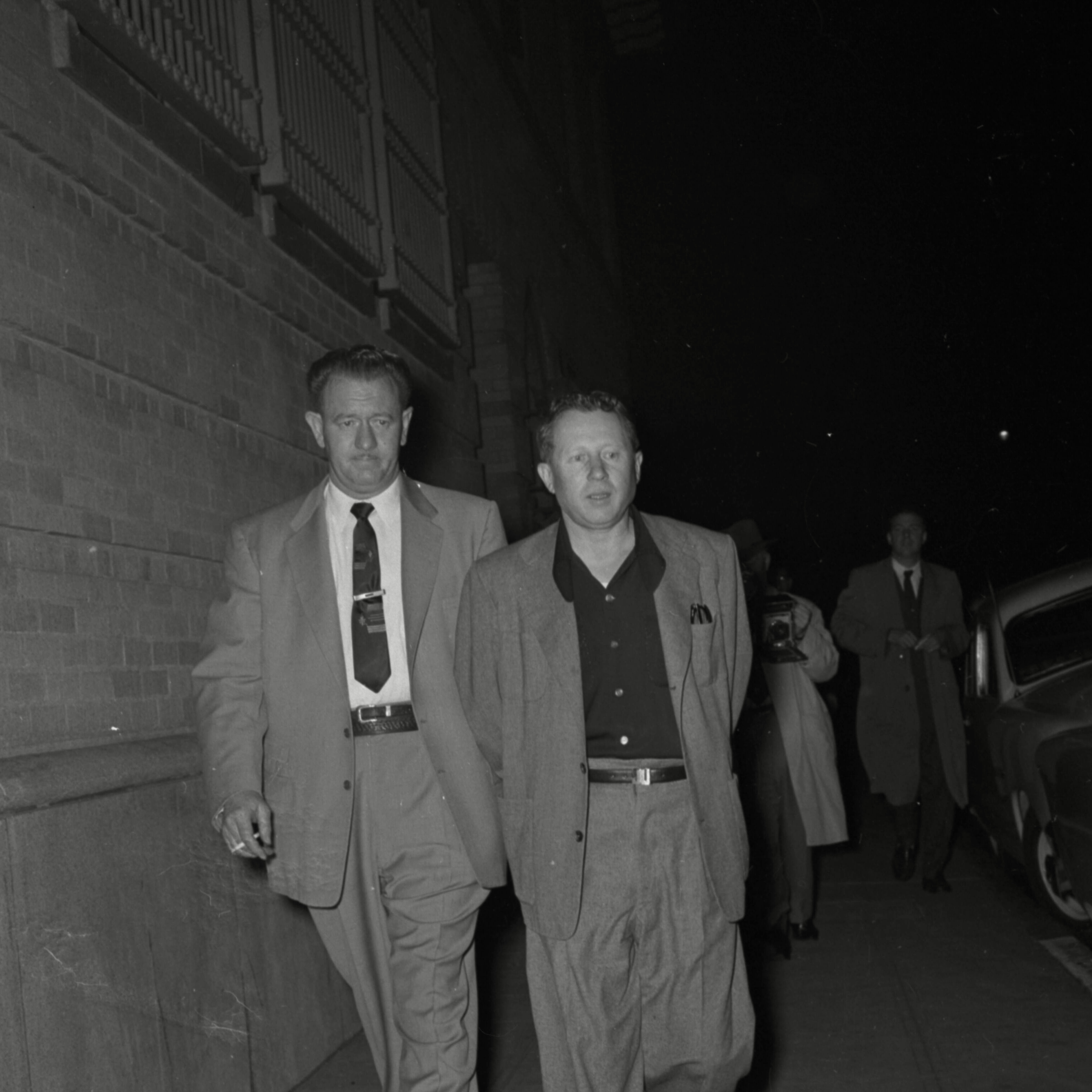
- Jimmy Utley being taken to jail, Christmas Day 1954 (Los Angeles Times photo collection via UCLA Digital)
- Born: December 4, 1902; Connecticut
- Died: October 19, 1962; Folsom Prison, California, U.S.

James Francis Utley (December 4, 1902 – October 19, 1962) also known as Jimmy "the Eel", James Baxter, and James Bradley, was an underworld figure of mid-20th-century southern California in the United States, known for running bingo games and an illegal-abortion ring.

== Career ==
In 1942, Mickey Cohen and a couple of goons pistolwhipped Utley for conversing with L.A. cop E. D. "Roughhouse" Brown in front of Lucey's Restaurant. Utley denied having any knowledge of who had beaten him when questioned by other cops. Los Angeles boss Jack Dragna later took Cohen to task for this action. At one point Mickey Cohen (wrongly) suspected Jimmy Utley was responsible for shooting of Neddie Herbert.

During the administration of Los Angeles mayor Fletcher Bowron, Utley got together with four associates in a hotel room in 1949 to see if the anti-gaming mayor could not possibly be recalled. The other attendees of this meeting included Max Kleiger, a bookie; Bob Gans, who had run slot machines in town since the 1910s; Curley Robinson, who ran slots and pinball machines since Gans' alleged retirement in 1938; and Sam Rummel, Mickey Cohen's lawyer.

According to a 1950 California state report on organized crime, "Utley is not a gang leader in the ordinary sense of the word; he is the proprietor of a number of gambling enterprises, the financial backer of many others, and is associated with a group known as 'The Five,' which is presently seeking to exert underworld control through political activity. It will be remembered that Utley was the victim years ago of a pistol whipping at the hands of [Mickey] Cohen and one of his fellow hoodlums in a Los Angeles restaurant. His career since 1939 has been relatively obscure. Before that, he had acquired a record of 11 arrests in the years from 1928 to 1939 for robbery, pimping, extortion, and violations of the narcotics laws, although he was never convicted. Among Utley's enterprises is the promotion of 'bingo' games, a form of lottery in which his investments extended as far north as San Mateo County in the San Francisco area. The latter project failed, however, when the district attorney's office of that county successfully prosecuted the operators of the game and prevented it from reopening. During the same period of time, similar action in Los Angeles resulted in the closing of his bingo games there."

At one point in his career, Utley told police that he had "acted as go-between" between Charlie Cradick, who ran "pin-games" in the city, and Clifford Clinton, who ran a municipal anti-corruption crusade called CIVIC. Supposedly, "Cradick traded information for immunity from CIVIC's prodding".

Circa 1953, the Los Angeles Illustrated Daily News claimed Jimmy "Early Foot" Utley was one of several underworld figures who frequented Culver City's Toddle House—said to be a center of prostitution—and that at one time Utley had been a "dope peddler".

Utley went to prison in 1956 when he was convicted of running a business offering illegal operations (a common euphemism for abortion) that reportedly grossed US$500,000 (equivalent to $5,782,742 in 2024) annually. He was sentenced to 10 years in Folsom prison, and died there of a heart attack in 1962.
