= Curley Robinson =

Gaming association leader (1892–1966)

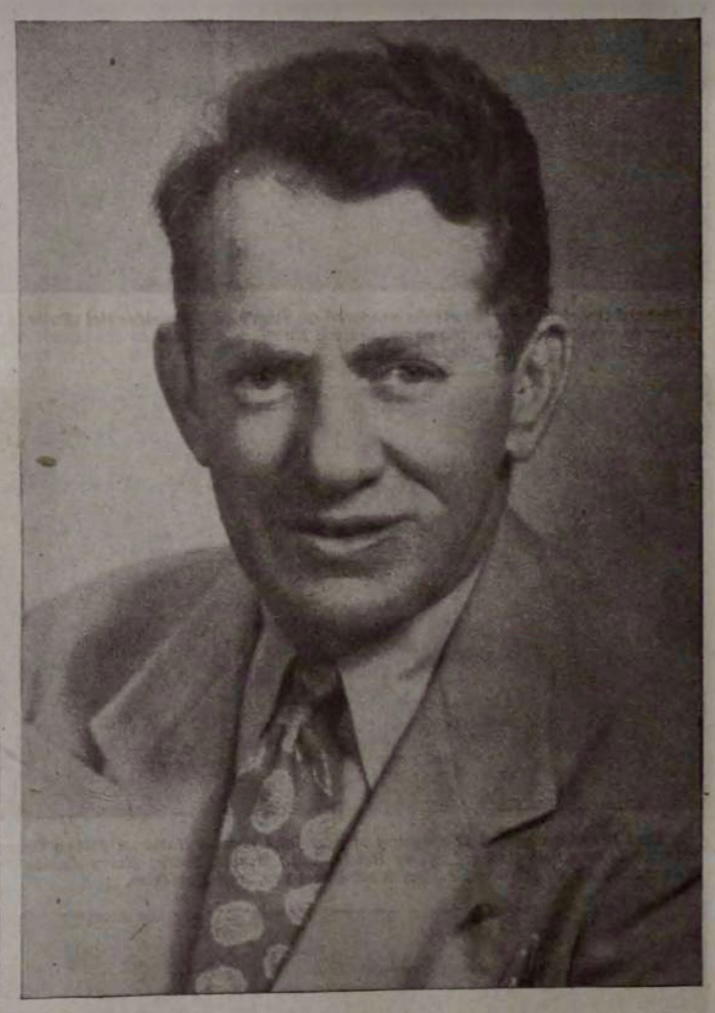
- Born: July 11, 1892; Oakland, California, U.S.
- Died: December 18, 1966; Los Angeles, California, U.S.
- Other names: Curly Robinson

Samuel "Curley" Robinson (July 11, 1892 – December 18, 1966) ran coin-operated slot machines and pinball machines and other gambling operations in Los Angeles County, California, United States, following the retirement of Bob Gans.

== Early career ==
Robinson was born in Oakland, California, but spent most of his life in Los Angeles. Before World War I, "after an early experience with newspaper circulation" (newsboy? paper route?), he ran a "barbershop, cigar, and pool room" on 11th Street in downtown Los Angeles. During the First World War, Robinson served in "infantry as a sergeant, saw action in France, was wounded and was decorated by both the United States and France". Los Angeles sports columnist Max Stiles knew Robinson during this era and stayed friends with his brothers Jake and Saul. Stiles wrote, "When I first went to work for the Examiner as a copy boy in 1917 Curly had a little snack and smoke shop across 11th Street called the Blarney Castle. One day, a week or so after I was on the job, Curly raffled off a German World War I Mauser rifle. I won it, then didn't know what in the devil to do with it."

From 1925 until June 1937, "in partnership with Carl Laemmle," Robinson was president and general manager of business of Studio Concessions Company, Inc. In 1935 he was described as the operator of a "newsstand and cigar counter in the cafe at Universal City where he sells everything from soap bubble pipes to Prince Matchabelli perfume. 'Curley' and his brother Jake used to run that place on Eleventh just around the corner from Broadway where all the Examiner boys got their cigarets, cokes and candy bars. Besides loaning five bucks to every newspaperman down on his luck 'Curley' brought up his young brother Saul, now one of Southern California's leading dermatologists." Years later, San Fernando Valley newspaper columnist Florabel Muir recalled that when she'd been a young scenario writer at Universal Studios, one of Carl Laemmle's male relatives who lived on the studio lot had a weakness for slot machines. She recalled, "Plenty of studio workers were also suckered into tossing their silver coins into the maw of the one-armed bandits. It was a low point in the fortunes of the old Universal Co., whose heyday seemed to be over for good. Uncle Carl brought in a well-known character named Curley Robinson and gave him a concession to operate a curio shop. The slot-machine racket was going full blast around town at the time, and Curley had 15 or 20 of them installed. And every lunch hour sounded like a Las Vegas casino as studio toilers and visiting rubberneckers poured in their contributions. Cowboy hats, belts, chaps, and even six-shooters were on display in the store, and it all helped to create a genuine Western atmosphere, especially when a group of cowboy actors would saunter in. Of course, Uncle Carl was never around in person. He wasn't far from the end of his colorful career then, and he could usually be found in a certain Vine St. emporium in the company of Nick the Greek, who was his handicapper in race track investments. The slot machines didn't last long. By the time Uncle Carl's son, known as 'Junior,' came along to run the studio, Sheriff Gene Biscailuz ordered them out. The pinball machines which replaced them didn't last long either."

== Later career ==
Bob Gans, who had been the region's "slot machine king" for many years, retired in about 1938, apparently ceding control of the business to Robinson. Around the same time, Robinson was apparently partners with Eddy Neales and Milton "Farmer" Page in the Clover Club, "a high-rolling Hollywood nightclub and casino just west of the Chateau Marmont above the Sunset Strip". To keep the club open, the proprietors regularly paid Los Angeles County sheriffs a small fortune in protection money. When Mickey Cohen wanted in the action and the partners refused, he roughed up Neales, raided the club multiple times and carried off the cash on hand, and even robbed patron Betty Grable of a diamond necklace she was wearing. After shooting and/or killing a number of people, and driving Neales out of the country, Cohen got control of the club. In 1940, a county grand jury was told that "George Contreras of the Sheriff's vice squad was interested in 2000 marble and slot machines" and Robinson was one of the witnesses summoned to testify.

In 1942 the Long Beach Independent threw a fit in editorial form when Robinson tried to expand his slot-machine racket there, with the assistance of lawyer Fred Howser and "Mrs. Martha W. Campbell, president of the Women's Better Government League". According to the editors of the Independent, "Mr. Robinson was an associate of Mr. Charles Cradick, the genius behind the Los Angeles pinball machine outfit called CAMOA, which folded when Los Angeles voters ran the pinball machines out of town. Mr. Robinson, thereupon went into the county, where he was said to have established good relations with some law enforcement official called 'Cactus Eye' and has been doing quite well since that time and, being ambitious, is trying to set up in Long Beach. Years ago he was associated in a minor capacity with Mr. 'Bob' Gans, the so-called 'slot- machine king'."

In the 1940s, Robinson was the head of the Associated Operators of Los Angeles County (AOLOC), a trade group representing owners of slot machines and other coin-operated games. According to L.A. Noir (2010), Cohen and Robinson's "racket was an association that every distributor in the region had to join. But Robinson was having problems. Some of its members had gotten a bit independent minded." Robinson invited Cohen to a meeting to help sort things out; Cohen came to the meeting accompanied by three goons: hit man Hooky Rothman, Big Jimmy, and Little Jimmy. As the meeting got underway they cracked several skulls, and the membership decided Robinson's way was a good way to go.

In 1955, when unidentified gunmen shot up the home of "Bingo King" Max Kleiger in Pacific Palisades, the Los Angeles Mirror reported, "The beach front gambler's name popped up in Kefauver committee testimony here a few years ago in connection with an alleged plot to recall then Mayor Bowron so that open gambling could run in the city. The committee reportedly received evidence of a meeting of five powerful syndicate figures in a Hollywood hotel room." The five people in the meeting were reportedly Bob Gans, Max Kleiger, Jimmy "the Eel" Utley, Curly Robinson, and Sammy Rummel. Gans was the town's one-time "slot-machine king," Robinson was the town's "pinball-machine king," Kleiger was a bookie, Utley "concentrated on bingo and abortion," and Sammy Rummel was Mickey Cohen's lawyer.

Robinson died in 1966. One sportswriter described him as a former "Hollywood agent and for many years the pinball king of the city," commenting that "Curly has been a leading citizen of West Los Angeles and Beverly Hills for more than 30 years".
