= Charles Cradick =

American attorney and political staffer (1897–1954)

Charles W. Cradick
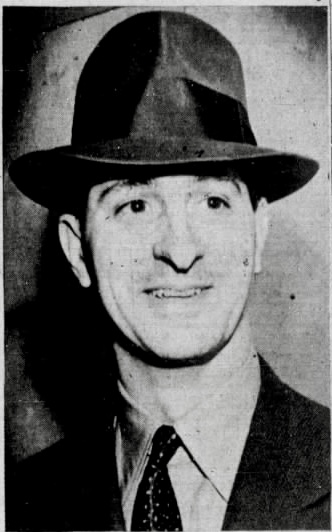
- Born: Charles William Cradick; February 11, 1896; Kentucky
- Died: January 14, 1954 (aged 57); Los Angeles, California, U.S.

Charles W. Cradick (February 11, 1896 – January 14, 1954) was an American attorney and political campaign manager who worked primarily in Los Angeles, California. Cradick's clients included the California Amusement Machines Operators Association (CAMOA), which was accused by civic reformers of being a front for a slot-machine racket, and the Hollywood film actress Barbara Stanwyck.

== Biography ==
Cradick was born in Kentucky in 1896. Cradick joined the Louisville Police Department when he was 16 years old, and first passed the bar in Kentucky. Craddick served with the American military in World War I. He came to California in 1924. One of his early law partners, Dailey Stafford, later became a superior court judge. He worked as a campaign manager for William I. Traeger in both his campaign for Los Angeles County Sheriff and for the U.S. Congress. Film industry clients included "Jackie Coogan's mother" and Barbara Stanwyck. Cradick represented Stanwyck in her custody dispute with Frank Fay; according to a January 1938 news report, "Under an order issued last week by Superior Judge Goodwin J. Knight, Fay was given the right to see the son, Anthony Dion, twice a week. Charles W. Cradick, attorney for Miss Stanwyck, appealed the decision and advised the auburn-haired film star she did not have to obey Judge Knight's orders until she knew the outcome of the appeal".

When Fletcher Bowron replaced Frank L. Shaw as mayor following the 1938 Los Angeles mayoral recall election, Bowron oversaw a drastic house cleaning of the Los Angeles Police Department and told reporters asking about personnel changes in 1939: "No one is satisfied with the department except Bob Gans, Charley Craddick, and Chuck Addison". Later in the year, after Bowron introduced Los Angeles Proposition No. 3 banning slot machines and pinball and similar within city limits, Cradick led the political campaign urging a "no" vote on the December ballot.

According to a Los Angeles Herald Examiner article about 1930s municipal corruption, when Guy McAfee took over a great deal of the organized crime in the city, he was assisted by what was called the Syndicate, which included slot-machine king Gans, political fixer Kent Parrot, "king of the bookies" Zeke Caress, bookmaker and (later) casino developer Tutor Scherer, club owner and bookmaker Farmer Page, bookmaker Chuck Addison, rum runner turned gambling-ship operator Tony Cornero, and attorney Charles Cradick. As the Los Angeles Times put it in 1954, "Cradick frequently was called to testify before federal and county grand juries regarding vice conditions and bribery charges". In the early 1940s, an ex-FBI agent planted a bug in Cradick's office in hopes of getting evidence of wrongdoing, but Cradick found it and spent two weeks sending the agent (and his employers in Mayor Bowron's office) on a merry chase after false evidence and invented events. In the late 1940s, Cradick worked out of offices on Vermont Avenue.

Cradick died of an abdominal cancer at Cedars of Lebanon Hospital in Los Angeles, after three surgeries over two years failed to halt the progress of the disease. After Cradick's death, Matt Weinstock included an anecdote about him in one of his regular newspaper columns: "Atty. Charles Cradick, who died last week, had a reputation for forthright speech. Years ago, while in charge of a political campaign, he hired a former congressman to make speeches. The former congressman was fond of relating his oratorial triumphs and bragging how he could hold an audience in the palm of his hand. One day Cradick asked him, 'Did you ever hear of Jack Dempsey?' 'Why of course.' the speaker said, 'I've met him. Why?' 'Well,' drawled Cradick, 'he never had to tell anybody he could fight. They found it out.'" When he died in 1954, the Los Angeles Times described Cradick as an important "'behind-the-scenes' political strategist in Los Angeles for a quarter century".

Cradick left no will, but his widow was appointed administrator of his estate, valued at $174,000, although the estate was owed $112,000 more from the sale of Cradick's 112 ft (34 m) power yacht, the Maria Ines. However, payments on the purchase of the Maria Ines were in default at the time Cradick's former secretary "Miss Sybil Adams, 38" filed an additional $48,000 claim against the estate. She claimed that Cradick still owed her money from the sale of "207 shares each formerly held in the Normandie Club, a Gardena poker palace," and that Mrs. Cradick's request for a monthly allowance of $1,000 from the value of the estate was unreasonable since "the Cradicks had been living apart for many years and that he had not supported Mrs. Cradick in such style. Mrs. Cradick denied from the witness stand there had ever been a separation". The judge granted Mrs. Cradick $500 a month pending the settlement of the estate.

== See also ==
- Sam Rummel – American attorney and murder victim (1906–1950)
