= Private Scandal =

1934 film by Ralph Murphy

- Directed by: Ralph Murphy
- Screenplay by: Vera Caspary; Garrett Fort; Bruce Manning
- Produced by: Charles R. Rogers
- Starring: ZaSu Pitts; Phillips Holmes; Mary Brian; Ned Sparks; Lew Cody; June Brewster; Harold Waldridge
- Cinematography: Milton R. Krasner
- Production company: Paramount Pictures
- Distributed by: Paramount Pictures
- Release date: May 11, 1934
- Running time: 62 minutes
- Country: United States
- Language: English

Private Scandal is a 1934 American pre-Code comedy film directed by Ralph Murphy and written by Vera Caspary, Garrett Fort and Bruce Manning. The film stars ZaSu Pitts, Phillips Holmes, Mary Brian, Ned Sparks, Lew Cody, June Brewster and Harold Waldridge. The film was released on May 11, 1934, by Paramount Pictures.

The film's sets were designed by the art director David S. Garber.

== Cast ==
- ZaSu Pitts as Miss Coates
- Phillips Holmes as Cliff Barry
- Mary Brian as Fran Somers
- Ned Sparks as Inspector Riordan
- Lew Cody as Benjamin J. Somers
- June Brewster as Adele Smith
- Harold Waldridge as Jerome
- Jed Prouty as H.R. Robbins
- Charles Sellon as Mr. Terwilliger
- Rollo Lloyd as Insurance Agent Henry Lane
- Olive Tell as Deborah Lane
- Olin Howland as Ed
- John Qualen as Schultz (uncredited)
