= The Meadows Casino & Hotel =

Casino hotel in Nevada, United States

- Interactive map of The Meadows Casino & Hotel
- Location: Las Vegas Valley, Nevada; 36°9′29.7″N 115°6′51″W
- Opened: 1931
- Closed: 1942
- Signature attractions: the Meadows Revue and the Meadow Larks band
- Casino type: Land
- Owner: Anthony Cornero; Frank and Louis Stralla; Alex Richmond; Guido Marchetti, Frank Miller and Earl West; Eddie Clippinger

The Meadows Casino & Hotel (a.k.a. The Meadows Club) was the first resort hotel-casino in the Las Vegas area, opening in 1931. The Meadows was located at Fremont Street and East Charleston Boulevard near the Boulder Highway, and outside the Las Vegas city limits. Its location was designed to attract workers and tourists from the Hoover Dam. The hotel had 30 to 50 rooms (accounts vary). The hotel-casino operated a nightclub, featuring the Meadows Revue and the Meadow Larks band. It also had a landing strip for small airplanes.

== History ==
In early 1931, Nevada governor Fred B. Balzar signed into law Assembly Bill 98, which legalized gambling, and the Meadows was one of the first casinos to open after legalization. The Meadows was owned by Frank and Louis Stralla and opened on May 2, 1931. They sold the hotel in July 1931 to Alex Richmond. In September 1931, a fire broke out at the hotel and because it was outside the Las Vegas city limits, the Las Vegas city fire department refused to fight the fire.

The casino was leased in 1932 to Guido Marchetti, Frank Miller and Earl West. Then, in 1935, the property was sold to Dave Stearns, Sam Stearns and Larry Potter. The Meadows later became a house of prostitution, operated by Eddie Clippinger. The Meadows was closed down in 1942 by the federal government under provisions of the May Act, as it was near Las Vegas Army Airfield. It later caught on fire and was demolished.

== Afterward ==
Tony Cornero later owned the gambling ships SS Rex and SS Tango, in the late 1930s, and SS Lux, in 1946, operating off the coast of Southern California. All three ships were eventually shut down by the government. In 1945, Cornero also briefly owned the S.S. Rex Club on the ground floor of the Apache Hotel in Downtown Las Vegas (now the site of Binion's Gambling Hall and Hotel). He was developing the Stardust Resort and Casino when he died in 1955 while playing craps at the Desert Inn.

Eddie Clippinger and his wife, Roxie Clippinger, later operated Roxie's, a well known bordello in the Formyle (originally Four Mile) section of Las Vegas on the Boulder Highway. In 1954, the federal government shut it down. The Las Vegas Sun newspaper reported on the political corruption surrounding the operation of Roxies. Glen Jones, the Sheriff of Clark County, filed a $1 million libel lawsuit against Las Vegas Sun owner Hank Greenspun, but later withdrew the lawsuit. In a reelection bid that year, Jones finished last in a field of five candidates and lost the office he had held for 12 years.
