= Sam Rummel =

American attorney and murder victim (1906–1950)

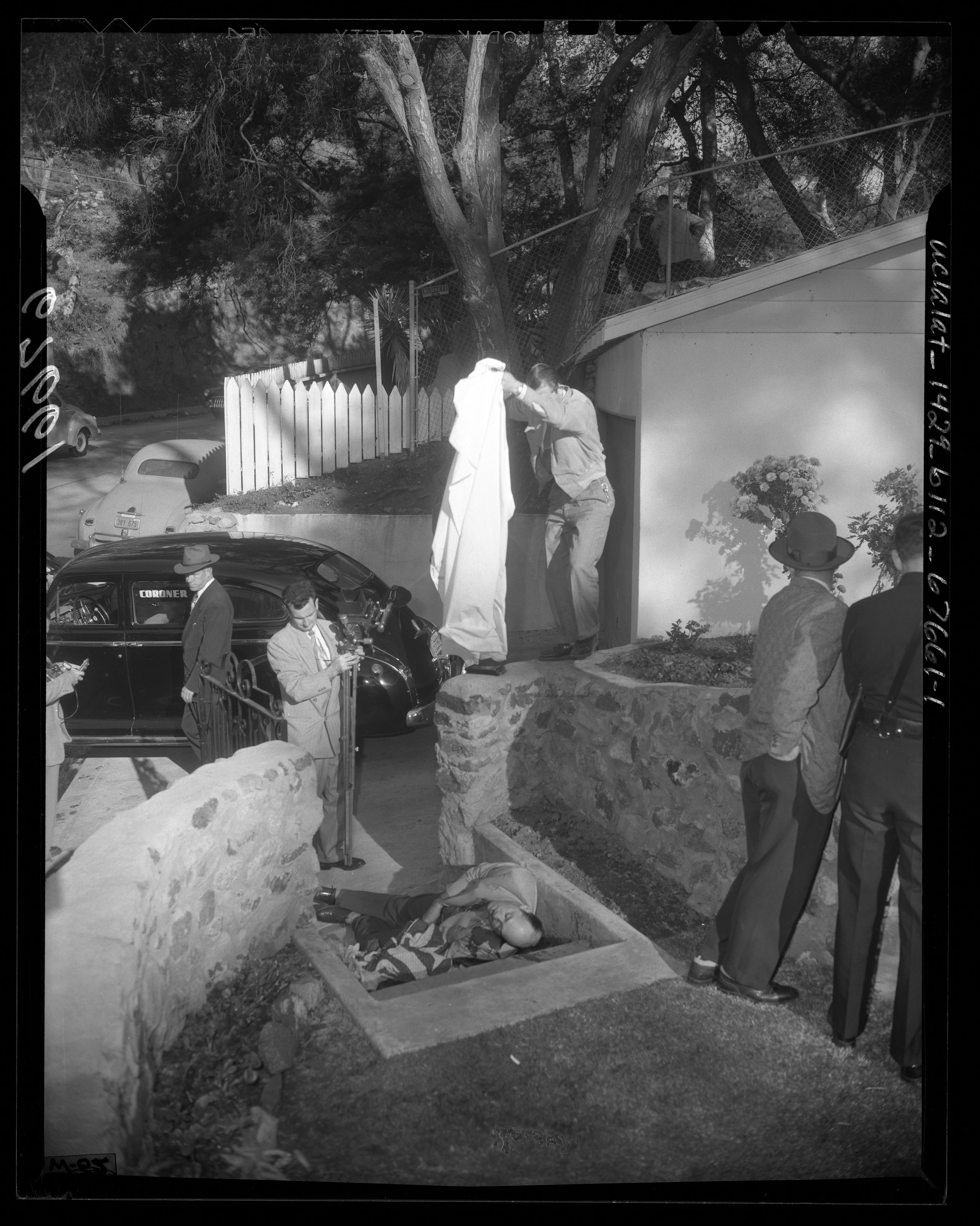
- Police photographing body of Sam Rummel at scene of death, 1950 (Los Angeles Times photo collection via UCLA Digital)
- Born: May 26, 1906; Kansas City, Missouri, United States
- Died: December 11, 1950 (aged 44); Los Angeles, California, U.S.

Samuel Louis Rummel (May 26, 1906 – December 11, 1950) was an American attorney and murder victim. Rummel's clients included Gardena, California poker clubs, gambling ship operator Tony Cornero, and reputed mobster and convicted income-tax evader Mickey Cohen. A shotgun blast killed Rummel outside his home in Laurel Canyon in 1950. No one was ever charged with Rummel's murder but a 2021 history of the Los Angeles underworld states that Rummel was killed on orders from Jack Dragna.

== Career ==
One history of law enforcement in California in the Earl Warren era described Rummel as "a smart, able lawyer, but had devoted his life and efforts to defending people in the underworld". Rummel represented the owners of Gardena, California-based casinos in "their frequent court battles, and had won a key appeals court decision in 1941 that struck down a challenge to the clubs". Rummel owned 15 percent of the Monterey poker club in Gardena. He had also represented Tony Cornero, who ran gambling ships off the Pacific coast during the Great Depression.

In 1955, when unidentified gunmen shot up the home of "Bingo King" Max Kleiger in Pacific Palisades, the Los Angeles Mirror reported, "The beach front gambler's name popped up in Kefauver committee testimony here a few years ago in connection with an alleged plot to recall then Mayor Bowron so that open gambling could run in the city. The committee reportedly received evidence of a meeting of five powerful syndicate figures in a Hollywood hotel room." The five people in the meeting were reportedly Bob Gans, Max Kleiger, Jimmy "the Eel" Utley, Curly Robinson, and Sammy Rummel. Gans was the town's one-time "slot-machine king," Robinson was the town's "pinball-machine king," Kleiger was a bookie, Utley "concentrated on bingo and abortion," and Sammy Rummel was Mickey Cohen's lawyer.

Rummel, as part of a "stellar legal team", is credited as one of the reasons for Mickey Cohen's rise to power. One biography of Cohen suggests that the relationship between the two had substantially cooled at the time of Rummel's murder in 1950.

== Murder ==
Rummel was shot in the back from about ten yards distance around 1:30 a.m. on December 12, 1950, on the walkway to his home in Laurel Canyon in Los Angeles, California, United States, by someone wielding a double-barreled shotgun. The killing occurred the morning before Rummel was scheduled to testify before a grand jury in the matter of Guarantee Finance, described as a "massive bookmaking-loan syndicate that operated in county territory until it was shut down by state authorities in early 1949". Mickey Cohen attended Rummel's funeral, in company with his bodyguards Dominic "Highpockets" Faranacci and Sam Farkas. No charges were ever filed in the case of Rummel's murder.

According to a history of the Los Angeles Police Department, "The assassination took place just one day before the County Grand Jury was to open its investigation of connections between county law officers and a large bookmaking ring. It was obvious the ring was determined to survive at all costs and no one was immune. Its involvement in local law enforcement agencies was frightening. Two former Sheriffs Department employees, a captain and sergeant, had been suspended and were indicted for their alleged involvement in taking bribes and failing to enforce gambling laws. Both had been talking to Rummel shortly before his death." A Congressional investigation into organized crime suggested the owners of the Horseshoe Club, a rival Gardena poker outfit to Rummel's Monterey, may have had an interest in his death.

LAPD Chief of Police William H. Parker suspected Jimmy "the Weasel" Fratianno, but prosecutors deemed evidence too weak for an arrest. According to the authors of Los Angeles Underworld (2021), two associates of Los Angeles boss Jack Dragna were responsible for the killing: "Angelo Polizzi squeezed the trigger, and Nick Licata's son Carlo assisted on the hit. The pair became made mafia members a year later, and Polizzi eventually rose to caporegime."
