= Gandier ordinance =

Alcohol prohibition in Los Angeles, California

The Gandier ordinance was the local alcohol-prohibition ordinance in the city of Los Angeles, California, United States, passed in November 1917 and effective April 1918. The Gandier ordinance pre-dated the statewide Wright Act of 1922 and national prohibition in the United States. Under the Gandier ordinance it was illegal to sell beverages with higher than 0.5% alcohol, but "pharmacists might fill prescriptions for alcoholic liquors in a quantity not to exceed one-half pint (eight ounces) upon a single prescrip-tion. There was no limitation in the ordinance with reference to the frequency with which prescriptions might be issued." Liquor remained legal until 1919 in "wet" enclaves like Venice, then an independent city, and Vernon, an "industrial suburb" of downtown Los Angeles and also an independent municipality. L.A.'s city-wide prohibition law was repealed by referendum in May 1933. The Gandier ordinance was named for Daniel McGillivray Gandier, a leader of the California Anti-Saloon League.
