= Kesher Zion =

- Location in Pennsylvania

Religion
- Affiliation: Conservative Judaism
- Ecclesiastical or organizational status: Synagogue
- Leadership: Rabbi David B. Sislen
- Status: Active

Location
- Location: 555 Warwick Drive, Wyomissing, Reading, Pennsylvania 19610
- Country: United States
- Interactive map of Kesher Zion
- Coordinates: 40°20′00″N 75°54′47″W

Architecture
- Established: 1929 (as a congregation)

Website
- www.kesherzion.org

Kesher Zion is a Conservative Jewish congregation and synagogue located 555 Warwick Drive, Wyomissing in Reading, Pennsylvania, in the United States.

Congregations B'nai Zion and Kesher Israel merged to form Kesher Zion in 1929.

In April 1978, vandals painted seven swastikas on the walls, doors, and columns of the synagogue.
