= Guy McAfee =

American businessman (1888–1960)

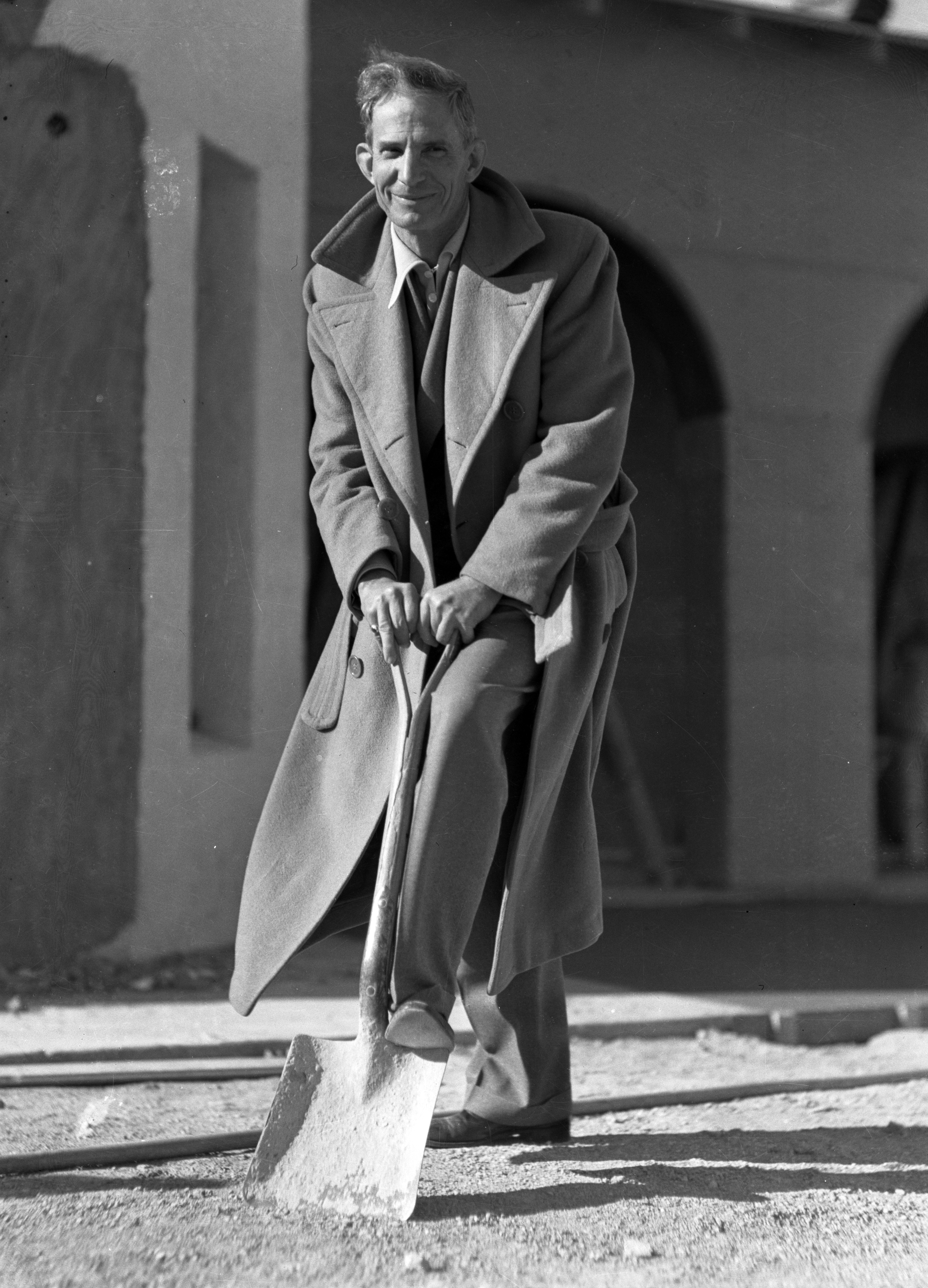
- Guy McAfee in 1939
- Born: August 19, 1888; Winfield, Kansas, U.S.
- Died: February 20, 1960 (aged 71); Las Vegas, Nevada, U.S.
- Occupation(s): Policeman, businessman
- Spouse: 3, including June Brewster
- Children: 2 daughters

Guy Alexander McAfee (August 19, 1888 – February 20, 1960) was an American law enforcement officer and businessman. Born in Kansas and orphaned in early childhood, he became a firefighter in Los Angeles, California, and later served as the head of the vice squad of the Los Angeles Police Department. He was the owner of brothels and gambling saloons, with ties to organized crime in the 1930s. He co-founded casinos in Las Vegas, Nevada, in the 1940s and 1950s. He is credited as the first person to refer to Las Vegas Boulevard as the Las Vegas Strip, after Los Angeles's Sunset Strip.

== Early life ==
Guy McAfee was born on August 19, 1888, in Winfield, Kansas. He became an orphan in childhood. He was described as a "thin, wing-earred, likable chap, who had come to Los Angeles from the wheat belt".

== Career ==
McAfee began his career as a firefighter in Los Angeles, California. He subsequently served as the head of the vice squad of the Los Angeles Police Department. At the same time, he was the owner of gambling "saloons and brothels and had ties to organized crime." He was also the manager of the Clover Club, an upmarket club on the Sunset Strip. His nicknames were "Slats," for his height and build, and "the Whistler," because when he was on what was then called the purity squad, he would warn vice dens by calling them up and whistling a certain tune while feigning for his police compatriots that there was no answer. Reformers called him the "Capone of LA". His associates included Charlie Crawford, slot-machine king Bob Gans, political fixer Kent Parrot, Zeke Caress, Tutor Scherer, Farmer Page, Charles Cradick, Chuck Addison, and Tony Cornero. When Judge Fletcher Bowron was elected as the 38th Mayor of Los Angeles on a platform to rid Los Angeles of prostitution, gambling and narcotics in 1938, McAfee moved to Las Vegas, Nevada, within a year.

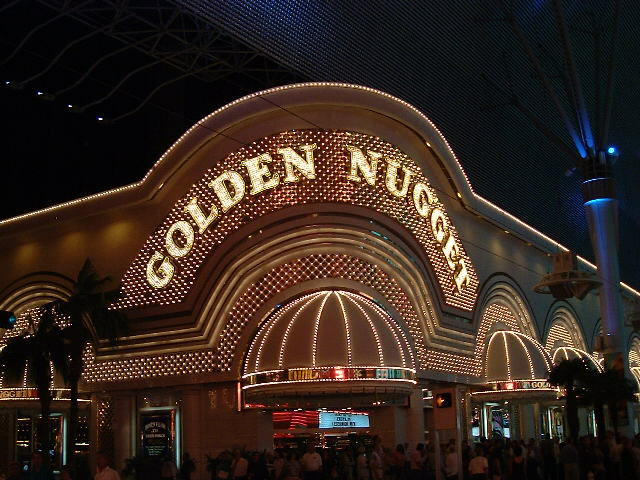
The Golden Nugget in Las Vegas, Nevada.

In 1939, McAfee acquired the Pair O'Dice Club on Highway 91 (the future Las Vegas Boulevard) and renamed it the 91 Club, and the Frontier Club, downtown Las Vegas. Meanwhile, with Milton B. Page, McAfee managed the El Rancho, another casino. He was a co-founder of the Pioneer Club in 1942. Three years later he announced plans to build the Golden Nugget, downtown Las Vegas, which opened in 1946. McAfee was president of Golden Nugget from 1952 until his retirement in 1960.

McAfee was also a real estate investor in California. For example, he was the co-proprietor of the Chapman Building in Fullerton, California, alongside N. Morty Bernstein in 1949, which he leased to the American Red Cross.

With Jake Kozloff and Beldon Katleman, McAfee acquired the Frontier Hotel on the Las Vegas Strip in 1951. They acquired it from Bill Moore for US$5.5 million.

McAfee named the Las Vegas Strip in Las Vegas after the Sunset Strip in Los Angeles.

McAfee was a co-founder of the unincorporated place of Paradise, Nevada, near Las Vegas. It was established as a tax shelter for casinos.

== Personal life ==
McAfee resided at the Biltmore Hotel, a luxury hotel in Downtown Los Angeles. He was married three times. With his first wife Eva, he had a daughter, Alice. He married his second wife, June Brewster, in 1936. She filed for divorce in 1941. His third wife, Kathleen, was the owner of a brothel in Los Angeles. He adopted her daughter, Kathleen Elizabeth McAfee. They resided in Beverly Hills, California. In 1950, their house burned down; the fire was not deemed suspicious.

== Death ==
McAfee died in January 1960 after a surgery at the Sunrise Hospital & Medical Center. He was 71.
