= June Brewster =

American actress (1913–1995)

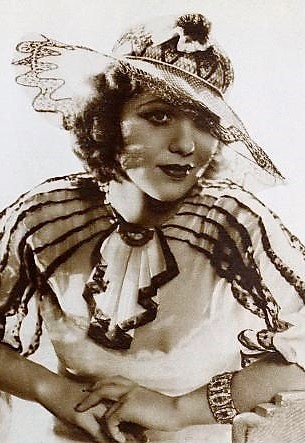
- Brewster in Cine-Mundial, 1934
- Born: Kathleen Anderson; August 8, 1913; New York City, U.S.
- Died: November 2, 1995 (aged 82); Las Vegas, Nevada, U.S.
- Occupation: Actress
- Years active: 1932–1938
- Spouse: Guy McAfee

June Brewster (born Kathleen Anderson; August 8, 1913 – November 2, 1995) was an American film actress of the 1930s.

When Brewster was young she took lessons in piano, violin, and voice from three cousins.

On Broadway, Brewster performed in the 1930 version of The Earl Carroll Vanities.

== Selected filmography ==
- The Sport Parade (1932)
- Goldie Gets Along (1933)
- Meet the Baron (1933)
- Headline Shooter (1933)
- Flying Devils (1933)
- Hips, Hips, Hooray! (1934)
- Melody Cruise (1933)
- The Case Against Mrs. Ames (1936)
- Partners in Crime (1937)
- Blonde Trouble (1937)
- The Lady Escapes (1937)
- Love Is a Headache (1938)
- Thanks for the Memory (1938)
