= Zeke Caress =

American bookmaker (1884–1968)

Ezekiel Logan "Zeke" Caress (1884–1968) was an American bookmaker. He worked in Mexico at the Agua Caliente race track and at Santa Anita in California. He bought Jim Jeffries' saloon at 326 S. Spring Street in downtown Los Angeles in 1917, and the building became something like a central headquarters for the Los Angeles organized crime organization run by Guy McAfee that was known as the Syndicate. Caress was sometimes called the "king of the bookies". He handled off-track betting for clients, including reportedly actors of the Los Angeles film industry, and according to Time magazine in 1935 readily took bets of US$25,000 (equivalent to $573,362 in 2024).

== See also ==
- Betting on horse racing
- Gambling in California
