= Anthony Cornero =

American bootlegger and gambling entrepreneur (1899–1955)

Anthony Cornero Stralla
- Born: August 18, 1899; Lequio Tanaro, Piedmont, Kingdom of Italy
- Died: July 31, 1955 (aged 55); Paradise, Nevada

Anthony Cornero Stralla also known as "the Admiral" and "Tony the Hat" (August 18, 1899 – July 31, 1955) was a bootlegger and gambling entrepreneur in Southern California from the 1920s through the 1950s. During his varied career, he bootlegged liquor into Los Angeles, ran legal gambling ships in international waters, and legally operated casinos in Las Vegas, Nevada.

== Life and career ==
=== Early life ===
Antonio Cornero was born in Lequio Tanaro, Province of Cuneo, in the Piedmont region of Northern Italy. Cornero and his family immigrated to the United States after his father lost the farm in a card game and a fire destroyed their harvest. Cornero's father died a few years later and his mother married Luigi Stralla, a former suitor from Italy. After their arrival in San Francisco, Cornero used the aliases Tony Cornero and Tony Stralla as he signed on to merchant ships bound for the Far East.

=== Prohibition ===
In 1923, with Prohibition in effect, Cornero became a rum-runner. His clientele included many high-class customers and night clubs.

Using a shrimping business as a cover, Cornero started smuggling Canadian whiskey into Southern California with his small fleet of freighters. One of Cornero's ships, Lily, could carry up to 4,000 cases of bootleg liquor in each trip. Cornero would unload the liquor beyond the three-mile limit into his speedboats, which would bring it to the Southern California beaches. His fleet easily evaded the understaffed and ill-equipped US Coast Guard. By the time Cornero turned 25, he had become a millionaire.

However, in 1926, the law caught up with Cornero. Returning from Guaymas, Mexico, with an estimated 1,000 cases of rum, he was intercepted and arrested. Sentenced to two years imprisonment, he jokingly told reporters he'd only purchased the illegal cargo "to keep 120 million people from being poisoned to death". While being taken by rail to prison, Cornero escaped from his guards and jumped off the train. Cornero boarded a ship for Vancouver, British Columbia, Canada and fled the US. Eventually reaching Europe, he spent several years there in hiding. In 1929, he returned to Los Angeles and turned himself in.

In 1931, shortly after his release from prison, Cornero established the Ken Tar Insulation Company. However, federal authorities soon discovered it was a cover for a large scale bootlegging operation and raided it. Cornero then moved his operations to a location in Culver City, California. Soon he was producing up to 5,000 gallons of alcohol a day. Federal authorities raided the Culver City site, but found no evidence of bootlegging; Cornero was probably warned ahead of time.

=== Las Vegas – The Meadows ===
While Cornero was in prison in 1931, his brothers Louis and Frank opened The Meadows Casino & Hotel in Las Vegas. The Meadows opened May 2, 1931, only five weeks after legalized gambling in Nevada, on desert land outside off Boulder Hwy right outside the Las Vegas city limits. It is considered the earliest resort in Las Vegas, its first "the first carpet joint," and the beginning of Las Vegas casino entertainment, 10 years before El Rancho Vegas and 15 ahead of The Flamingo. There is no evidence that Tony Cornero was directly involved in opening, ownership, operations, or ever visited The Meadows, however his name is linked to the resort through involvement of his brothers. Because of Tony Cornero's notoriety, according to one detailed account, “People wanted to hear that Tony Cornero built The Meadows hotel and casino.” Tony Cornero later opened and briefly operated a casino in downtown Las Vegas called SS Rex from March to June 1945.

=== Floating casinos ===
In 1936, Cornero decided to open a shipboard gaming operation off the Southern California coast. By sailing in international waters, Cornero hoped to legally run his gambling dens without interference from US authorities.

Cornero purchased two large ships and converted them into luxury casinos at a cost of $300,000. He named the ships Rex and Tango. Cornero's premier cruise ship was Rex, which could accommodate over 2,000 gamblers. It carried a crew of 350, including waiters and waitresses, gourmet chefs, a full orchestra, and a squad of gunmen. Its first class dining room served French cuisine exclusively.

The two ships were anchored outside the "three mile limit" off Santa Monica and Long Beach. The wealthy of Los Angeles would take water taxis out to the ships to enjoy the gambling, shows, and restaurants.

In October 1939, Los Angeles Zoo was facing a financial crisis. Cornero offered the zoo a day's proceeds from Rex. Considering that his ships were earning $300,000 a cruise, this was no idle gesture. Although zoo officials seriously considered the offer, pressure from state politicians forced them to decline it.

=== The end of the fleet ===
The success of Cornero's floating casinos brought outrage from California officials. State Attorney General Earl Warren ordered a series of raids against his gambling ships.

On May 4, 1946, after Warren became Governor of California, he publicly stated his intention to shut down gambling ships outside California waters. He said he intended "to call the Navy and Coast Guard if necessary." During his address, Warren specifically denounced the newly-converted gambling ship Lux owned by "Admiral" Tony Cornero. Warren stated "It's an outrage that lumber should be used for such a gambling ship, when veterans can't get lumber with which to build their homes."

Despite battles with authorities over the legality of their entering international waters, the State of California found a way to circumvent the three mile limit. The state refigured the starting point of the three mile limit off the coastline and determined the ships were indeed in California waters. Without wasting any time, police boarded several Coast Guard cutters and sailed out to Cornero's ships to close them down and arrest Cornero. However, when the police reached the ships, Cornero would not let them board. Reportedly, Cornero turned the ship's fire hoses on the police when they attempted to board and declared they were committing "piracy on the high seas". A stand-off ensued for eight days before Cornero finally surrendered.

Cornero eventually closed his floating casinos. He later tried to reopen land-based illegal casinos in Los Angeles, but was thwarted by mobster Mickey Cohen. Instead, Cornero returned to Las Vegas.

=== Murder attempt ===
In Las Vegas, Cornero contacted his friend Orlando Silvagni, owner of the Apache Hotel. Cornero made a deal with Silvagni to lease the hotel casino and rename it the "SS Rex" (after his former floating casino in California). The Las Vegas City Council, aware of Cornero's history with the Green Meadows casino and his floating casinos, voted "no" on approving his gambling license. However, one councilman then changed his vote, the motion passed, and Cornero got his license. However, in a later vote, the Council revoked Cornero's gambling license, and he then closed the SS Rex.

Cornero and his wife left Las Vegas and moved back to Beverly Hills, California. Cornero made plans to invest in Baja California in Mexico. On February 9, 1948, two Mexican men came to Cornero's home in Beverly Hills. When Cornero answered the door, one man gave Cornero a carton and said, "here, Cornero – this is for you" and shot him four times in the stomach. Gravely wounded, Cornero underwent surgery that night and managed to survive the shooting.

=== The Stardust Resort and Casino ===
As soon as Cornero recovered from his wounds, he returned to Vegas to build a new hotel and casino, the Stardust Resort & Casino. He bought a 40-acre (16 ha) piece of land on the Las Vegas Strip and filed an application with the United States Securities and Exchange Commission (SEC) to sell stock in the hotel corporation. When the stock was issued, Cornero bought 65,000 shares for 10 cents apiece, giving him majority control of the corporation at 51% of all stock. Cornero then sold the remaining shares. Finally, he applied to the Nevada Gaming Commission for his gaming license and was turned down. The Commission rejected Cornero's application because of an old bootlegging conviction and the trouble that Cornero was having with the SEC. This rejection meant Cornero had invested his money in a half-built casino that he was not allowed to operate.

Not to be stopped, Cornero came up with a new plan. He asked his friend Milton B. "Farmer" Page, another Las Vegas casino owner, to take over the project. Page agreed on the condition that he be able to run it. In 1955, Cornero made the first of several presentations seeking loans from Moe Dalitz, owner of the Desert Inn hotel and casino, and Dalitz' partner, New York mobster Meyer Lansky. Dalitz decided to initially loan Cornero $1.25 million. This loan was followed by a second and third loan, with Cornero using the unfinished Stardust Hotel as loan collateral. Loans with United Hotels were then nearly $4.3 million. Despite these cash infusions, Cornero ran out of money again as the hotel construction was finishing.

=== Suspicious death ===
On July 31, 1955, Cornero told an investors' meeting in Las Vegas, "we need another $800,000 to stock the casino with cash and pay the liquor and food suppliers". Later that day, Cornero was playing craps in the Desert Inn Casino. Suddenly, he fell to the floor and died.

Rumors soon arose that someone had poisoned Cornero's drink. The rumors gained credence when Cornero's body was removed from the casino floor before anyone contacted the Clark County Coroner or the Clark County Sheriff's Department. Cornero's drinking glass was taken and washed; sheriff's deputies never had the chance to examine it. No autopsy was performed and a coroner's jury in Los Angeles determined that he died of a heart attack.

=== Aftermath ===
Cornero was buried at Inglewood Park Cemetery in Inglewood, California. In 1958, the Stardust Resort and Casino finally opened and became the largest hotel in the world. The Stardust would remain a huge success until its demolition by implosion in 2007. Cornero is also credited with the lucrative concept of putting slot machines in the hotel lobby to lure guests as they passed by.

== In popular culture ==
- The 1940 novel Farewell, My Lovely by Raymond Chandler, portrayed gambling ships stationed off the Southern California coast, run by a sophisticated gangster similar to Cornero. The story was adapted for the screen in 1942 as The Falcon Takes Over, in 1944 as Murder, My Sweet (also known in the UK as Farewell, My Lovely), and in 1975 as Farewell, My Lovely
- The 1940 film Gambling on the High Seas was set in part aboard a gambling ship, the SS Sylvania.
- In the 1943 film Mr. Lucky, Cary Grant portrayed "Joe 'The Greek' Adams", a character loosely based on Cornero. The story-line carried over to episodes of the 1959–1960 CBS US TV series of the same name.
