= Michael Rizzitello =

Canadian-American mobster (1927–2005)

- Mug shot of Rizzitello in 1983
- Born: Michael Anthony Rizzitello; March 29, 1927; Montreal, Quebec, Canada
- Died: October 26, 2005 (aged 78); Palm Springs, California, U.S.
- Resting place: Forest Lawn Cemetery, Cathedral City, California
- Other name: Mike Rizzi
- Occupation: Mobster
- Allegiance: Los Angeles crime family
- Conviction: Conspiracy to commit murder
- Penalty: 33 years imprisonment (1990)

Michael Anthony Rizzitello (March 29, 1927 – October 26, 2005), also known as "Mike Rizzi", was a Canadian-American mobster and high-ranking member of the Los Angeles crime family. Rizzitello's criminal record stretched back to 1947. He was also featured in several biography novels by mobsters-turned-informants Jimmy Fratianno (The Last Mafioso and Vengeance Is Mine), Anthony Fiato (The Animal in Hollywood), and Kenny Gallo (Breakshot).

== Early life ==
Rizzitello was born in Montreal, Quebec, Canada on March 29, 1927. He later moved to New York City and as an adult became associated with organized crime. He worked for "Crazy Joe" Gallo in the 1950s who was a member of the Profaci crime family (later named the Colombo crime family). When Gallo attempted to take over the Profaci crime family, Rizzitello was one of his key gunmen. Rizzitello allegedly participated in the murder of mobster John Guariglia and Paul Ricci at the HiFi Lounge in Brooklyn on November 11, 1961, along with future Los Angeles crime family soldier Tommy Ricciardi. Soon in 1956, Mike Rizzitello moved to California. In California, Rizzitello first became affiliated with the Los Angeles Mafia working as a debt collector and extortionist for Salvatore "Dago Louie" Piscopo along with a friend of his named Louie "Lefty" Castiglione. He was also mentored by Joseph Sica; an associate of Piscopo.

== Los Angeles ==
In 1962, Rizzitello was arrested by the LAPD for a string of armed robberies of restaurants and businesses in the Hollywood area, and after conviction he served nine years in prison. In 1970, Rizzitello met inmate William Carroll in prison at Chino prison. The two men became quick friends. In the mid 80's Carroll would become the manager of the Mustang Club, a well-known exotic dance club in Santa Ana that Rizzitello received "protection" money from. Carroll later testified in court the protection amount was $5,000 per week. Allegedly, he became associated with Joe "Pegleg" Morgan and Rodolfo Cadena, two members of the Mexican Mafia while in prison. During his time in Los Angeles, Rizzitello also became associated with the Los Angeles crime family. He became involved in illegal gambling, loan sharking, mail fraud, insurance fraud, and extortion. After working extensively with the L.A. Mob, On June 6, 1976, Louie Piscopo allegedly sponsored Rizzitello to become a made man. Attending the ceremony were, consigliere Frank Bompensiero, acting boss Aladena "Jimmy the Weasel" Fratianno and co-acting boss Louis Tom Dragna. Later in 1976, he was arrested and convicted of insurance fraud and was subsequently arrested and acquitted of strong-arming an acquaintance over a gambling debt. In 1977, he was arrested in a mail-billing scheme and convicted. He was sentenced to three years for the two convictions. Rizzitello quickly moved up in the L.A. family and was promoted to caporegime by acting boss Jimmy Fratianno a year later, in 1977.

In 1977, Rizzitello was charged with extortion and filing a false insurance claim. Rizzitello pleaded no contest on May 2, 1977 to one count of insurance fraud. A second grand theft charge was dismissed. On May 22, 1977 he was sentenced to serve 2 to 3 years in state prison, but was allowed to remain free after a $20,000 bond was secured. Rizzitello had quickly become well respected, and was a large cash earner for the L.A. family. In 1977, the Chicago Outfit sent Rizzitello to pressure casino owner Moe Dalitz into giving the Outfit $1,000,000. However, the FBI was tipped off by new informant Jimmy Fratianno, and they intervened in the extortion incident. In 1978 mob boss Dominic Brooklier had tried to get Rizzitello to set up the murder of Jimmy Fratianno. Fratianno later turned state's evidence and testified against many of his fellow mobsters. Rizzitello was later put on trial for conspiring with Fratianno to attempt to kill a government witness for Pennsylvania crime boss Russell Bufalino, but was acquitted.

In November 1980, Rizzitello was convicted of racketeering and extortion, and sentenced two months later to five years in prison. He was released from prison in 1986, he was put on trial again on charges that he and others tried to defraud a Montana firm in a fraudulent transfer of stock. He was acquitted. In 1987, he was put on trial again; this time charged with trying to market $1 million in stolen bonds. For the third straight time he was acquitted, using attorney Anthony Brooklier, the son of L.A. Mafia boss Dominic Brooklier, as his attorney. Jimmy Fratianno wrote extensively about his working relationship and friendship with Rizzitello in his best-selling book about the Los Angeles mob, The Last Mafioso.

When Rizzitello was released from prison in early 1986, Peter Milano had become the new boss of the Los Angeles crime family. While Milano and Rizzitello had worked together in the 1970s, they now had a distant relationship. Rizzitello then went to the Gambino crime family in New York City to seek permission to start his own crime family in California, but it never came to be. However, he was able to run an independent crew under Milano's family. Rizzitello worked closely with and mob mentored Anthony Fiato in the 1980s, before Fiato secretly decided to cooperate with the FBI. In 1988, Rizzitello was blacklisted from every casino in Las Vegas due to his involvement in crime and specifically illegal gambling in the city.

== Conspiracy to commit murder ==
On May 1, 1987, Rizzitello and Joey Grosso attacked William Carroll, the chief financier for the Mustang Club in Santa Ana, over an extorted money dispute. In an empty parking garage in Costa Mesa, Carroll survived three shots to the back of his head, which left him permanently blind. A month later, Rizzitello was returned to federal prison for a parole violation—associating with known criminals. In October 1988, Carroll named Rizzitello and Grosso as his attackers.

Defended again by attorney Anthony Brooklier, Rizzitello was sentenced on April 20, 1990, to a total of 33 years in prison: 25 years for conspiracy to commit first-degree murder, three years for great bodily injury to Carroll, two years for use of a firearm, and three more because Rizzitello was a convicted felon with a firearm.

Terminally ill, Rizzitello died of complications of cancer at the age of 78, on October 26, 2005, in Palm Springs, California. He was still in custody at the time of his death. Rizzitello was interred at Forest Lawn Cemetery in Cathedral City, California.
