= Dragna =

Dragna is an Italian surname and may refer to:

- Jack Dragna (1891–1956), Los Angeles crime family mobster
- Louis Tom Dragna (1920–2012), Los Angeles mobster and Jack's nephew
- Tom Dragna (1889–1977), Los Angeles mobster, father of Louis, brother of Jack
