= The Last Mafioso =

1980 biographical novel by Ovid Demaris

- Hardcover edition
- Author: Ovid Demaris
- Language: English
- Subject: Organized crime, gambling
- Genre: Biography novel
- Publisher: Crown Publishing
- Publication date: January 13, 1980
- Publication place: United States
- Media type: Print
- Pages: 463 pp.
- ISBN: 0812909550

The Last Mafioso: The Treacherous World of Jimmy Fratianno is a biographical novel detailing the life of American Mafia member Aladena "Jimmy the Weasel" Fratianno. It chronicles Fratianno's life from his childhood in Cleveland to becoming acting boss of the Los Angeles crime family. Author Ovid Demaris gained the information for the book from Fratianno himself in the early 1980s, where they spent hours recording the pair's conversations. Demaris also conducted his own research. The book was released on January 13, 1980 by Crown Publishing. It was the first of two biographical books written about Fratianno; the other is Vengeance is Mine (1987) by Michael J. Zuckerman.

== Overview ==
The book begins in 1947 with Jimmy Fratianno becoming a made man in the Los Angeles crime family, then headed by Jack Dragna. It then goes back to Fratianno's early childhood, growing up in Cleveland, Ohio in the 1920s and 1930s. The book then generally follows a chronological timeline of Fratianno's life up to 1978, when under the threat of death, Fratianno decided to turn against his crime family and become an FBI government witness. Events covered include his three prison stints, two failed marriages, numerous girlfriends, five murders, working for the Chicago Outfit, running a successful trucking company, and attempts at buying into a Las Vegas casino.

The book is a revealing tale of life in the Mafia. It gave an in depth look at the Los Angeles crime family, The Chicago Outfit, and The Cleveland crime family. Amongst the notable mobsters prominently featured are Jack Dragna, Mickey Cohen, John Roselli, Sam Giancana, Frank Bompensiero, Louis Tom Dragna, Dominic Brooklier, Michael Rizzitello, Frank Tieri and Peter Milano. With dozens of Mafiosi and their connections featured in the book, it quickly became an important source of the Mafia's history and workings. Notable non-mobsters featured are Frank Sinatra, Dean Martin and Joseph Alioto.

Being a close associate and friend of Fratianno, Johnny Roselli's life is also detailed (he is one of the few mobsters Fratianno speaks highly of, the others being Mike Rizzitello and Leo "Lips" Moceri). The book describes conversations the two had about Roselli's involvement in the CIA's plot to assassinate Fidel Castro. Details were revealed over 25 years before the plot, known as "Family Jewels", became declassified in 2007. The book also mentions Roselli's alleged involvement in the John F. Kennedy assassination, but dismisses the notion that the Mafia had anything to do with the murder.

== Errors ==
This book, while comprehensive, has a few factual inaccuracies. It states several times that Jack Dragna died in 1957 when he actually died on February 23, 1956. The book also describes casino owner Mert Wertheimer as being murdered in Reno, Nevada, when he actually died of leukemia.
