= Rosario Gambino =

Member of the Sicilian Mafia

- Born: Rosario Gambino; January 12, 1942 (age 84); Palermo, Sicily, Italy
- Other name: Sal
- Relatives: John Gambino (brother); Joseph Gambino (brother); Frank Cali (nephew)
- Allegiance: Gambino Crime Family
- Conviction: Drug trafficking (1984)
- Penalty: 45 years

Rosario "Sal" Gambino (Italian pronunciation: [roˈzaːrjo ɡamˈbiːno]; born January 12, 1942) is an Italian mobster in the Gambino crime family. He became nationally known when he and his brothers set up a multimillion dollar heroin cartel during the 1970s and 1980s. At the turn of the century he made headline news again when members of his family were suspected of trying to get him a presidential pardon through bribery.

== Family ==
Rosario Gambino was born as the middle son of Tommaso Gambino in Palermo in Sicily on January 12, 1942. Along with his two brothers Giuseppe (Joseph) and Giovanni (John), he became a made man of the Sicilian Mafia. They are distant relatives of Carlo Gambino and his son Thomas Gambino. The family moved to the United States in 1962. After moving, Gambino started his own family and had four children. Both of his sons, Anthony and Tommaso have been suspected of being mobsters. After Rosario's imprisonment in Los Angeles, his children moved to Los Angeles and ran a record company and a pay phone installation company.

The Gambinos also were closely related to the Spatola, Inzerillo, and Di Maggio Mafia families in Sicily. All these families worked closely together to form a trans-Atlantic heroin smuggling operation:

"the Gambino brothers are cousins of the Spatola brothers Rosario, Vincenzo and Antonio, their father, Salvatore, being brother to the Gambino's mother; that Giuseppe Inzerillo married Giuseppa Di Maggio-sister of Calogero, Giuseppe and Salvatore Di Maggio- while Calogero Di Maggio married Dominica Spatola, thus strengthening the kinship between these families."

== Move to New Jersey ==
The Gambino family eventually made their way to New Jersey. Although they entered the country illegally in 1962, they were granted permanent residency in 1966. The brothers later joined the Gambino crime family and were made members of the criminal organization in 1975 by Paul Castellano, who is also a distant relative. Older brother Giovanni (who Americanized his name to John) was named a caporegime (captain) in the crime family and Rosario and Giuseppe (who Americanized his name to Joseph) were his top lieutenants. Together the brothers formed a crew known as the "Cherry Hill Gambinos", named after their city of operation, Cherry Hill, New Jersey.

Together Rosario and Joseph ran a chain of restaurants called "Father and Son Pizza". They also ran pizza shops in Philadelphia and Camden, and, with a cousin, pizzerias as far south as Dover, Delaware. The two brothers were also suspects in a string of arsons in the 1980s. Despite his considerable earnings, Rosario reported little money on his income tax return. Rosario Gambino owned Sals pizza in Delran, New Jersey. Although no longer there, it's where he met with his underlings now and again wearing suits that made him a stand alone presence. According to government reports:

"one finds a financial picture which is simply not credible. His own attorney was unable to identify his occupation when asked to do so by the court. During the last few years, he has reported moderate amounts of income, approximately $20,000 in his 1982 U. S. Individual Income Tax Return and approximately $21,000 in his 1983 Income Tax Return. Yet he lives in a lavish home which is insured for $150,000 and for which he makes mortgage payments of $1,087.00 each month. Moreover, during the calendar year 1983, he made deposits totaling just under $35,000 in his checking account. He testified that he was unemployed from December 31, 1983, until his arrest on March 16, 1984. Although he allegedly had no source of income, he stated he left untouched the $20,000 in cash he had accumulated from his pizzeria. Still he was able to meet his living expenses, gamble in the casinos and pay $1,697.00 in cash to have fountain lights installed in front of his house during this time period."

In 1983, Louis Eppolito – a former New York Police Department (NYPD) detective who worked on behalf of the New York Mafia – was suspected in a corruption case that he had provided NYPD intelligence reports on to Rosario. Rosario was also linked to the Pizza Connection probe, where dealers would sell drugs from pizzerias.

== Heroin trafficking and conviction ==
Despite an official ban on drug dealing by the American Mafia, the Italian Gambino brothers were heavily involved in international heroin trafficking out of Bensonhurst. The Cherry Hill Gambinos were the ultimate recipients of the heroin that was brought in by the Inzerillo-Gambino-Spatola-Di Maggio clan from Sicily. They smuggled an estimated US $600 million worth of heroin into the U.S. every year. A lot of this money was sent back to Italy to be invested in legitimate businesses. By 1982 the Inzerillo-Gambino-Spatola holdings in Palermo alone were estimated to be worth one billion US dollars.

The Gambinos had a close relationship with the Italian banker Michele Sindona. When Sindona got in trouble and was indicted for the bankruptcy of the Franklin National Bank, John Gambino procured a false passport and helped to stage a bogus kidnap in August 1979, to conceal a mysterious 11-week trip to Sicily before his scheduled fraud trial. However, Sindona also had put the Mafia's heroin money at risk, due to his financial malpractice. The real purpose of the kidnapping was to issue sparsely disguised blackmail notes to Sindona's past political allies – among them Prime Minister Giulio Andreotti – to engineer the rescue of his banks and recuperate Cosa Nostra's money. The Gambinos accompanied Sindona's attempt to recover the money, but the plans failed and Sindona was arrested, leading to the indictment of the Inzerillo-Spatola-Gambino network. It remains unclear if any of the Mafia money Sindona had lost was recovered. Rosario met Sindona and John Gambino upon his return at JFK Airport.

In 1980, Giovanni Falcone signed an arrest warrant in Italy for the three brothers on drug trafficking charges. The brothers didn't go back to Italy and the United States did not grant extradition, so they went on trial and were convicted of drug trafficking in absentia. In March 1980, Rosario and his brother Joseph were arrested by American authorities for alleged participation in an attempt to import 91 pounds of heroin from Milan, Italy. They were both acquitted of those charges.

In 1984, Gambino and three others went on trial for narcotics trafficking charges in the United States. Gambino was found guilty of selling heroin to undercover police officers and sentenced to 45 years in prison. He was then sent to Federal Correctional Institution, Terminal Island in Los Angeles to serve his sentence.

== Pardon attempt ==
Rosario Gambino made headlines again in 2001 when reports surfaced that in 1995 President Bill Clinton's half-brother Roger Clinton, Jr. had allegedly accepted $50,000 and a Rolex watch from Gambino's children. According to reports, in return Roger said he could guarantee Anna and Tommaso, Rosario's children, a presidential pardon by President Clinton. In 1995, Roger Clinton unsuccessfully lobbied officials for parole for Rosario Gambino. In 1999 when the president was prepared to decide who would be pardoned before his final days in office, Gambino's name was on the list for consideration. Ultimately, the President did not grant Gambino a pardon.

== Deportation and release from prison ==
While in prison Gambino remained in good contact with the Los Angeles crime family members Jimmy Caci and his own son Tommaso. The Italian government attempted to extradite Gambino in 2001, based on an in absentia conviction for drug trafficking. The U.S. District Court in California denied the request because Gambino had already been convicted on similar charges in New York. In 2006, Gambino was released from prison after serving 22 years and then transferred to an immigrant detention center in California to await expulsion to Italy.

In September 2007, an immigration judge in Los Angeles cited the United Nations Convention Against Torture in ruling that Gambino should not be deported. The judge found that in Italy, Gambino would probably be locked up in a harsh, life-threatening and life-shortening prison system designed to compel inmates to reveal information about the Sicilian Mafia (see article 41-bis prison regime). Similar reasoning was used to prevent his brothers from being deported after their criminal convictions. Immigration and Customs Enforcement successfully appealed the ruling.

On May 23, 2009, Gambino arrived at Rome's Leonardo da Vinci-Fiumicino Airport, where he was taken into custody. He was released while his lawyer, Daniele Francesco Lelli, pursued an appeal with the Court of Cassation, Italy’s top criminal court. However, shortly after his release from prison, the Palermo Appeals Court issued an arrest warrant for Gambino on October 27, 2011. He was arrested in a Rome clinic where he had checked in for medical tests. Gambino appealed the conviction and on February 3, 2014, he was acquitted of drug trafficking charges and was freed from prison. In July 2019 Gambino was arrested in coordinated, international police raids.
