= Louis Tom Dragna =

Italian-American mobster

- Born: July 18, 1920; Los Angeles, California, U.S.
- Died: November 16, 2012 (aged 92); Los Angeles, California, U.S.
- Other names: The Reluctant Prince, Lou Allen
- Parent: Tom Dragna
- Relatives: Jack Dragna (uncle)
- Allegiance: Los Angeles crime family

Louis Tom Dragna (Italian: [ˈdraɲɲa]; July 18, 1920 – November 16, 2012) was an Italian-American mobster, nephew of Jack Dragna and son of Tom Dragna. He was active in the Los Angeles crime family from the 1940s until the early 1980s.

== Early life ==
Louis Tom Dragna was born on July 18, 1920, in Los Angeles, California to Tom Dragna and Julia Torisco. He had a younger brother, Frank Paul Dragna (nicknamed "Two Eyes" to distinguish him from his cousin with the same name and had a glass eye, from a combat injury he received in World War II.) and a sister, Anna Dragna. They are second generation immigrants and Louis was the only younger Dragna to be heavily involved in the Mafia. His grandparents, Francesco Paolo Dragna and Anna Dragna, immigrated to the United States on November 18, 1898, but returned to Sicily 10 years later. His family then returned to New York City in the 1910s and made their way West to California. In 1931 his uncle Jack Dragna became Boss of the Los Angeles crime family and named his father Tom his Consigliere.

== Criminal career ==
According to his army enlistment record, Louis Dragna spent two years in college. He started to become involved in the crime family in the 1940s. Under his uncle Jack, the Mafia in Los Angeles was growing into a very widespread enterprise. Louis had an arrest record dating back to 1946. Dragna became a made man in 1947 along with Jimmy "The Weasel" Fratianno, Dominic Brooklier, Joseph Dippolito, and Salvatore "Dago Louie" Piscopo. Louis Dragna was eventually promoted to Captain (caporegime) in the family by his uncle. Some, including Fratianno, say that Louis never "made his bones" i.e. committed a murder on the Mafia's orders.

In 1959, Dragna was arrested with mobsters Joe Sica, Frankie Carbo, Frank "Blinky" Palermo, and Truman Gibson for extorting Jackie Leonard, the manager of boxing champion Don Jordan in 1958. They were accused of trying to muscle in on the fight earnings of Jordan. On May 30, 1961, they were all found guilty in Los Angeles Federal District Court of conspiring to extort money and of transmitting by interstate commerce threats of harm to Jackie Leonard and sentenced to prison times of various lengths, with Dragna sentenced to five years. The defendants appealed their ruling and on February 13, 1963, the U.S. Court of Appeals affirmed the conviction of four of the defendants, with only Dragna's sentence being overturned. His lawyers argued that the case against Dragna was weak and questioned Leonard's creditability. Leonard's only testimony on Dragna stated that he was present at the times threats were made against him, but that Dragna never made any threats himself.

On June 16, 1960, the Nevada Gaming Commission opened its first Black Book. It is a list of all persons who are banned from entering any casino in Nevada. Dragna was one of the 11 original entries to the list and was the last surviving member from the original black book when he died in 2012. In the 1940s Johnny Dio taught Dragna how to manipulate labour unions in the Garment District. By the 1970s Dragna's garment company, "Roberta Manufacturing Co." was a $10+ million a year business. When Los Angeles Mob boss Dominic Brooklier was imprisoned in 1975, he chose Dragna as his co acting boss, along with Jimmy Fratianno to run the Los Angeles family while he was in prison. Brooklier knew Dragna would never have had the nerve or the inclination to try and take over the family permanently. Dragna, however, declined the opportunity unless Fratianno was his co boss, and the job was given to both men. Dragna's refusal to become boss, despite his uncle's and father's former positions in the family earned him the nickname "the Reluctant Prince". Fratianno wrote in The Last Mafioso that he felt Dragna was so busy with his Roberta Manufacturing Company he did not have time to be a mob boss. Fratianno also wrote the Dragna had never "made his bones"-i.e. killed someone under a Mob boss's orders.

In 1978, Louis Dragna, Michael Rizzitello, Thomas Ricciardi, Jack LoCicero, and Dominick Raffone were indicted on Racketeer Influenced and Corrupt Organizations Act (RICO Act) charges related to the murder of Frank Bompensiero and extortion. On October 14, 1980, Jimmy Fratianno, a longtime member of the Los Angeles family and close associate of Dragna's, testified in the case. During an October 23 hearing, FBI agent John Barron offered testimony that Louis Tom Dragna admitted to being a member of the Mafia and gave up the leadership structure of the Los Angeles crime family at a meeting held on October 14, 1976. Dragna started serving a one-year sentence in a community center in 1984. He was released on March 18, 1985, and completed his sentence which included 1,000 hours of community service. After serving his sentence, Dragna was forced to step away from organized crime.

According to federal prosecutors, Peter Milano once discussed in the 1980s with members of the Cleveland crime family a plot to have Dragna murdered for violating the oath of omertà. During Milano's arrest in 1987, prosecutors were going to call Cleveland crime family underboss-turned-government witness Angelo Lonardo to testify to this allegation. Milano's lawyer strongly denied these allegations, stating that if it were true, Dragna would have received a formal warning from the FBI. Milano pleaded guilty to racketeering charges and a trial never took place.
