= Joseph Sica =

American gangster (1911-1982)

- Sica in 1961
- Born: August 20, 1911; Newark, New Jersey, U.S.
- Died: November 21, 1982 (aged 70); Los Angeles, California, U.S.
- Other name: "JS"
- Occupation: Mobster
- Allegiance: Los Angeles crime family

Joseph "JS" Sica (August 20, 1911 – November 21, 1982) was an American mobster and member of the Los Angeles crime family who was involved in armed robbery, murder for hire, extortion, and narcotics distribution. Originally from New Jersey, Sica mentored many West Coast mobsters, including Mike Rizzitello and Anthony "the Animal" Fiato. Christopher "Chris" Petti was Sica's longtime partner in the Los Angeles and San Diego rackets. Sica's brothers Alfred, Angelo, and Frank were also associates of Sica's.

== Biography ==
Born in Newark, New Jersey, Sica was first arrested in 1926 at age 15. In 1950, Sica was indicted with 15 other mobsters for conspiracy to distribute narcotics in California. However, the case was dismissed after Abraham Davidian, the prosecution's star witness, was shot to death while sleeping at his mother's home in Fresno, California. During the 1950s, the Permanent Subcommittee on Investigations of the U.S. Senate Committee on Government Operations identified Sica as a prominent member of the Los Angeles crime family and an associate of mobsters Mickey Cohen, Salvatore Iannone, and Thomas DeMaio.

Sica once refused an order by L.A. Boss Jack Dragna to kill friend Mickey Cohen. Defying Dragna made Sica a well-respected man amongst Cohen and his bookmakers, but it alienated the L.A. family against him. Cohen's bookies sided with Sica and in an attempt to avoid another gambling war, Sica gave up a piece of his lucrative bookmaking business to Dragna. Sica worked in Los Angeles so long that he eventually became a close associate of the L.A. family.

In 1961, Sica, Frankie Carbo, Frank "Blinky" Palermo and Truman Gibson Jr. were convicted in Los Angeles of conspiracy in connection with professional boxing. Sica and the others exerted influence over Don Nesseth, the manager of welterweight champion Don Jordan, in order to gain control of the boxer's professional activities and a share of his purse. Sica was sentenced to twenty years' imprisonment and fined $10,000. The U.S. Court of Appeals for the Ninth Circuit upheld the convictions in 1963.

Joseph Sica died in the Sun Valley neighborhood of Los Angeles on November 21, 1982, at the age of 70.
