= Tom Dragna =

American mobster (1888–1977)

- Dragna in 1950
- Born: Gaetano Dragna; November 25, 1888; Corleone, Sicily, Kingdom of Italy
- Died: September 30, 1977 (aged 88); Los Angeles, California, U.S.
- Resting place: Valhalla Memorial Park Cemetery, North Hollywood, Los Angeles, U.S.
- Citizenship: American
- Occupation: Mobster
- Successor: Nick Licata
- Children: 3, including Louis Tom Dragna
- Relatives: Jack Dragna (brother)
- Allegiance: Los Angeles crime family

Tom Dragna (born Gaetano Dragna; Italian: [ɡaeˈtaːno ˈdraɲɲa]; November 25, 1888 – September 30, 1977) was a Sicilian-American bootlegger and mobster who became a member of the Los Angeles crime family. He was the brother of Jack Dragna and the father of Louis Tom Dragna. He remained an obscure figure until he was featured in The Last Mafioso: The Treacherous World of Jimmy Fratianno in 1981.

== Early life ==
Dragna was born in Corleone in Sicily in 1888. He was the middle child of Francesco Paolo Dragna and Anna Dragna. He had an older sister, Giuseppa, and a younger brother, Ignazio. At the age of nine, they moved to New York City on November 18, 1898.

== Los Angeles ==
He and his brother Ignazio, who now renamed themselves Tom and Jack, respectively, then moved to Los Angeles. Unlike his brother, Tom became a naturalized citizen. While in California, Tom married Julia Torisco, and fathered three children: Frank Paul, Louis Tom and Anna Dragna. He owned a ranch in West Puente Valley, California. During the 1920s they were involved in bootlegging and were closely allied with Joseph Ardizzone. On multiple occasions, Dragna was arrested for violating the national prohibition law. After Ardizzone's disappearance in 1931, Jack became Boss of the Los Angeles crime family and named Tom his consigliere. Another close supporter of theirs, Girolamo "Momo" Adamo, was named underboss.

=== Consigliere ===
Dragna was a planner in some unsuccessful attempts on Mickey Cohen's life. Dragna was an expert at dynamite and set up the two bombs that were planted in Cohen's home. The first one didn't go off after the fuse failed to fully light. The second time, the bomb went off, but was placed near a safe, which shielded Cohen. In 1950, Dragna along with his son Louis, and two men named Frank Paul Dragna (his son and nephew, respectively) were arrested after Jack fled the state after being named in the California Crime Commission report as a member of a crime syndicate in Los Angeles. The four along with Girolamo "Momo" Adamo were taken into custody by authorities, who believed they were responsible for bombing Cohen's home or knew who was. After being questioned, none of them were charged and they were released. Dragna bought a desert ranch outside of Las Vegas in 1951 in hopes of turning it into a casino. Jack Dragna was unable to build a casino and his attempt almost led to his deportation.

According to the book The Last Mafioso, Dragna had the best aim with a gun in the crime family. As consigliere he was able to get his son Louis to become an official member of the L.A. family. When Jack Dragna died in 1956, Tom stepped back from the criminal life when Frank DeSimone was named boss of the family. He still remained close to the crime family afterwards, however.

== Death ==
On September 30, 1977, Dragna died of natural causes at the age of 88. He is buried in Valhalla Memorial Park Cemetery, Burbank, California.

== Notes ==
- Demaris, Ovid (1981). The Last Mafioso: The Treacherous World of Jimmy Fratianno. Bantam Books. ISBN 0-553-27091-5.

American Mafia
Preceded by None	Los Angeles crime family Consigliere; 1931-1956	Succeeded by Nick Licata
