= Jimmy Caci =

American mobster

- LAPD mugshot of Caci from 1984
- Born: Vincent Dominic Caci; August 1, 1925; Westfield, New York, U.S.
- Died: August 16, 2011 (aged 86); Rancho Mirage, California, U.S.
- Resting place: Holy Sepulchre Cemetery, Cheektowaga, New York; 42.9272°N 78.7795°W
- Known for: Mafia activity

Vincent Dominic "Jimmy" Caci (born August 1, 1925 – died August 16, 2011) was an American mobster and a caporegime in the Los Angeles crime family.

Caci was born in Westfield, New York to Alfonzo and Josephine Caci, one of eight siblings. He grew up in Western New York. In the 1970s, Caci spent eight years at Attica prison for armed robbery where he met Stephen "the Whale" Cino. They would both eventually switch to the Los Angeles family. In the late 1970s he moved to Southern California. He was promoted to caporegime shortly after by boss Peter Milano. Until his death, he remained active as a loan shark in Palm Springs and Las Vegas. Caci kept close ties to the Buffalo crime family and helped contribute to the growing ties between the two families. He owned his own construction company in Erie, Pennsylvania and was the owner of a restaurant and night club in New York and California. His younger brother, Charles James Caci, was a nightclub singer, known as "Bobby Milano". Until his death in 2006, Charles was a soldier in his brother's crew. Other members of Caci's crew included Cino, Rocco Zangari, Steven Mauriello and Vince Lupo along with associates Kenny Gallo, Tommy Jones (a suspected enforcer and hitman, alleged to have committed his first contract killing at 18), Robert "Puggy" Zeichick, and Alfred Mauriello.

In 1984, Caci was arrested with some twenty other Los Angeles mobsters for attempting to take over a $1 million a week illegal bookmaking operation. However, due to lack of evidence, Caci was not charged. When Peter and Carmen Milano were sentenced to prison in 1988, Caci became street boss of the Los Angeles family for a short time. In August 1996, Caci was sentenced to 42 months in prison for conspiracy, wire fraud, and interstate transportation of fraudulently obtained money for his role in a telemarketing scheme that victimized over 100 people in the Midwest. Caci avoided serious jail time by the FBI in connection with the Las Vegas RICO cases "Operation Thin Crust" and "Operation Button Down", which were investigations into Mafia influence in Southern Nevada in 1997. In 1998 Caci was convicted and received a six-month sentence.

Owning a home in Palm Springs, Caci died on August 16, 2011, aged 86, at the Eisenhower Medical Center in Rancho Mirage, California. He is buried at Holy Sepulchre Cemetery, Cheektowaga, New York.
