= Los Angeles crime family =

Italian-American organized crime group

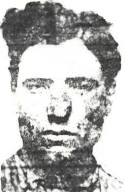
- Joseph Ardizzone, the first boss of the Los Angeles family
- Founded: c. 1900s
- Founder: Joseph Ardizzone
- Named after: Jack Dragna
- Founding location: Los Angeles, California, United States
- Years active: c. 1900s–present
- Territory: Primarily Greater Los Angeles, with additional territory throughout Southern California, as well as Las Vegas
- Ethnicity: Italians as "made men" and other ethnicities as associates
- Membership (est.): 15–20 made members (2003)
- Activities: Racketeering, loansharking, money laundering, murder, extortion, gambling, drug trafficking, fencing, fraud, prostitution and pornography
- Allies: Bufalino crime family; Buffalo crime family; Chicago Outfit; Cleveland crime family; Colombo crime family; Detroit Partnership; Gambino crime family; Kansas City crime family; New Orleans crime family; Patriarca crime family; San Francisco crime family; San Jose crime family; Armenian Power; Hells Angels MC; Mexican Mafia
- Rivals: Cohen crime family; and various other gangs in the Los Angeles area

The Los Angeles crime family, also known as the Dragna crime family, the Southern California crime family or the L.A. Mafia, and dubbed "the Mickey Mouse Mafia" by former Los Angeles Police Chief Daryl Gates, is an Italian American Mafia crime family based in Los Angeles, California, as part of the larger American Mafia. Since its inception in the early 20th century, the family has spread throughout Southern California.

Like most Mafia families in the United States, the Los Angeles crime family gained wealth and power through bootlegging alcohol during the Prohibition era. The L.A. family reached its peak strength in the 1940s and early 1950s under Jack Dragna, although the family was never larger than the New York or Chicago families. The Los Angeles crime family itself has been on a gradual decline, with the Chicago Outfit representing them on The Commission since the death of boss Jack Dragna in 1956.

The sources for much of the current information on the history of the Los Angeles Cosa Nostra family is the courtroom testimony and the published biographies of Aladena "Jimmy the Weasel" Fratianno, who in the late 1970s became the second member – and the first acting boss – in American Mafia history to testify against Mafia members, and The Last Mafioso (1981), a biography of Fratianno by Ovid Demaris. Since the 1980s, the Racketeer Influenced and Corrupt Organizations Act (RICO Act) has been effective in convicting mobsters and shrinking the American Mafia; like all families in the United States, the L.A. Mafia now only holds a fraction of its former power. Not having a strong concentration of Italian Americans in the region leaves the family to contend with the many street gangs of other ethnicities in the city. The Los Angeles crime family is the last Mafia family left in the state of California.

== Origins and predecessors ==
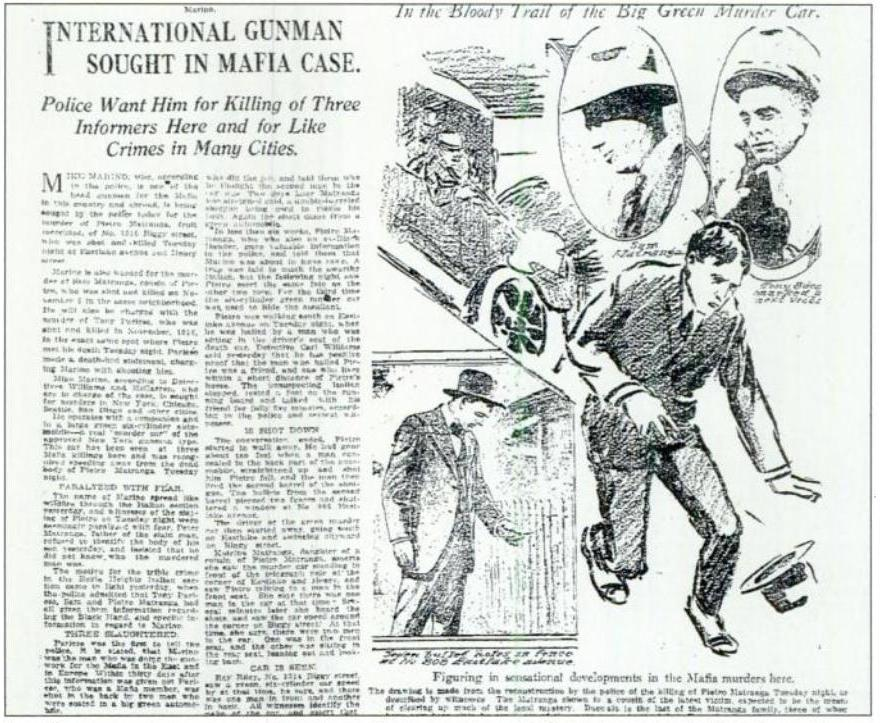
Los Angeles Times newspaper in 1917. Pictured in the top right corner are Sam Matranga and Tony Buccola. The drawing is a depiction of the murder of Pietro Matranga

The early years of organized crime in California were marked by the division of various Italian street gangs, such as the Black Hand organizations, in the early 20th century. The most prominent of these was the Matranga family, which was a family of Arbereshe origin. Their legitimate business was fruit vending; otherwise, they used threats, violence, arson, and extortion to control the Plaza area, which was the heart of the Italian American community of Los Angeles at the time. Its first leader was Rosario "Sam" Matranga (often misreported as "Orsario" due to a typo on his death record), who started leading the family around 1905. Sam's relatives Salvatore Matranga, Pietro "Peter" Matranga, and Antonio "Tony" Matranga were other members of the gang.

When prominent Black Hand leader Joseph Ardizzone was involved in a dispute with George Maisano, a member of the Matranga gang, they both went to Joseph Cuccia to mediate the dispute. Cuccia was a well-respected criminal amongst the underworld, as well as a translator in court for Italians who did not speak English. This made him a well-liked man in the Italian community.

Cuccia was a relative of Ardizzone's and ruled in Ardizzone's favor, causing the Matrangas to threaten Cuccia. In response, Ardizzone shot and killed Maisano on July 2, 1906. Ardizzone then became a wanted fugitive.

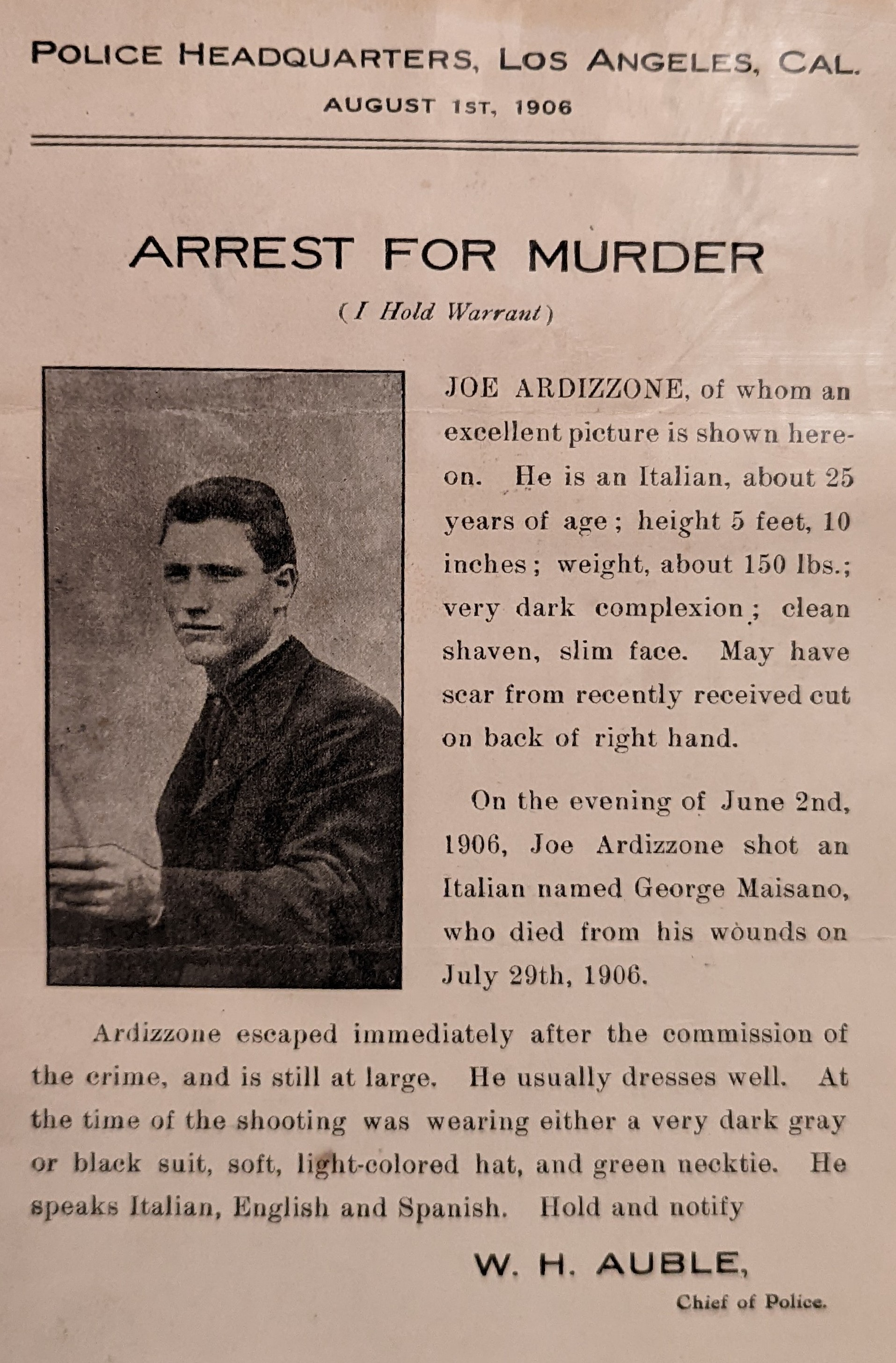
Joe Ardizzone wanted poster

With Ardizzone gone, the Matrangas fulfilled their promise of revenge. On September 25, 1906, Cuccia was shot and killed, allegedly by Tony Matranga. With both Ardizzone and Cuccia gone, the Matrangas became the dominant criminal force in the Italian Plaza community. To expand their power, they began cooperating with the police. Giving up information on their enemies and receiving immunity for most of their crimes, the Matrangas were able to expand their power and influence.

Ardizzone returned to Los Angeles in 1914 and resumed his feud with the Matranga family. Sam and his successor, Pietro "Peter" Matranga, were both murdered within 33 days of each other in 1917. Mike Marino (aka Mike Rizzo), an Ardizzone ally, was responsible for the murders. While their next leader, cousin Tony Buccola, was able to get revenge and kill Marino in 1919, many years of violence ruined the Matranga family. It was becoming clear that Ardizzone's faction was winning the war. With the rise of bootleggers in the 1920s, the Matranga's power declined and was eliminated with Buccola's disappearance in 1930.

Vito Di Giorgio, a Black Hander and grocery store owner, moved to the United States from Palermo, Sicily , in 1904, and to Los Angeles from New Orleans in 1920. With the continuing Ardizzone-Matranga feud, Di Giorgio was able to bring some order to the Los Angeles underworld. Di Giorgio was known as an intimidating and forceful man who conflicted with several local underworld factions. Di Giorgio maintained strong connections with mobsters in New Orleans, Colorado, and Chicago, and was a close friend and mob associate of New York City mobster Giuseppe Morello, the first boss of the Morello crime family. Di Giorgio survived two attempts on his life before he was murdered in Chicago in 1922 while having a haircut.

His underboss Rosario DeSimone, who moved from Pueblo, Colorado to Los Angeles around the same time as Di Giorgio, was another longtime power figure who stayed out of the city and operated bootlegging rackets quietly in Los Angeles County. DeSimone officially stepped down from the top position in the 1920s, but was still a power within the Los Angeles underworld.

Albert Marco seized control of Los Angeles in the 1920s not by working with the local Mafia, but with the "City Hall Gang", a political machine in Los Angeles run by Kent Kane Parrot and Charles H. Crawford. This transformed Marco into the Vice Lord of Los Angeles, earning $500,000 from bordello prostitution alone. With Crawford and Parrot controlling city hall and the local press, the City Hall Gang was able to operate bootlegging, prostitution, and illegal gambling rackets in the shadows with little law enforcement scrutiny. This all changed when Marco was convicted of assault with a deadly weapon in 1928, and the City Hall Gang broke down after a reform movement swept L.A. in the late 1920s.

After that, a host of mobsters fought to take control of liquor operations that Marco and the City Hall Gang previously dominated. In 1928, August Palumbo was the seventh bootlegger killed in a six-week period. Palumbo was Marco's former lieutenant and was killed for refusing to fall in line with DeSimone. DeSimone's lieutenant Dominic DiCiolla (aka Dominick De Soto) was acquitted of the murder and took control of Palumbo's liquor operations. When DiCiolla tried to challenge higher powers by moving in on syndicated gambling rackets, he was murdered in 1931.

== History ==
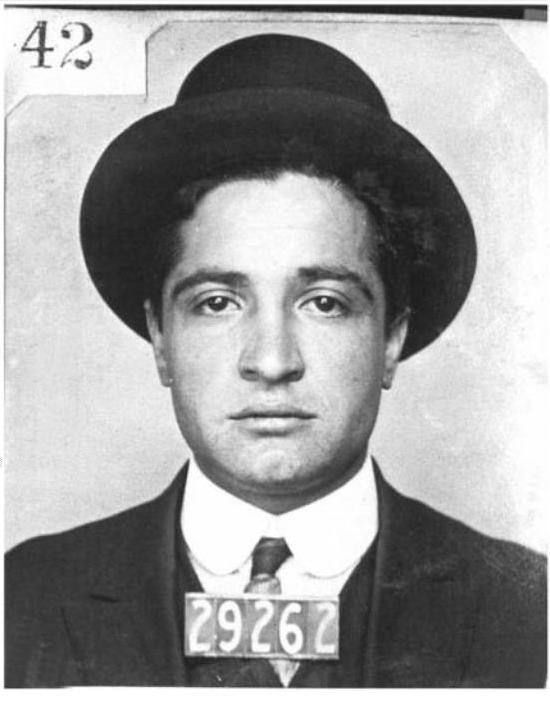
1915 mug shot of Jack Dragna

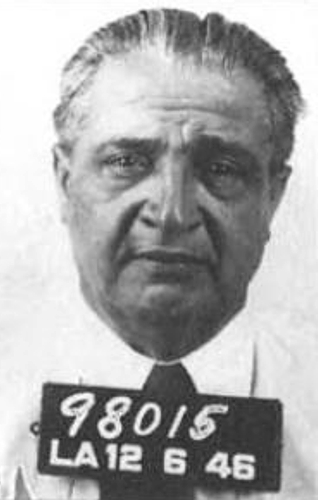
1946 mug shot of Jack Dragna

Joseph "Iron Man" Ardizzone returned to California in 1914 and was acquitted of murdering Maisano in 1915 due to a lack of evidence, as no witnesses were willing to testify. He returned to power and quickly started expanding his rackets in Los Angeles. Ardizzone teamed up with Jack Dragna , and they worked closely together for over 10 years. During prohibition, the two were successful in running bootlegging operations in Southern California as well as gambling and extortion.

By the end of the 1920s, he was rapidly expanding his power and influence. Under Ardizzone's tenure, organized crime began consolidating under his banner as he dominated criminal activities in L.A. In the late 1920s, Dragna and Johnny Roselli constantly battled Charlie Crawford for control of the lucrative bootlegging rackets. With the deaths of Buccola and DiCiolla in 1930 and 1931, respectively, Ardizzone (who was a suspect in both murders) was the undisputed leader of crime in L.A. He set up the Italian Protective League, with Dragna as its president, Ardizzone as its vice president, and California State Senator Joseph Pedrotti as its chairman. The organization had some political and social motives, but mostly served as a strong-arm muscle for the crime family.

=== Dragna era ===
From left to right: Louis Dragna, Tom Dragna, Frank Dragna, Girolamo "Momo" Adamo and Frank Paul Dragna

Ardizzone's reign as boss was ended when he mysteriously disappeared in 1931 while driving to his cousin's home in Etiwanda. Jack Dragna took control of the family and made peace with the National Mafia Syndicate. In addition, his brother Tom Dragna was made his consigliere while his nephew Louis Tom Dragna became a "made man" in 1947.

Dragna was the most successful boss the L.A. family ever had. Although he was not able to infiltrate many of the labor unions in the entertainment industry, he involved the Los Angeles family in the entertainment business, and brought the L.A. Mafia onto the national stage. He was honored with a place on The Commission, the only boss west of Chicago to hold a spot on the council.

When prohibition ended in 1933, Dragna operated a massive loan shark and illegal gambling business. Along with close supporter John Roselli, Dragna's Mafia family ended local gang wars by driving older gambling syndicate headed by Guy McAfee and Milton "Farmer" Page out of business. Dragna and Roselli worked with Joe Shaw (the brother of Mayor Frank Shaw) to muscle out L.A. bookies, many of whom fled to Las Vegas. By 1937, the Los Angeles crime family controlled the illegal gambling in Los Angeles.

For independent bookmakers, Dragna would use extortion to collect money from their operations. While most mobsters simply threatened harm on a business for not paying tribute to their organization (protection racket), Dragna's family came up with a more sophisticated course of action. Dragna would send in men to threaten businesses, then the owners would pay Dragna for protection (unaware that these were Dragna's own men).

Dragna was not, however, able to control 100% of independent gambling rackets. Along with Dragna avoiding the spotlight and public life, he acquired the reputation as a weak ruler. According to Mickey Cohen, Dragna was very powerful and very well respected, but did not put things together the way the East Coast bosses preferred. Although there was not as big a pool of Italians to recruit on the West Coast as there was back East, the L.A. family worked around this by accepting members from across the country, such as Johnny Roselli from Chicago, Nick Licata from Detroit, and Aladena "Jimmy the Weasel" Fratianno and Dominic Brooklier from Cleveland. Armed with top hitman Frank Bompensiero and Jimmy Fratianno (who committed over 30 murders on the orders of their superiors), Dragna muscled his way into controlling territory stretching throughout California and Southern Nevada. The Dragna family also had connections within the Los Angeles County Sheriff's Department, who were more corrupt than the city police (LAPD). Although not having a big hand in labor union rackets, the Dragna crime family did infiltrate some unions in the laundromat and dress importing business.

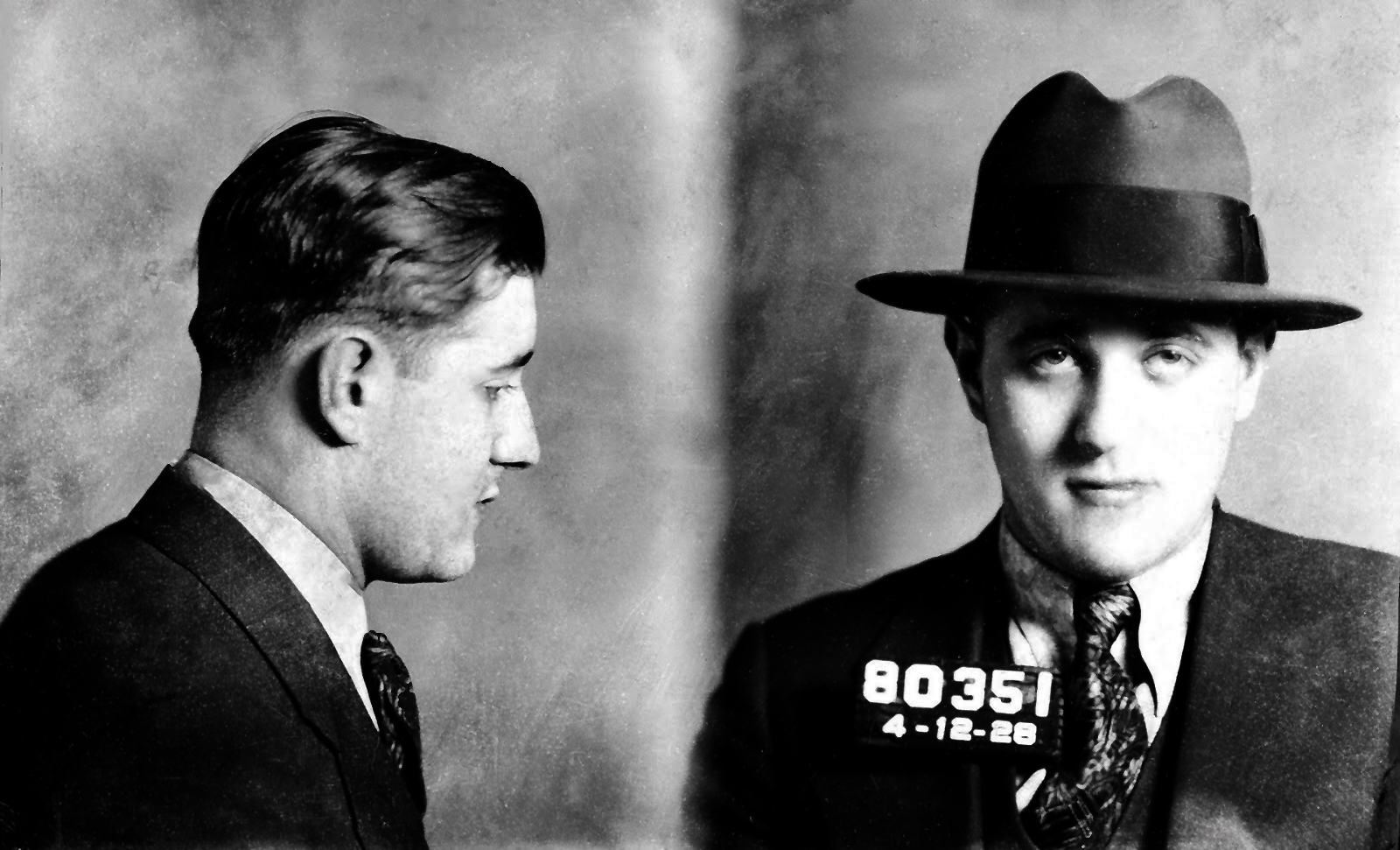
Benjamin "Bugsy" Siegel moved to Los Angeles in 1937 and stayed on the West Coast until his death in 1947

When Lucky Luciano sent Benjamin "Bugsy" Siegel from New York City to Los Angeles to take control of their interests on the West Coast (including Las Vegas), he formed an uneasy partnership with Dragna. Siegel was able to get independent bookies to pay tribute to Dragna's already flourishing gambling business. Aside from this, however, Dragna resented Siegel's power to infiltrate unions in the movie industry. Siegel made millions extorting movie production companies and only had to pay Dragna a tribute for working on his territory. With New York on Siegel's side, there was little Dragna could do to take control of The Commission's grip on the city.

The main reason Siegel came to California was to organize a horse racing wire service on the West Coast for the National Syndicate, which Siegel and Dragna worked closely together on setting up. Dragna and Siegel tried many methods to take over Continental Press Service (the main wire service at the time). Attempts to buy out the company and to strong-arm its owners did not work, so they set up their own company called Trans-America. The Chicago Outfit eventually took over rival Continental Racing Services and gave the entire percentage of the racing wire on the West Coast to Dragna, enraging Siegel.

==== Battle of Sunset Strip ====
Once Siegel ran out of favor with New York, he was ordered to be killed. Although his murder officially remains unsolved, one theory is that Dragna's men were given the order to kill him. After Siegel's death, his chief lieutenant Mickey Cohen took over his remaining gambling and loan shark operations in Los Angeles. He refused to fall in line behind Dragna and Dragna saw this as an opportunity to eliminate him as Cohen began to create his own crime family that quickly began to rival Dragna's. Dragna first began recruiting Cohen's Italian men such as Dominic Brooklier to his family and killing his other men such as David Ogul, Frank Niccoli, Neddie Herbert, and Harold "Hooky" Rothman. However, through sheer luck, Cohen survived many attempts on his life (John Roselli compared Cohen to Bugs Moran). In 1951, Cohen was imprisoned for tax evasion and the L.A. family moved in on his gambling business.

The number of high-profile murders and gangsters moving into the West Coast, combined with the recall of Mayor Frank L. Shaw because of corruption charges related to organized crime, caused law enforcement to stop accommodating the Mafia. In the late 1930s California Attorney General Earl Warren took command of a tough assault on Dragna's empire, most notably shutting down the gambling ships run by Anthony Cornero. On February 14, 1950, the California Commission on Organized Crime singled out Dragna as the head of a crime syndicate that controlled crime in Southern California. Soon after, several of his family members were arrested for the bombing of Mickey Cohen's home.

Dragna fled the state and was wanted for questioning. He later surrendered, and was questioned in the Kefauver hearings along with Roselli and Bompensiero, but denied all accusations against him. Dragna's family, however, remained strong throughout the early 1950s.

=== DeSimone and Licata ===
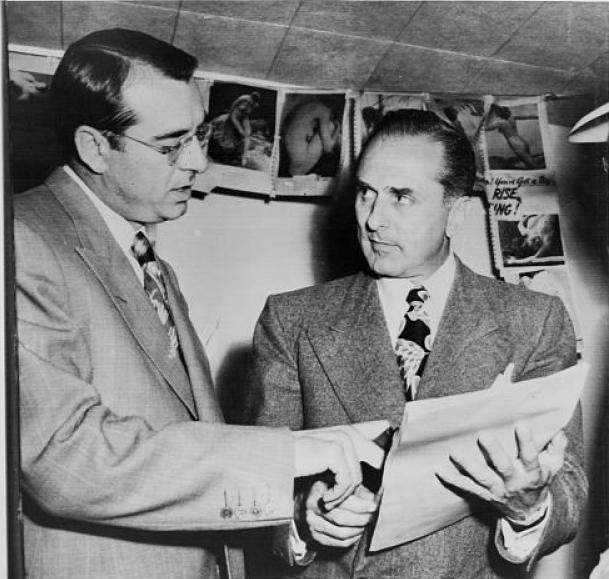
Frank DeSimone (left) and John Roselli

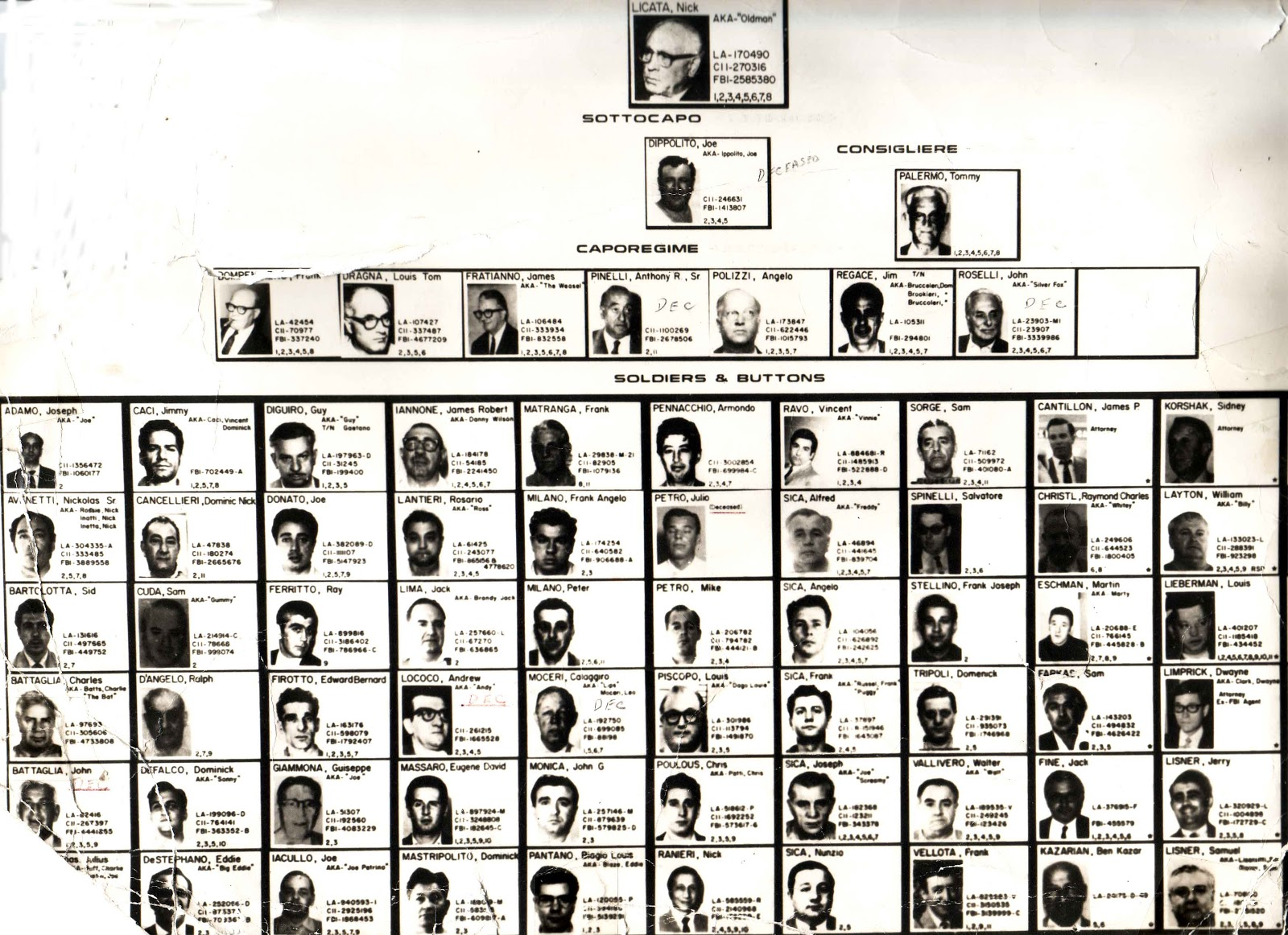
FBI chart of the Los Angeles family in 1960

While other Mafia families in the country were prospering in the 1950s, the L.A. family was beginning its decline. When William H. Parker became Chief of Police for the Los Angeles Police Department in 1950, the police started cracking down on organized crime instead of assisting it. The weakened Los Angeles family lost ground to the Chicago Outfit and New York families. Due to over 50 unsolved gangland killings in the first half of the century, the L.A.P.D. formed a special task force to deal with the problem: "The Gangster Squad". This group of men harassed Dragna's family, as well as Cohen's, throughout the 1950s. Frank Bompensiero and Jimmy Fratianno started serving prison sentences in 1953 and 1954, respectively.

In 1956 Jack Dragna died of a heart attack. The senior members of the family voted for its new boss. Johnny Roselli was seen as the most logical choice, but lawyer-turned-gangster Frank DeSimone was victorious. A disappointed Roselli, who felt that DeSimone rigged the election, transferred back to the Chicago Outfit. Fratianno did the same after his release from prison in 1960.

With Dragna gone and his brother Tom retired after his death, the crime family slipped out of control. It quickly became apparent that DeSimone was an incompetent boss. According to an unidentified informant, he raped the wife of former underboss Girolamo "Momo" Adamo, which caused Adamo to shoot his wife (who survived) and kill himself. This meant the top three men from Dragna's era, the boss, underboss, and consigliere were all inactive in Los Angeles almost immediately after DeSimone took charge.

DeSimone was present at the ill-fated Apalachin Meeting with his underboss Simone Scozzari. When the meeting was raided by police, DeSimone was outed as a mobster. He previously had no arrest record and was believed to be a simple lawyer. Scozzari came under law enforcement scrutiny after the meeting and was deported to Italy in 1962 for being an illegal immigrant.

By 1965, it was estimated that the number of members of the L.A. family living in Los Angeles had dwindled to 30, while the family actually had a strong presence in San Diego. DeSimone worried about "shaking down" gamblers and bookmakers for fear that they would run to the police. In the 1960s, Bonanno crime family boss Joseph Bonanno plotted to have DeSimone killed for failing to exploit the criminal opportunities in Los Angeles. The plan was thwarted, but caused DeSimone to become very paranoid, never leaving his house at night. DeSimone's unsuccessful reign concluded with his death in 1967, after 11 years in power.

DeSimone's second underboss Nick "Old Man" Licata succeeded him. Licata had strong ties with Mafia families in the Midwest and South and maintained contact with the mob in Las Vegas. By then, law enforcement knew much about mob activities in Los Angeles, which was helped by top hitman Frank Bompensiero becoming an undercover informant in 1967. In 1963, Joe Valachi outed the Mafia as a secret criminal society, aiding in law enforcement's attacks on organized crime, and fingered Licata as a high ranking mobster in Los Angeles.

A bright spot during the period was that Louis Tom Dragna's company "Roberta Dress Manufacturing" was turning into a $10 million a year business. This was possible because in the 1950s, Jack Dragna flew labor union expert Johnny Dio in from New York City to teach Louis how to manipulate labor unions in the Los Angeles Garment District. Licata had high hopes of restoring the declining family, but with the police and FBI constantly monitoring his family, Licata wasn't able to do much of a better job than DeSimone. On July 9, 1969, Licata was held in contempt of court after refusing to answer questions at a federal grand jury session about L.A.'s crime syndicate structure after being given immunity from prosecution. He eventually served six months in prison.

A pair of indictments in the mid-1970s threatened to put most of the working family in prison. In March 1973, seven men were arrested for running a rigged gambling operation in Los Angeles that brought in up to $250,000 a month. Their trial was delayed when the key informant and witness, former Mafia associate John Dubcek, was shot and killed in Las Vegas. Although this scared other informants from testifying, the defendants were convicted and given light sentences.

Four months later, another 12 men were indicted for conspiracy, racketeering and extortion against bookmakers, loan sharks, and pornographers.

Licata's underboss Joseph Dippolito had a large influence in San Bernardino and the Inland Empire in both legitimate and criminal enterprises. He was seen as Licata's successor, but died unexpectedly of a heart attack in January 1974 at the age of 59. On October 19, 1974, after a long battle with illnesses, Nick Licata died at age 77.

=== Fratianno flips ===
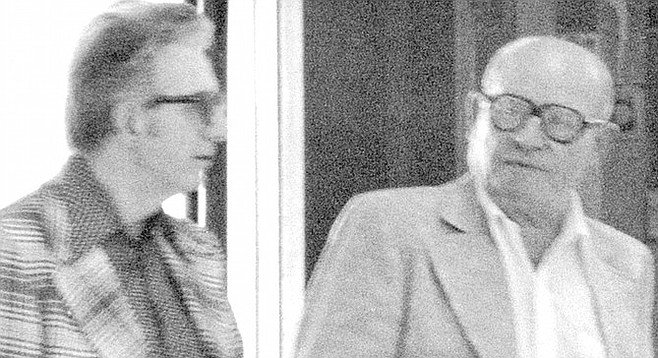
Longtime members Jimmy Fratianno (left) and Frank Bompensiero rose to become acting boss and consigliere, respectively, of the LA family in the 1970s

Licata's successor, Dominic Brooklier, was initially able to stabilize the family's businesses, but later endured considerable damage done by FBI informants. Brooklier was able to make a lot of money in pornography, extortion, and drugs, but wasn't able to take back control of many independent bookmaking rackets in Los Angeles. The Last Mafioso described several instances during the time when the Los Angeles family would shake down movie producers in the porn industry. These producers would then pay a fee to their Mafia backers, usually on the East Coast, to set things straight with the L.A. mob. Once the producers paid, the Mafia backers would secretly split the money with the L.A. family.

Brooklier later ordered the death of Frank Bompensiero for his growing criticism of the family, and later finding good evidence that Bompensiero was cooperating with the FBI. When Brooklier was sentenced to a 20-month prison stint along with underboss Samuel Sciortino in 1975, Jimmy Fratianno on Tom Dragna's request, transferred back to the L.A. family from Chicago, and was named co-acting Los Angeles boss with Dragna. Fratianno traveled across the country making new connections and deals. Fratianno's goal was to bring back the ailing L.A. family stature and reputation amongst the Mafia. Since Jack Dragna's 1956 death, Los Angeles was starting to be seen as an "open city" where any Mafia family could do business, but Fratianno hoped that by restoring the ailing family, he would be a candidate to officially run the family after Brooklier was released. However, upon release from prison, Brooklier quickly took back control of the family, and Fratianno was left back to being a low level soldier.

The fall of the Los Angeles family came when Fratianno became the second American Mafioso to turn state's evidence and testify against the Mafia in court. On October 6, 1977, Danny Greene was killed by a car bomb in Ohio, and Ray Ferritto was arrested for the murder. Ferritto implicated Fratianno in the planning of the murder, and Fratianno was indicted for charges related to the bombing. Fearing for his safety, Fratianno agreed to become a government witness against the Mafia. In return for his testimony, he pleaded guilty to the murder charges and received a five-year prison sentence, of which he served 21 months. In 1980, after his testimony led to the racketeering convictions of five reputed Mafia figures, Fratianno entered the federal Witness Protection Program. Fratianno claimed that the Mafia had a $100,000 contract on his life. Brooklier, who didn't trust Fratianno, ordered the hit because Fratianno had claimed he was presenting himself as boss of the family, and felt that he was trying to usurp him.

Fratianno testified against mobsters not only in Los Angeles, but across the entire country. Although the Justice Department thought it finally crippled the Mafia in Los Angeles, a Federal Judge gave Brooklier, Sciortino, Michael Rizzitello, Dragna, and Jack LoCicero light sentences ranging from two to five years in 1981 for racketeering and extortion. Brooklier still ran the family from his prison cell until he died of a heart attack in 1984. With Brooklier's imprisonment, capo Peter Milano quickly stepped up and began running the family in 1981.

=== The Milano brothers ===
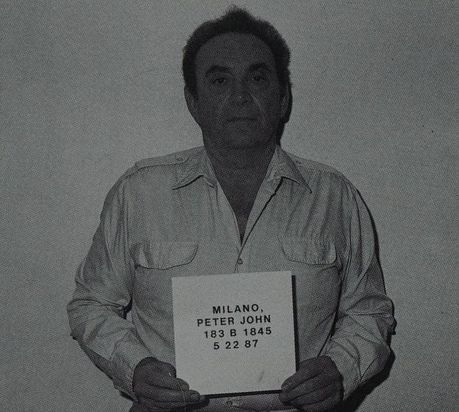
FBI mugshot of Peter Milano in 1987

Peter Milano was officially made boss of the Los Angeles crime family with Brooklier's death in 1984. He made his brother Carmen "Flipper" Milano his underboss. In the years since Milano's reign began, the family was heavily involved in narcotics, pornography, gambling and loan sharking.

Twenty reputed organized crime figures were arrested in 1984, in what law enforcement officials said was a bid to take over a $1 million-a-week bookmaking operation in Los Angeles. Neither of the Milano brothers (nor six of the others originally arrested) were charged due to lack of evidence. When Peter Milano became boss, he rejuvenated the depleted family by inducting new members such as Stephen "Steve the Whale" Cino, singer Charles "Bobby Milano" Caci, Luigi "Louie" Gelfuso Jr. and shylock brothers Lawrence and Anthony "The Animal" Fiato. Mobster turned informant Kenny Gallo credited the brothers with "help[ing] Pete Milano revamp the L.A. Family".

With a beefed-up family, Milano succeeded in having nearly every bookie in Los Angeles pay a mob tax to the L.A. family. After Robert "Puggy" Zeichick gave Anthony Fiato a $1 million loan, which was used to finance a huge loan shark operation the L.A. family became the dominant loan shark operators in the area. The family's influence stretched all the way to Las Vegas, where they had longstanding ties to what the Mafia considered an "open city" where any family could work.

The entire hierarchy of the family, including the Milano brothers, captains Mike Rizzitello, Jimmy Caci, and Luigi Gelfuso, along with many other mobsters were arrested on various charges in the late 1980s, due largely to information and recordings collected by the Fiato brothers. These charges against so many members permanently crippled the family and put the family on the brink of extinction. Rizzitello, who was acquitted of his original charges at trial, was sentenced to 33 years in 1989 for attempted murder; he would die in prison in 2005. The Milano brothers pleaded guilty to lesser charges; Peter received a six-year prison sentence and Carmen received six months. Almost every member of the family charged pleaded guilty to receive lesser sentences and the F.B.I. considered the Mafia finished in Los Angeles.

However, after Peter Milano was released on parole in 1991, he took back control of the weakened family. The Los Angeles family then made moves into Las Vegas with the Buffalo crime family. The family made headlines again with the murder of Chicago Outfit associate Herbert "Fat Herbie" Blitzstein by Buffalo and Los Angeles family associates in 1997. Blizstein had a lucrative loan shark and auto insurance fraud business, which the two families moved in to take over. This caused a great deal of scrutiny of both families by the FBI. Members such as Stephen Cino and Alfred Mauriello were convicted on related charges along with other associates who cooperated with officials to receive a reduced sentence, putting the L.A. crime family on its last legs. By the 1990s, the L.A. family was estimated to have 20 official members, who have, however, been ineffective for many years because the group has not been able to enforce its territorial control.

=== Latest position ===
Much of the crime family's activities have become unknown since the Las Vegas indictments. Law enforcement has redirected its attention towards street gangs such as Mexican and African-American gangs who are far more prevalent and widespread.

Until his death, Peter Milano was still believed to be the official Boss of the Los Angeles crime family. However, since the late 1990s, his involvement in crime along with other members had become greatly reduced. Some members, such as Rocco Zangari and Russell Massetia, moved out of the state and left the family altogether. Other members, such as Carmen Milano and Jimmy Caci, died of old age with no younger people to replace them. Los Angeles does not, unlike the East Coast, have a high concentration of Italians to replenish their ranks, so recruiting new members is challenging. With Southern California's many racial groups, La Cosa Nostra faced an uphill battle to challenge the many street gangs in the area over criminal rackets. Law enforcement also considers East Coast Mafia members moving to California as a threat.

Tommaso "Tommy" Gambino, a Los Angeles-based prosecco magnate and son of Rosario Gambino, became the reputed boss of the family in 2012 after the death of Peter Milano. According to informants for the FBI and the Royal Canadian Mounted Police (RCMP), the Canadian mobster and Musitano crime family associate Albert Iavarone was inducted into the Los Angeles family shortly before he was shot dead in Hamilton, Ontario on September 13, 2018. According to reports from informants, Gambino inducted Iavarone as a favor to New York bosses in order to allow Iavarone to act as a new liaison between the Canadian Mafia and American Mafia. Iavarone was killed two weeks after his alleged induction, reportedly ordered by Joseph Todaro Jr., whose Buffalo crime family had historically been the liaison between Canadian and American mobsters.

== Historical leadership ==
=== Boss (official and acting) ===
- 1922–1925: Rosario DeSimone – stepped down.
- 1925–1931: Joseph "Iron Man" Ardizzone – murdered.
- 1931–1956: Jack Dragna – died on February 23, 1956.
- 1956–1967: Frank DeSimone
- 1967–1974: Nicolo "Old Man Nick" Licata
- 1974–1984: Dominic "Jimmy" Brooklier – imprisoned 1975–1977, 1981–1984, died in 1984.
  - Acting 1975–1977: Aladena "Jimmy The Weasel" Fratianno
  - Acting 1981–1984: Peter Milano – became official boss.
- 1984–2012: Peter Milano – died on April 21, 2012
- 2012–present: Tommaso "Tommy" Gambino

=== Underboss ===
- 1925–1931: Jack Dragna
- 1931–1956: Girolamo "Momo" Adamo – demoted.
- 1956–1962: Simone "Sam" Scozzari
- 1962–1967: Nicolo "Old Man Nick" Licata
- 1967–1974: Joseph "Joe Dip" Dippolito
- 1974: Dominic "Jimmy" Brooklier
- 1974–1979: Samuel Sciortino
- 1984–2006: Carmen Milano
- 2006–2012: Tommaso "Tommy" Gambino – became boss

=== Consigliere ===
- 1931–1956: Gaetano "Tom" Dragna
- 1956–1962: Nicolo "Old Man Nick" Licata
- 1962–1975: Thomas "Tommy" Palermo
- 1975–1977: Frank "Bomp" Bompensiero
- 1977–1982: Giacomo "Jack" LoCicero

== Current members ==
=== Administration ===
- Boss — Tommaso "Tommy" Gambino (born 1973) — Gambino was born in New York City and raised in Palermo before he settled in Los Angeles. He is the son of Rosario "Sal" Gambino, a member of the New Jersey-based Sicilian faction of the Gambino family. Gambino is also related to Frank Cali, the former acting boss of the Gambino family, whom was gunned down in March 2019, and to members of the Inzerillo Mafia clan based in Palermo. Gambino was first associated with the New York based Gambino family whilst he resided in New Jersey, and acting as the liaison between the Gambino family and the Philadelphia family boss, John Stanfa, during the 1990s Merlino-Stanfa war. In around 1994 or 1995, following Stanfa's indictment for illegal gambling, extortion, racketeering and conspiracy to murder, Gambino had relocated to Los Angeles. According to a wiretap, Derek Galanis was overheard saying that Gambino lived on 10800 Wilshire Blvd in Beverly Hills, Galanis was later sentenced to 6 years in prison in February 2017 for his involvement in a $70 million stock fraud case. By 1995, Gambino was inducted into the Los Angeles family as a soldier under LA family boss, Peter Milano, and was placed under a crew headed by former LA family capo, Louis Caruso, Gambino and Caruso were allegedly active in the Los Angeles and Las Vegas area around about this time. In June 1996, Gambino and Caruso had proposed membership to Orlando "Ori" Spado, however Spado was ousted from the family by Kenji Gallo whom revealed that Spado was an informant. According to FBI files, Gambino was introduced to Roger Clinton Jr. through Pasquale Pace, the manager of musician Gino Vannelli, Clinton was allegedly given $50,000 and a Rolex watch, and that Gambino had met the 42nd U.S. President, Bill Clinton, and his wife, Hillary Clinton, in a parking garage in Washington, as Gambino was seeking a Presidential Pardon for his father, as Rosario Gambino was serving a 45-year prison sentence since December 1984 for heroin smuggling. In around 2000, Gambino was promoted the position of official underboss for the family. The Los Angeles Police Department identified Gambino and former Colombo family soldier, Dominic Montemarano, as business partners in a payphone company called Progressive Telecom since at least 1998. During the early 2000s, Gambino was accused of operating an ecstasy trafficking ring with Derek Galanis, Louis Alba, Mark Forrester and Gambino had allegedly financed the drug operation. Following the death of former LA family boss, Peter Milano, in April 2012, Gambino had allegedly succeeded him as the new and current boss of the Los Angeles family. In September 2015, Gambino and his wife began the wine brand called Gambino Prosecco, the Gambino Prosecco wine brand had established tastings and events in Los Angeles, such celebrities as Patricia Arquette and Tony Bennett had given positive feedback, and in 2022, Gambino and several other investors, including former Colombo family capo, Michael Franzese had launched different wine brands. During the 2010s, Gambino supervised several inductions from the Canada based families to the Los Angeles family, including Albert Iavarone, whom was killed in September 2018, and Paolo Caputo, who was gunned down in August 2019. As of 2026, Gambino splits his time between California, Italy and Massachusetts, where he owns holiday homes.

=== Soldiers ===
- Louis "Little Man" Caruso (born January 23, 1957) — former capo and current soldier. Caruso may have had been brought into the LA family during the late 1980s by Carmen Milano. According to information by Kenji Gallo, Caruso was not a soldier or a capo by the early 1990s. By August 1993, Caruso relocated to West Hills in Los Angeles and served as a bagman for Carmen and Peter Milano and also relayed messages for them to other criminal underworld figures. It is believed Caruso became a capo by 1995 and in his crew was Tommaso "Tommy" Gambino, the future boss of the LA family by 2012, and also including Louis Dennis Alba, Giovan "John" Branco and Dominic Spinale in his crew. In around the mid-1990s, Caruso was employed at the Sea Breeze Distribution business along with Los Angeles family associate, Michael Gelfuso, which was owned by Carmine Milano, in addition to this business, Caruso was also involved in a limousine and dry-cleaning business. In around June 1995, Caruso, John Branco, Tommy Gambino, Jimmy Caci, Ori Spado and Stephen Cino were involved in a sit-down reputedly over a table at the Club Paradise bar in Las Vegas engaging with Branco and Caruso. Caci allegedly left the bar as Gambino and Caruso arrived to the meeting with two bikers, and later Caci, Gambino and Caruso met at the Walter's Deli in Beverly Hills to resolve the dispute which resulted in Gambino being assaulted by Caci, the dispute was never solved. In around 1996, Caruso and Peter Milano were involved in a dispute with John "Jackie" D'Amico and Michael "Mikey Scars" DiLeonardo, two capos from the New York based Gambino family; D'Amico had served as a capo under former Gambino family boss, John Gotti, and later as the street boss of the family before dying in December 2023, and DiLeonardo defected as a government witness in late 2002, and current Gambino family soldier, Joe Isgro, as Milano was accused of scamming thousands of dollars from Isgro within a business deal, which Caruso later paid the debt. According to FBI informant, Ori Spado, Gambino and Caruso had proposed Spado for membership into the LA family in June 1996, however Spado was ousted by Jimmy Caci and Kenji Gallo as he was accused of speaking and cooperating with law enforcement. John Branco, an associate in his crew, later became an informant in September 1996 and according to information from Branco, Caruso received 6000 dollars and jewellery from the home of Herbert Blitzstein, whom was murdered in January 1997. In April 1997, Caruso was indicted along with Stephen Cino and Buffalo family soldier, Robert Panaro, on charges of racketeering and murder. LA family underboss, Carmen Milano, began cooperating in May 1997 and identified Caruso as a soldier in the family. In April 1999, Caruso pled guilty to mail fraud, racketeering conspiracy and receiving stolen property, he was sentenced to 2 years in prison in August 1999 and was released in April 2001.
- Michael "Porno Mike" Esposito (born June 8, 1945) — current soldier. Esposito was born in East Harlem, New York, his father, Salvatore Esposito, was associated with the New York based Lucchese family, and was close to former Lucchese family boss, Anthony "Tony Ducks" Corallo, reputedly serving as his driver. In June 1976, Esposito relocated to California, from his former residence in Long Island, New York, and became involved in the pornography business, and became associated with Raymond "Rocky" DeRosa. In 1980, Esposito had attended a meeting with Mike Rizzitello, DeRosa, John DiMattia and John Branco at the Tiffany Club over a dispute between pornographers Martin Krause and Harvey "Ross" Rosenthal, after Krause refused to pay Rosenthal $15,000 over a debt. In 1981 and 1982, his friend, DeRosa, was indicted for operating a drug trafficking ring, Esposito however was not indicted even though he had played a major role distributing heroin, oxycodone and cocaine that had operated across California, New England and New York. In 1982, LA family capo, Rizzitello and Craig Fiato, whom later became an informant and witness, had begun extorting Walter Stevens with the assistance of the Mexican Mafia, and reached out to Esposito for protection, Esposito allegedly reacted with anger and reportedly had mentioned several names to Fiato to harm him over the extortion of Stevens, including Colombo family associate, Louis Peraino, San Francisco associate, Salvatore Amarena, and Ronald "Ronnie Rome" Romanowski. Later on, Esposito was assaulted at his office by Carl Cataldo and Steven Munichiello, who were hired from Fiato to give him a beating. In around mid-1984, Esposito was assaulted in Chicago by Lucchese family members, imprisoned Lucchese-New Jersey capo, Martin Taccetta, and former Lucchese family soldier, Robert "Bucky" Caravaggio, over an argument from the videotape distribution business that Esposito was partnered in with the Lucchese family. Esposito was subpoenaed twice in April and July 1985, however he refused to testify, regarding an investigation into the Lucchese family interests in New York and New Jersey. By the late 1980s, Esposito had been transferred from the Lucchese family to the Los Angeles family. Kenji Gallo, former Colombo family and Los Angeles family associate, notified that Esposito had connections within the New York based Bonanno family, in particular with Thomas Sinopoli, Louis Peraino and Patsy Peraino. During the 90s, Esposito became affiliated with Jerry Zimmerman and John "Sonny" Franzese. Esposito may have had been inducted into the LA family along with Anthony Gambino, and Tommaso Gambino, Tommaso would later replace Peter Milano in 2012 as the current boss of the LA family, and around about this time, Esposito was associated with Vincent "Vinnie the Duplicator" DeStefano, Russell Hampshire and Joseph Abinant. Esposito currently resides in New Jersey.
- Anthony Gambino — soldier and brother of Tommaso Gambino
- Russell J. "Rusty" Masetta (born October 23, 1952) — soldier. Masetta was elected business agent for Teamsters Local 416 in Cleveland in 1979. After marrying Antoinette Milano, the daughter of Los Angeles family boss Peter Milano, Masetta became an organizer for Teamsters Local 848 in El Monte. He was indicted along with capo Luigi Gelfuso and charged with extortion conspiracy after accepting a bribe from an undercover FBI agent posing as a Hollywood producer seeking approval to make a motion picture using non-union film crews. On June 27, 1988, Masetta pleaded guilty to a misdemeanor conspiracy charge. He returned to Cleveland after serving four months in jail.
- Leonard "Limping Lenny" Montana Jr. — soldier
- Robert "Fat Bobby" Paduano (born October 15, 1942) — soldier. In 1950, Paduano lived in Brentwood, New York on Long Island, with his father as a car mechanic. In 1972, Paduano relocated to California located on 18701 Dina Place in Cerritos and by April 1976, Paduano was a registered operator for the Electronics Unlimited company based on Pacific Street in Fountain Valley. In 1973, Paduano was convicted for arson, and in 1977, he was convicted of cocaine conspiracy. According to organized crime files in 1978, Paduano was an associate in the Colombo family from New York and affiliated with Felice Vizzari and Ralph D’Angelo, reportedly Vizzari was a member of the John "Sonny" Franzese crew and D'Angelo was previously associated with Joe "Crazy Joey" Gallo, Paduano also currently has close ties to the Bonanno family from New York. By 1979, Paduano had engaged in loansharking and partnered with William "Bill" Carroll-Heldman. By the early 1980s, Paduano was in the crew belonging to LA family capo, Michael Rizzitello. In January 1981, Paduano was arrested for loansharking, and was released on $25,000 bail, Paduano was represented by lawyer Anthony Brooklier in February 1981, the son of LA family boss, Dominic Brooklier, according to media reports, it was described as the first loansharking prosecution based in Orange County since 1932, and Paduano was acquitted in May 1981. It is believed Paduano was proposed for membership by Rizzitello in mid-1985, at the ceremony present were Carmen Milano, Peter Milano, Charles Caci, Jimmy Caci and Louie Gelfuso. Jimmy Caci and Charles Caci managed to end the induction ceremony citing Paduano's involvement in drug trafficking. By January 1986, Paduano was allegedly controlling a cocaine ring which targeted and extorted local drug dealers in Orange County. He was arrested along with many members in the late 1980s when he was accused of trying to take over the narcotic trafficking in Newport Beach. As of 2026, Paduano splits his time between Florida and California.
- Michael "Sportsbar Mike" Russo — soldier

=== Associates ===
- Dominic Anthony "Dicky Boy" Spinale (born June 28, 1936) — associate. Spinale is an associate of the Los Angeles and Patriarca families. He was involved in gambling and bookmaking with the Angiulo brothers in Boston and later partnered with another Patriarca associate, Edward "Eddie" DeLeo, in Las Vegas. In 1987, Spinale was indicted along with DeLeo, Donato Angiulo, Thomas Palladino and Matthew Bamonte. Spinale was convicted of relaying betting information from Las Vegas to Boston, and was added to the Nevada casino "Black Book" in 1994. In 1996, he became involved in a scheme to sell fake diamonds with Herbert Blitzstein and Peter Vincent Caruso. On February 2, 1998, Spinale was among six mobsters indicted on federal racketeering charges following a two-year FBI investigation into Las Vegas rackets. He was implicated in the investigation by Los Angeles family underboss Carmen Milano, who had turned FBI informant. Spinale pleaded guilty on March 9, 2000 to racketeering charges involving the failed diamond scheme and a 1995 car insurance scam. He was released from federal prison on March 14, 2002.
- Scotty Gelt — associate. Gelt is an associate of the Los Angeles family and the grandson of Benjamin "Bugsy" Siegel. He was involved with the 1994 Arizona State University (ASU) basketball point shaving scandal.

== Former members ==
- Angelo Polizzi (born on May 17, 1913) — former capo during the 1960s and 1970s. Polizzi was born in Buffalo, New York, and his family hailed from Sicily, before his accession within the LA family, he was initially affiliated with the Buffalo-Magaddino family, the Polizzi family resided on 119 Efner Street in Buffalo whilst Polizzi was a child, and by 1920, the Polizzi family lived on 410 Allen St in Jamestown. In November 1935, Polizzi was arrested along with Daniel Sansanese and Joseph Gatti for an armed robbery near 301 Bryant Street, reportedly, Sansanese was a soldier in the Magaddino family, Polizzi had pleaded not guilty and in March 1936, he was sentenced to at least 10 years in prison, by April 1940, he was incarcerated at the Wallkill State Prison in Shawangunk, New York, he was released in 1942. By 1942, he was registered as employed at the Connecticut Fire Brick Company on Tonawanda Street. Polizzi had served in the U.S. Army from between 1943 and 1945. By late 1950, Polizzi resided in California, and that he was accused of being the shooter in the December 1950 murder of Samuel Rummel on Laurel Canyon Boulevard by using a shotgun, an attorney for Mickey Cohen, a crime boss in Los Angeles, the murder was alleged to have had been ordered by Jack Dragna, and was supervised by Aladena "Jimmy the Weasel" Fratianno and Nicolo "Nick" Licata. In August 1951, it is believed that Polizzi had served as the driver for Jimmy Fratianno after he had murdered Anthony Brancato and Anthony Trombino on Hollywood Boulevard. In October 1951, Polizzi was brought in for questioning and was picked up at his home address located on 519 E Windsor Rd in Glendale. By 1952, Polizzi was inducted as a formal member of the Los Angeles family along with Joseph Adamo, Charles Battaglia, Joseph Dippolito, Carlo Licata and Joseph LiMandri. In July 1952, Polizzi married Concetta Matranga in San Bernardino, California. In June 1955, Polizzi was arrested for an unknown charge. According to information by Jimmy Fratianno, Polizzi had participated in the June 1960 murder of James Delmont whom was bludgeoned to death. By 1963, Polizzi was promoted to the position of capo, by LA family boss, Frank DeSimone, members of the Polizzi crew included Anthony "Nino" Mangione, James "Danny Wilson" Iannone, Salvatore Piscopo and Dominic "Mimi" Tripoli. He died in June 1988.
- Joseph Adamo — former capo based in San Diego. Adamo was born on November 21, 1902. Adamo arrived in New York from Palermo in December 1913 and lived in Brooklyn located on 158 Utica Avenue, and between 1922 and 1924, he had resided in Illinois in Chicago. In June 1933, Adamo married Marie Greco in Southern Colorado, her family hailed from Trapani and Tunis. In 1935, according to the FBN, Adamo was convicted on a liquor violation charge. In August 1941, Adamo was convicted for bookmaking in Los Angeles, and was later sentenced to 4 years in prison, 2 years of probation and fined $200. In September 1950, Adamo was sentenced to 10 months in jail for assault after he had stabbed Germano "Gigi" Nelli during a bar fight in Santa Cruz, California. In December 1951, Adamo, along with Tony Mirabile, Benny Bonventre and Carlo Licata, may have had participated in the murder of Frank Borgia, from the order of Jimmy Fratianno and Frank Bompensiero, Adamo was allegedly responsible for disposing of the body of Borgia. In 1952, Adamo was inducted into the Los Angeles family, alongside Charles Battaglia, Joseph Dippolito, Joseph LiMandri, Angelo Polizzi, Calogero "Carlo" Licata, and Jimmy Fratianno was promoted to the position of capo at this ceremony, Adamo may have been put into the San Diego crew headed by Frank Bompensiero. According to a Mob informant in July 1959, Adamo was given $10,000 by Anthony Mirabile to purchase bootleg whiskey for bars in San Diego. According to the FBN, Adamo was elevated to the position of capo in 1959 or 1960, in charge of the San Diego crew and rackets, and was known to have supervised two clubs with Los Angeles family associate, Peter Montana, Adamo was formally identified as the crew leader by the FBI in July 1964, and was surveilled by the FBI in February 1965 as a frequent visitor to the home belonging to LA family boss, Frank DeSimone. In June 1967, former LA family capo, Frank Bompensiero, was an FBI informant and notified to the FBI that Adamo discussed a conspiracy of murder and the extortion of Nick Simponis. He died in July 1998.
- Anthony Mangione (born November 28, 1900) — former soldier. Mangione was born in Sicily and later arrived to New York City by the S.S. Colombo boat in July 1923, and settled into lower Manhattan, then later into Cleveland located on 2614 East 9th Street in Downtown Cleveland. In 1924 or 1925, Mangione became an inducted member of the Cleveland family. According to the writings of Nicola Gentile in 1963, the father of Mangione was shot and killed in Italy for cooperating with law enforcement. In December 1933, Mangione married Maria Concetta Romano, the daughter of Giuseppe "Dr. Joe" Romano, a Cleveland family member. By April 1940, Mangione settled into Kansas City located on 6624 The Paseo, and he is believed to transferred his membership to the Kansas City family, which was headed by Charles Binaggio at the time. In 1944, Mangione owned the Quaff Buffet restaurant and bar at 601 Main St, and as well was an employee of the K.C. Distributing Company located on 3309 Troost Ave. In July 1949, Mangione sold his restaurant to Kansas City family member, Antonio Bonino, for $10,000. By 1953, Mangione relocated to Los Angeles in California, and he is believed to have joined the Los Angeles family, which at the time was headed by Jack Dragna, and by February 1961, he had lived at 2575 Woodlyn Rd in Pasadena, and was a business partner with Alfonso Veneziano, involved in a pizzeria located on 136 West 8th St in Central Los Angeles. In July 1969, Mangione suffered from a heart attack and was essentially "retired". He died in October 1979.
- Pietro "Peter" Andrade — former soldier (1920s–?)
- Charles "Charley Bats" Battaglia — former soldier (1953–1983)
- John Louis "The Bat" Battaglia — former soldier. Brother of Charles (1956–1970s)
- Biaggio Bonventre — former soldier in San Diego (1940s–1950s)
- Dominic Brooklier (born December 16, 1913) — former boss. Brooklier's family hailed from Palermo. Brooklier was born in Detroit, and later became an associate for the Detroit Mafia. In the 1930s, Brooklier was sentenced to 9 years in prison for armed robbery. He had first met Jimmy Fratianno, the later acting boss for the LA family, in the Ohio State Penitentiary sometime during the late 1930s or early 1940s. In March 1945, Brooklier married to Frances McBride, and they later relocated to Los Angeles by April 1946, Brooklier was associated with Mickey Cohen around this time. Yonnie Licavoli had advised Fratianno and Brooklier to move to California and both had agreed. In around 1947, Brooklier along with Fratianno, Louis Tom Dragna, Salvatore Piscopo and Salvatore “Charles” Dippolito were inducted in the Los Angeles family at a winery located on 6415 Compton Avenue, which was managed by two LA family soldiers, Giovanni Cascio and Thomas Palermo, also attended were Jack Dragna, Girolamo Adamo and Tom Dragna, the administration of the family, and it is believed that Fratianno had poached Brooklier from Mickey Cohen. According to information by informant and LA family capo, Frank Bompensiero, Brooklier was proposed for membership by Fratianno and that he was inducted in the LA family by 1948 or 1949, and that Brooklier was brought into California by Cohen. In June 1948, Brooklier was arrested during a gambling raid, along with John Fields and Gordon Erwin, and he was released two weeks later. Shortly after Brooklier was made into a member of the LA family, he and Fratianno were reputedly involved in bookmaking and loansharking as business partners. In June 1949, Brooklier accompanied Fratianno to the house of Cohen where he served as a lookout as Fratianno planted an explosive at Cohen's house. In July 1949, Brooklier and Arthur DiMaria shot gunfire to Cohen, however they had only managed to wound Edward "Neddie" Herbert, one of Cohen's associates. In May 1956, Brooklier was arrested for the extortion of Orange County contractor Santo Tedesco, for the sum of $50,000, the charge was later dropped. According to information by informant and former LA family soldier, Salvatore "Dago Louis" Piscopo, he had identified Brooklier as a soldier by July 1964. In 1967, Brooklier became a capo of the Joseph Dippolito crew after Dippolito was promoted to the position of underboss. It is believed Brooklier became the acting underboss in 1972, and became the official underboss in 1974 following the death of Joseph Dippolito in January 1974. In July 1974, Brooklier was indicted alongside Samuel Sciortino, Peter Milano, Frank Stellino and several other affiliates were indicted for racketeering, conspiracy and for the extortion of Southern California bookmakers, loansharks and pornographers. In April 1975, Brooklier was sentenced to 20 months in prison at the FCI Terminal Island, Brooklier had suffered a heart attack shortly after his sentencing, and was released in October 1976. In February 1978, Brooklier was indicted on charges of murder, racketeering, conspiracy and extortion, and was sentenced to 4 years in prison in January 1981. In May 1978, Brooklier was identified as the boss of the family, according to organized crime files. He died in July 1984.
- Charles "Bobby Milano" Caci (born October 16, 1936) — former soldier. Caci was born in Buffalo, New York, and his parents were of Sicilian and Palermo descent, and resided in Buffalo's West Village on 82nd 10th Street. By the 1960s, Caci was associated with the Magaddino family from Buffalo, New York. In June 1967, Caci along with Frederico Randaccio, Pasquale Natarelli and Stephen Cino were indicted for conspiracy of armed robbery, and was sentenced to 10 years in prison. In June 1985, Caci was identified by the FBI as a member of the Los Angeles family, and was possibly sponsored for membership by his elder brother and LA family capo, Jimmy Caci. In May 1987, Caci and his brother, Jimmy Caci, along with Peter Milano, Carmen Milano, Luigi Gelfuso Jr., Stephen Cino and Bonanno family soldier, Arthur "Artie" Franconeri, were arrested as part of an 18-count federal racketeering indictment for charges including conducting a corrupt organization, conspiracy, extortion, obstruction of justice, and cocaine distribution, and in May 1988, Caci was sentenced to 1 year in prison for conspiracy to commit extortion. In February 1998, Caci was indicted for extortion, fraud, murder conspiracy and money laundering, and in January 2001, Caci pled guilty to racketeering conspiracy, and was sentenced to 4 months of house arrest. He died in January 2006.
- Vincent Dominic "Jimmy" Caci (born 1 August 1925) — former capo. Caci was first associated with the Buffalo family, and was heavily involved in the vending machine business. In 1972, Caci was sentenced to 3 years in prison for conspiracy to blow up a vending machine company. According to information by Kenji Gallo, Caci at one time was offered membership into the Rochester family, the Bufalino family and the Buffalo family, however he had denied the proposals. In the mid-1970s, Caci moved to California, and by 1978, he was identified by the California’s Organized Crime Control Commission as an associate of LA family capo, Michael "Mike Rizzi" Rizzitello. In 1975, Caci's brother, Charles "Bobby Milano" Caci, married musician, Keely Smith, singer Frank Sinatra was among the wedding attendees. By the late 1970s and early 1980s, Caci was inducted as a member into the Los Angeles family inside of a hotel room in Palm Springs. By 1984, Caci was promoted to the position of capo by Peter Milano. Following the indictment in 1987, which targeted Milano and several other affiliates, Caci was made the street boss for Peter Milano. In October 1992, Caci was indicted for the plot to bribe a Las Vegas stagehands union official, the President of the International Alliance of Theatrical Stage Employees, along with Stephen Cino, Gambino capo Natale "Big Chris" Richichi, his son Salvatore, and Kenneth "Ken" Guarino, Caci was sentenced to 6 months in prison. In August 1996, Caci was sentenced to 42 months in prison for wire fraud, conspiracy and interstate transportation of fraudulently obtained money for his role in a telemarketing scheme. During the 1990s, Caci's crew members consisted of John "Fat Johnny" Lantino, Kenny "Kenji" Gallo, Orlando "Ori" Spado, Vincent "Vince Lupo" Arcuri, Robert "Puggy" Zeichick and Stephen Mauriello; Spado and Mauriello later cooperated with the government. He died in August 2011.
- Stephen Anthony "Steve the Whale" Cino — former capo. Cino was born on October 29, 1936. Originally from Buffalo, New York and a member of the Buffalo family. Cino has an arrest record dating back to 1962 which includes robbery, extortion, bank fraud and bribing a union official. Switched to the Los Angeles family and was put in the Nevada Black Book in 1997. In April 1997, Cino was indicted on murder charges relating to the January 1997 murder of Herbie Blitzstein, an associate of the Chicago Mafia, Cino was among the 12 other defendants charged with racketeering, murder, mail fraud, counterfeiting and money laundering. Cino and Buffalo family member, Robert Panaro, was acquitted for the Blitzstein murder in May 1999, however Cino was sentenced in August 1999 to 15 years in prison for extortion. Cino was released in 2008. He died in March 2013.
- Salvatore Charles "Charlie Dip" Dippolito — former soldier. Father of Joseph Dippolito (1947–1961)
- Ronnie Costa — former soldier. Originally from Patriarca crime family in New England (1990s–?)
- Frank Paul "One Eye" Dragna — former soldier. Son of Jack Dragna (1950s–?)
- Louis Tom Dragna — former capo (1961–1980s)
- Luigi "Louie" Gelfuso Jr. (born August 7, 1925) — former capo. Gelfuso was born in Providence and his parents hailed from Lazio, his father may had have been an associate of the Patriarca family. By 1950, Gelfuso moved to Los Angeles, where he was a bartender at the Five O’Clock Club in Burbank, California, owned by Nicolo "Old Man" Licata, whom transferred from the Detroit family and later became the boss of the Los Angeles family from the late 1960s until his death in October 1974, around about this time Gelfuso was heavily involved in illegal gambling and racketeering with LA family associate, Louis Visco. During the early 1950s, Gelfuso married Martha Regina Noggle-Townsend, and had a son named Michael Gelfuso in 1951, whom later became an associate of the Los Angeles family from the early 1970s until his death in 2000. In August 1951, Gelfuso was arrested in connection of the murders of Anthony Brancato and Anthony Trombino, James Fratianno and Charles Battaglia had murdered the men. During the late 1950s, Gelfuso became associated with Peter Milano, whom would later rule the family for almost 30 years. According to an informant, Gelfuso had met with LA family boss, Frank DeSimone, in January 1967, concerning an entertainment license being sought by Frank Sica, for his Sir Sico restaurant in Sun Valley, which had cost him $10,000 for the license. In early 1968, Gelfuso lived in Studio City, Los Angeles, located on 12360 Riverside Drive. In May 1968, Gelfuso was arrested for assault and extortion along with Richard Caroleo and Jack Cowan Fronte, and was acquitted in February 1969, however he was rearrested in February in connection with the September 1968 murder of Biaggio "William" Amato, he pleaded not guilty in March 1969 and was acquitted in April 1969. According to the Organized Crime Control Commission in California in 1978, Gelfuso was alleged to have attempted to take control of the waste management in California during the late 1960s, and that Gelfuso had been arrested twice in 1969 for illegal gambling conspiracy and possession of marijuana. In November 1973, Gelfuso was arrested for illegal gambling along with Peter Milano, Michael Gelfuso, John Vaccaro Jr., Santo Manfre, Anthony Endreola and Harry "The Greek" Coloduros. John DuBeck began cooperating with the Los Angeles Strike Force Against Organized Crime in relation to illegal gambling, and in March 1974, DuBeck and his wife were shot and killed. Gelfuso was convicted in September 1974 and began his sentence in 1977, with Gelfuso whom was sentenced to 4 years in prison at FCI Terminal Island, he was released in June 1979. Gelfuso had married Penny Perkins upon his release from prison in June 1979. In 1983, Gelfuso was inducted as a soldier into the Los Angeles family, and was elevated to the position of capo in March 1984, with notable crew affiliates consisting of John Vaccaro, Rocky DeRosa, Russell Masetta, Albert Jesus Nunez, John "DeMatte" DiMattia, Michael Gelfuso, Robert "Bob" Kessler and Robert Ralph D’Agostino. In March 1984, Gelfuso was taped by informant, Craig Fiato, at the Melting Pot restaurant on Ventura Boulevard, and later in April 1984, Gelfuso and Fiato met again, where Gelfuso received $2000 from Fiato and discussed the extortion of Spike McShane. In May 1984, Gelfuso had ordered Fiato and LA family associate, Bob Kessler, to assault New England family associate, Daniel Mondavano. In July 1984, Gelfuso and Albert Nunez participated in the assault and extortion of Lenny Bayden for $5000. In June 1985, the FBI officially identified Gelfuso as a capo. In April 1988, from the testimony of Craig Fiato, Gelfuso pled guilty to cocaine distribution and extortion, and was sentenced to 10 years in prison, he was released from prison in April 1993. Upon the release of Gelfuso, he was the unofficial underboss and consigliere for the family while managing street activities for the family throughout the 1990s. During the early or mid-1990s, Gelfuso became associated with Kenji Gallo, the former associate for the New York based Colombo family and also the LA family, Gallo and Gelfuso were heavily involved in debt collection, extortion and stolen goods. In 1996, Gelfuso arranged a meeting with Paul Clyde Villano, the boss of the Colorado family, over shared interests in a Las Vegas hotel, Jimmy Caci, Stephen Cino and Kenji Gallo also attended the meeting. Following the release of a FBI tape which Orlando Spado was overheard having a discussion with an FBI agent in a cooperative manner, Gelfuso wished to murder Spado, with LA family associate, Vince Arcuri, suggesting to Gelfuso to enlist the help of Armenian gangster Arshak "Tony" Kazarian to murder Spado, it is believed during a meeting with Gelfuso and LA family boss, Peter Milano, the meeting was decided that Spado would not be met with violence. In 1999 or 2000, Gelfuso had complained to Kenji Gallo and LA family associate, Anthony "Big Tony Sposato, that he was suffering from back pain, which later was diagnosed to be cancer. He died in October 2000.
- James "Danny Wilson" Iannone (born January 1, 1914) — former soldier. Iannone was born in New York, his father was from Molise in Southern Italy. In 1930, Iannone was arrested for auto theft. In May 1932, Iannone was arrested for burglary. In December 1932, Iannone was arrested for robbery and was sentenced to 5 years in prison, he was released in February 1934. In 1935, Iannone was arrested twice for robbery and extortion. In November 1937, Iannone shot and killed Hymie Miller, and was arrested in March 1940. By the late 1930s, Iannone was associated with Mickey Cohen. Iannone had served as a staff sergeant in WW2 and was stationed in the Philippines. In January 1946, Iannone married Lorraine Cross. In September 1947, Iannone was arrested for robbery. By the late 1940s, it is believed Iannone was inducted into the Los Angeles family. In November 1948, Iannone was arrested as a suspect for the assault of William Petroff, who had been severely assaulted by Iannone and Joseph Sisca in August 1948. Iannone was arrested at least twice in the late 1940s for illegal gambling charges. Iannone was arrested for the February 1950 murder of Abraham Davidian, Davidian was killed as he had cooperated against Iannone's friend, Joseph Sisca and his brother Alfred Sisca, for involvement in narcotics. By 1952, Iannone was a member in the crew headed by Jimmy Fratianno. Iannone was called upon by the McClellan Committee and refused to testify. Jimmy Fratianno was convicted of extortion in 1954, and prior to his conviction, Iannone was indicted for the attempted extortion of a gambling club based in Culver City, Milwaukee family associate, Raymond "Whitey" Christl, testified about the attempted extortion, Iannone was reputedly heavily involved in bookmaking and active in Los Angeles, Palm Springs in California and in Las Vegas. In 1962, informant Harry Hall, had notified the FBI that Theodore "Sugar" Brown had met with Iannone about using Joe DiMaggio’s name to promote his garbage disposal business, the Bus Boy Disposers Incorporated, based in North Hollywood, and that Iannone had wished to become involved in a helicopter ambulance service. In the late 1960s, Iannone along with Fratianno, Abe Benjamin and John Roselli, were involved in a business venture concerning a coin-operated horse racing machine. Iannone, from the information and testimony from informant Craig Fiato, was heavily involved in illegal gambling and loansharking during the 1970s. He died in April 2002.
- Dominic Longo — former soldier (1970s–1985)
- Marco LiMandri — former soldier in San Diego (1930s–?)
- Joseph LiMandri — former soldier in San Diego. Son of Marco (1940s–1970s)
- Frank Isador "Big Frank" Matranga — former capo in Orange County (1960s–1969)
- Gaspare Matranga — former soldier in San Diego (1930s–?)
- Joseph Ernest Matranga — former soldier in San Diego. Brother of Gaspare (1950s–?)
- Frank Isador "Big Frank" Matranga — former soldier in San Diego. Cousin of Matranga brothers (1940s–1970s)
- Peter John Milano (born December 22, 1925) — former boss. Milano was born in Cleveland, and his father was of Calabrian descent. Milano's family extended to his cousins and members of the Cleveland family, in particular with relations to John Nardi, whom was killed in May 1977, and Nicholas Anthony Nardi, whom died in 2014, Milano was also related to San Jose family soldier, Stefano "Big Steve" Zoccoli, who died in 1976. In the 1950s, Milano was heavily involved in illegal gambling with the Los Angeles family, as well as Micky Cohen and his crew. According to Jimmy Fratianno, who later became the acting boss of the LA family, as well as an informant by 1977, had notified that Milano and his father were one of Fratianno's earliest contacts within the illegal gambling business, with Milano who first met Fratianno in 1949. In the early 1960s, Milano was the owner of the Roman Candle Bar located on 5571 Sepulveda Boulevard, in Culver City, and the bar had become the headquarters and a front for illegal gambling. In around 1968, Milano was proposed for membership with Samuel Sciortino, Sciortino was later the underboss for the family during the later part of the 1970s, and by 1970, Milano became a formally inductd member of the family, and from information by Fratianno, he had identified Milano as a capo by March 1974, likely succeeding Dominic Brooklier following Brooklier's promotion to official underboss of the family, Milano's crew members consisted of Frank Stellino, Michael Gelfuso, Luigi Gelfuso Jr., John Vaccaro Jr., Raymond "Rocky" DeRosa, Santo Albert Manfre, Tony Endreol and Vincent Caci. According to information from informants, Milano was introduced to Teamsters President, Frank Fitzsimmons, the successor to Jimmy Hoffa, in February 1973, located at the Mission Hills Country Club in Palm Springs, allegedly through a contact affiliated with Chicago Mafia associate, Allen Dorfman, also attended were Sam Sciortino and Joseph LiMandri, the puropose of the meeting was regarding racketeering related to healthcare and dental plans. In August 1974, Milano along with Louie Gelfuso, John Vaccaro and Martin Calaway were convicted of illegal gambling from the testimony of Harry "The Greek" Coloduros, two Las Vegas casino employees, John DuBeck and Frances DuBeck, were scheduled to make an appearance at court and testify, however both had been murdered by a shotgun blast in March 1974, the DuBeck family have had been murdered by Chicago Outfit enforcer, Anthony Spilotro, or by John Vaccaro and Louie Gelfuso. In June 1975, Milano was sentenced to 4 years in prison for extortion, racketeering and narcotics, and he was released in March 1978. By the late 1970s, Milano had resided to 3355 S. Allegheny Court, Westlake Village in California, and by this time Milano had interests in a bail bondsmen service, a trading company and a vending machine business. By Fratianno's cooperate in December 1977, Milano was believed to have been elevated to the position of acting boss for the family, and Milano had reopened the recruitment into the LA family in 1983, by June 1985, Milano was the official boss of the family. In May 1988, Milano was sentenced to 6 years in prison for racketeering, illegal gambling, loansharking and narcotics, he was released in April 1991, Milano had been doing his time along with former Colombo family capo, Michael Franzese, at FCI Terminal Island. In the early 1990s, Milano oversaw the induction of former Lucchese family associate, Michael Esposito, and Gambino family associates, brothers, Tommaso Gambino and Anthony Gambino, the sons of Gambino family soldier, Rosario Gambino. In 1995, William D’Elia, the boss of the Bufalino family, which was based in Pennsylvania, organised a meeting with Milano and Pittsburgh family members, Henry "Zebo" Zottola, Lenine Strollo and John Bazzano, concerning their family’s interest in the Rincon River Oaks Casino. In 1995 or 1996, Milano was accused of stealing $40,000 from Gambino family soldier, Joe Isgro, Gambino family capos, John "Jackie" D'Amico and Michael "Mikey Scars" DiLeonardo had travelled from New York to California to resolve the dispute, Milano had been introduced to DiLeonardo in New York through former Gambino family capo, Joseph "Joe G from the Bronx" Gambino, it is believed the dispute was never solved and Milano never gave back Isgro any of his money, instead one of Milano's capos, Louis "Little Man" Caruso, paid the debt. He died in April 2012.
- Anthony "Tony" Mirabile — former capo in San Diego (1956–1958)
- Salvatore James Pinelli — former soldier. Pinelli was born in Chicago on January 9, 1927, and later was inducted into the Chicago Mafia and became a capo overseeing the rackets in Indiana. By April 1950, Pinelli married Concetta Amari, the daughter of Filippo Amari, the boss of the New Jersey based DeCavalcante family from between the 1920s until his death in 1956. In around 1952 or 1953, Pinelli was a registered legal employee of a hotel business located on 5920 Hollywood Boulevard, and in December 1956, Pinelli and his brother, Anthony Pinelli, opened a liquor store after their liquor license application was approved in November 1956. In 1957, Frank DeSimone became the new boss of the LA family, replacing Jack Dragna, Anthony Pinelli, the brother of Salvatore, was reputedly a close associate of DeSimone. By the late 1950s, Pinelli had moved to the Los Angeles County located on 911 Balboa Drive in Arcadia. By 1965, Pinelli had transferred from the Chicago Outfit to the Los Angeles family, and by the early to mid-1970s, Pinelli was inducted as a soldier into the LA family. In December 1977, former LA family acting boss, Jimmy "the Weasel" Fratianno, became a government witness and identified Pinelli as a member of the LA family to the FBI, and by Pinelli's final years, he had relocated to Laguna Hills in Orange County in 2000 before dying in March 2001.
- Salvatore "Dago Louie" Piscopo — former soldier (1947–1970s)
- Thomas Ricciardi (born September 12, 1931) — former soldier. Ricciardi's family hailed from Campania. In 1950, Ricciardi resided in Brooklyn and was a longshoreman. In 1951, Ricciardi had married Marie Victoria Bencivenga-Marotta. By the late 1950s, Ricciardi was associated with the New York based Profaci-Colombo family, and during the early 1960s of the Gallo-Profaci war, Ricciardi was part of the Profaci faction. In 1962, Ricciardi was possibly convicted of larceny or armed robbery. In 1964, Ricciardi was again convicted of narcotics possession, and in 1969, Ricciardi was convicted of fraud. Ricciardi had relocated to Canoga Park in San Fernando sometime between the late 1960s and early 1970s. In June 1975, Jimmy Fratianno had complained to LA family boss, Louis Tom Dragna, that Ricciardi had attempted to extort $10,000 from Mickey Fine. By the late 1970s, Ricciardi was affiliated with Dominick "The Pig" Raffone, Michael "Big Mike" Rizzitello, Alfred Ponticelli, Ignazio Tony Descisciolo, Martin "Marty Allan" Allenstein and Raymond DeRosa. In around the late 1970s, Ricciardi and LA family soldier, Giacchino "Jack" Lo Cicero, were extorting pornographers and gambling in Los Angeles, during one instance, Ricciardi and Lo Cicero had extorted Theodore Gaswirth in August 1976 for the sum of $20,000, Gaswirth fled California and later became a witness. In February 1977, Ricciardi shot former LA family capo and informant, Frank Bompensiero, 4 times, effectively killing him, Bompensiero was killed inside of a public phone both on the sidewalk at the head of an alley running west from Lamont Street near Thomas and Reed avenues, near his home located on 4205 Lamont St., Apartment 7, in Pacific Beach of San Diego, California, it is believed Fratianno had called Bompensiero at the phone booth where he died, from Sal's Espresso Caffe belonging to former San Francisco family associate, Salvatore Amarena, Amarena had informed Fratianno of the murder at a restaurant in San Francisco owned by former American baseball player, John Montefusco, whilst Fratianno was at dinner with LA family associate, Frank "Skinny" Velotta. In March 1977, Ricciardi was inducted into the Los Angeles family, and his close associate, Jack Lo Cicero, was promoted to the position of consigliere around the same time as Ricciardi's induction. In May 1977, Ricciardi was formally introduced to Fratianno at Bobby’s Restaurant in Manhattan by LA family capo, Mike Rizzitello, and the topic of discussion was allegedly the murder of Bompensiero. In August 1977, Ricciardi met with Fratianno, Rizzitello and Milton Holt, the former Secretary-Treasurer of Teamsters Local 805, regarding a labour issue in Philadelphia that required assistance from Jackie Presser, the international Vice-President of the Teamsters, Ricciardi was also accompanied with Cleveland family associates, Raymond Ferritto and Arthur "Archie" Andreano, and met at the Ramada Inn located on 22115 Brookpark Road near the Cleveland airport to discuss the ongoing feud with Cleveland-Irish Mob gangster, Danny Greene. In November 1977, Ricciardi was indicted for the extortion of pornographers in California, and was released on $40,000 bail. In January 1978, Ricciardi was indicted for illegal gambling, alongside Rizzitello and Marty Allenstein, and he was again indicted in March 1978, Ricciardi was convicted in April 1978 and sentenced to 14 months in prison in May 1978. He died in February 1979.
- Michael "Mike Rizzi" Rizzitello (born March 29, 1927) — former capo. Rizzitello grew up in New Jersey and lived there since at least September 1943, and his family hailed from Calabria. Rizzitello first became associated with the Profaci-Colombo family based in New York, and was affiliated with Joe "Crazy Joey" Gallo and Larry Gallo; Larry died of cancer in May 1968 and Joe was gunned down in April 1972. Rizzitello's first arrest dated back to 1947. Rizzitello relocated to California and worked as a bartender at the Villa Capri restaurant located on 1735 N. McCadden Place, and was first associated with Los Angeles family soldier, Salvatore "Dago Louie" Piscopo, along with Louis Castiglione and John Fiato. In May 1958, Rizzitello married Theresa Serpico in Nevada, Las Vegas, and later had two children. According to information by Jimmy Fratianno, Rizzitello became a member of the Gallo crew, or the Colombo family headed by Gallo, as one of two bosses, in 1960, and in September 1961, Rizzitello and Castiglione had travelled to New York to assist Gallo in the Profaci-Colombo family war. Rizzitello and Salvatore Mangiameli were accused of murdering Profaci family soldier, John Guariglia, and Paul Ricci, in November 1961, at the Hi-Fi Lounge bar located on 7202 13th Avenue in Brooklyn, New York, Joe Gallo was convicted of conspiracy and extortion, possibly days or weeks after the Guariglia-Ricci murders, and Rizzitello returned to California with Castiglione. According to informants, Rizzitello and Anthony Zurica were sent to Los Angeles by the Gallo crew. In December 1962, Rizzitello, Castiglione and Zurica were sentenced to 9 years in prison for robbery and kidnapped, he was released in November 1971, whilst in prison, Rizzitello had met Mexican Mafia member, Joseph Morgan, William Heldman, and Robert "Fat Bobby" Paduano, whom later became a soldier in the LA family. According to information by Fratianno, Rizzitello had told him that he had murdered Bernard Gusoff in November 1974. Following Fratianno's promotion the position of acting underboss in 1975, Rizzitello had become one of Fratianno's cloest associates, handling the day-to-day operations in Los Angeles and in charge of the extortion, gambling and loansharking rackets, and later became acquainted with Chicago Mafia heavyweights, Anthony Spilotro and Sidney Korshak. In around May or June 1976, Rizzitello accompanied Fratianno to a meeting with Joseph Lombardo, Jackie Cerone, Anthony Accardo and Joey Aiuppa, the administration of the Chicago Mafia, concerning a dispute between Teamster officials Andy Anderson, the Vice President of the International Brotherhood of Teamsters, and Rudy Tham. Later on in 1976, Fratianno had met with Colombo family consigliere, Alphonse Persico, and Colombo family underboss, Anthony Abbatemarco, both men had urged Fratianno to induct Rizzitello into the Los Angeles family. In June 1976, Rizzitello was inducted as a soldier into the Los Angeles family, also attended were Louis Tom Dragna, Fratianno and Frank Bompensiero. Shortly after his induction, he became a capo for the family. Following the discovery of Fratianno's status as an informant, Rizzitello was given the contract to murder Fratianno by LA family boss, Dominic Brooklier, and underboss, Samuel Sciortino, he was also given the task to extort Las Vegas gangster, Morris Dalitz, on behalf of the Chicago Mafia. In 1977, Rizzitello was indicted for extortion, and in May 1977, he was sentenced to 3 years in prison. By the late 1970s, Rizzitello's crew consisted of Mike Comparetti, Jack Fineberg, John Branco, Robert Paduano, Milton Mende, Rocco Passanante Kenneth Paladino. In January 1978, Rizzitello was indicted for extortion, and he was again indicted in February 1978 for extortion, racketeering, and obstruction of justice, Rizzitello and was acquitted in April 1978 for the January charge, in November 1980, he was convicted of the charges brought to him in February 1978, for racketeering and extortion, and in January 1981, he was sentenced to 4 years in prison, in late 1981, Rizzitello was acquitted of conspiring to murder Jack Napoli, he began his sentence in around June 1983. Rizzitello remained as a capo under LA family acting boss, Peter Milano. In May 1986, Rizzitello was indicted for stock fraud and was acquitted in October 1986. In April 1987, Rizzitello shot William Heldman 3 times in the head, as Heldman owed Rizzitello over $10,000 in a business deal, however Heldman survived the ordeal and later began to cooperate. Rizzitello was also accused of murdering witness, George Yudzevich, in March 1988. In the late 1980s, Rizzitello and Bufalino family acting boss, Edward Sciandra, attempted to extort Frank "Tookie" DiLeo, the manager of musician Michael Jackson, over a $1 million offer he had turned down from Donald Trump, related to a performance at a casino in Atlantic City. In July 1988, Rizzitello was placed in the Nevada black book. In April 1990, Rizzitello was sentenced to 33 years in prison for the attempted murder of William Heldman (Bill Carroll). He died in October 2005.
- Samuel "Sam" Sciortino — former underboss during the 1970s. Sciortino was born in 1919. In October 1968, Sciortino and Peter Milano were proposed for membership into the LA family. In January 1981, Sciortino was sentenced to 4 years in prison and fined $25,000 for extorting pornographic businessmen and gamblers. In December 1981, Sciortino, Philip Rizzuto and New Orleans family boss, Carlos Marcello, were found guilty of conspiring to bribe former United States circuit judge, Harry Pregerson, with an art painting worth $110,000 to help them in a racketeering case in 1979 in which Sciortino was a defendant. He died sometime in the 1980s.
- Frank Stellino (born in 1925) — former soldier. Stellino was born in Detroit, and has relations with former LA family boss, Dominic Brooklier. In April 1949, Stellino married Vittina "Tina" Licata in California, the daughter of Nicolo Licata, whom would also later be the boss of the family. In August 1951, Jimmy Fratianno and Charles Battaglia had murdered Anthony Trombino and Anthony Brancato, both men were later driven by Angelo Polizzi to the house belonging to Stellino, where the men had cleaned up, were given new clothing and their weapons and clothes were disposed of. During the 1960s, Stellino was partnered with Carlo Licata and Anthony Maniscalchi, in illegal gambling, real estate including the rental of apartments, and construction. In 1974, Stellino had moved to Palm Springs, and during that year, he was indicted with Peter Milano, Dominic Brooklier and Samuel Sciortino, for extortion and racketeering. It is believed Stellino was inducted into the LA family as a soldier sometime during the 1970s. He died in 1998.
- John Joseph Vaccaro Jr. — former soldier. Had a criminal history dating back to 1971. In 1985 he was convicted in federal court for being the mastermind of a sophisticated slot cheating ring which stole millions of dollars from Nevada casinos. Was convicted along with his wife Sandra Kay Vaccaro and he was in the Nevada Black Book until he died in 2015. Was incarcerated in Mississippi for another gaming offense involving members of the New Orleans crime family in the 2000s, but was released in 2003. Vaccaro was a resident of Henderson, and owned the company Four Square Construction/Roofing. Vaccaro died in 2015.
- Rocco James "Rocky Bigfoot" Zangari — former soldier. Zangari was born in August 1933. According to former Colombo family and LA family associate, Kenji Gallo, Zangari was an active bookmaker during the mid-1970s based in Palm Springs and was paying tribute money to LA family capo, Michael Rizzitello, and was a close friend and possible business partner to LA family associate, Frank Stellino, before Stellino died in 1998, with Gallo who was first introduced to Zangari during the early 1990s. He once managed a card room for the Cabazon Indian tribe in Riverside, California. According to information by government witness, Anthony Fiato, he had implicated Zangari as a soldier in the LA family by 1984. In May 1987, Zangari and 14 other defendants were indicted on charges of racketeering, murder, extortion, drug trafficking and loansharking, allegedly Zangari wished to stand at trial, however Russell Masetta received instructions from LA family boss, Peter Milano, to take a plea deal, and in May 1988, Zangari received a sentence of 5 years probation with a $2000 fine. In mid-1995, Zangari was involved with a sit-down with LA family capo, Jimmy Caci, as Zangari was held responsible for the extortion of Abe Silfani and Vern Stephens, associates affiliated with Caci. Due to the testimony of Ori Spado, a former associate of the LA family, Zangari was sentenced to 20 months in prison in August 2000 for racketeering, including $75,000 in counterfeit checks, and was released in March 2002. Zangari moved to Buffalo, New York. He died in April 2016.

== Former associates ==
- John Roselli (1940s–1956)
- George "Les" Bruneman (1920s–1937)
- Joseph Sica (1940s–1970s)
- Alfred "Nuncio" Sica (1940s–1970s) brother of Joseph
- Jack Whalen (1940s–1959s)
- Leo "Lips" Moceri (1930s–1960s) Later became a member of the Cleveland crime family.
- Mickey Fine (1960s–1970s)
- Ray Ferritto (1960s–1974)
- Frank Buccieri (1960s–1980s)
- Anthony Brooklier (1970s–2000s) – Lawyer, Dominic Brooklier's son
- "Big" Bruce Comtois (1980s)
- John Patrick DiMattia (1980s–2000s)
- Isador "Teddy" Matranga, son of Joseph Ernest
- Albert Nunez (1980s–1990s)
- Robert Ralph "Dino" D'Agostino (1980s)
- Steve Munichiello (1980s)
- Michael Gelfuso (1980s)
- Robert "Puggy" Zeichick (1980s–1990s)
- Dominic "Donnie Shacks" Montemarano (1990s–2000s) – Colombo family capo based in L.A.
- Ronald A. "Ronnie" Lorenzo (1980s–2000s) – Bonanno soldier based in L.A.
- Johnny Means (1980s–early 2000s)

== Government informants and witnesses ==
- Frank "Bomp" Bompensiero (undercover informant) (1930s–1956, 1947–1953, 1977)
- Aladena "Jimmy the Weasel" Fratianno (government witness) (1953–1956)
- Craig Anthony "the Animal" Fiato (government witness) (1984–1987)
- Kenny Gallo - former associate from the 1980s until the early 2000s. Gallo turned government informant in the 2000s.
- Lawrence "Larry Boy" Fiato (government witness)
- Stephen Mauriello (government witness) (1980s–1997)
- John Louis Branco (born May 28, 1934) — former associate. Branco's family hailed from Campania and Puglia. In 1950, Branco lived in Cleveland. In May 1951, Branco married Leanora Angelone at a ceremony held in DeKalb County, Indiana. In the early 1950s, Branco moved to California and became associated with the Los Angeles family. Branco later claimed that he had been involved in the extortion of casino owners in Las Vegas during the early 1960s and became associated with affilates of the Chicago Mafia. Branco became associated with the crew headed by Mike Rizzitello by the late 1970s. By the early 1980s, Branco was heavily involved in currency counterfeiting, with a wiretap which overheard Branco stating his plan to flood Las Vegas casinos and Los Angeles banks with over $1 million with fake $100 bills. In 1983, Branco was surveilled by the FBI on two occassions meeting with Chicago Outfit enforcer, Anthony Spilotro. In October 1983, Branco was arrested by the Secret Service at the McCarran International Airport in Las Vegas, Branco had $50,000 in counterfeit bills seized from his possession, and had attempted to purchase $5 million in fake currency. In late 1984, Branco was sentenced to 15 years in prison for counterfeiting conspiracy and fraud. In July 1986, Branco agreed to cooperate with the FBI, and was released from prison in July 1989. Branco was listed as the owner of the Gift Box located on 1109 West Capitol Avenue in Sacramento. In 1991, Branco moved to Las Vegas and married Caroline Parsons in February 1992 in Clark County, Nevada. It is believed Branco may of had been excused for his cooperation with the FBI and was once again "on record" with the Jimmy Caci crew, and was heavily involved in debt collection, insurance fraud, gambling and loansharking on behalf of the Caci crew. In April 1996, Louis Caruso, Jimmy Caci, Orland Spado and Kenny Gallo attended either the Tony's Pasta Mia or Club 340 in Palm Spring, with Caruso who had had told the attendees of his intention to propose Branco for membership into the Los Angeles family, Caci reputedly responded with anger, citing Branco's cooperation with the FBI and disallowed the membership of Branco. In July 1996, Branco was arrested for assault and kidnapping after he had attempted to collect money from an escort service operator in Las Vegas, he was bailed for $6000. In December 1996, Branco had contacted LA family and Colombo family associate, Kenji Gallo, regarding buying cocaine for his trafficking operation, however Gallo declined. In 1997, Branco relocated to Arizona, under the protection of the FBI. During the 2000s, Branco refused to enter the WIP (witness protection program) and remained his residency in Nevada, Las Vegas. He died in July 2014.
- Ori Spado (born December 17, 1944) — former associate. Spado's family hailed from Rome. Spado may have had met John "Sonny" Franzese for the first time at the Trattoria Siciliana Restaurant. Spado was associated with former LA family capo, Jimmy Caci, up until the late 1990s. In the late 1990s, Spado was involved in narcotics trafficking, fraud, extortion, stolen goods and home invasions. Colombo family and LA family associate, Kenji Gallo, managed to obtain a tape overhearing a discussion with Spado and FBI agent, Scott Gariola, in July 1996, with whom Spado had cooperated with, and by the late 90s or possibly the early 2000s, this resulted in Spado being banished from the family by LA family boss, Peter Milano. In June 2008, Spado was indicted for a robbery plot in Los Angeles, narcotics trafficking and home invasions, along with affiliates of the New York based Colombo family, in particular with Thomas "Tommy Shots" Gioeli, Sonny Franzese, Dino "Big Dino" Calabro, Christopher "Chris" Curanovic and Angelo Giangrande. In September 2010, Spado was sentenced to 60 months in prison and he was released in November 2012.

== List of murders committed by the Los Angeles crime family ==
Name	Date	Reason
George Leslie "Les" Bruneman and Frank A. Greuzard	October 25, 1937	Bruneman was a rival South Bay racketeer. He refused to join a gambling syndicate headed by Bugsy Siegel, and was ordered killed by Jack Dragna. Bruneman survived a shooting by Frank Bompensiero in Redondo Beach on July 19, 1937. Months later, 40-year-old Bruneman was gunned down by Bompensiero and Calogero "Leo Lips" Moceri at the Roost Cafe in downtown Los Angeles. Greuzard, a bus boy, was also shot after attempting to write down the license plate number of the getaway car.
Harold "Hooky" Rothman	August 18, 1948	Rothman was killed by Frank Bompensiero by using a shotgun during a set-up by Jimmy Fratianno located on 8804 Sunset Boulevard on the Sunset Strip at the corner of Palm Avenue and Holloway Drive. Rothman served as a bodyguard and enforcer to Mickey Cohen with Cohen as the intended target however he had hid in the bathroom inside of his haberdasher store and survived.
Neddie Herbert	July 20, 1949	41-year old Herbert had worked for Bugsy Siegel and later for Mickey Cohen following Siegel's murder in June 1947. Herbert was shot several times by shotgun pellets located on 9039 Sunset Boulevard on the Sunset Strip in Los Angeles outside of Sherry's restaurant and died in hospital six days later at the Queen of Angels Hospital in Los Angeles, Cohen was shot in the shoulder and survived. It is believed the intended target was Harry Cooper, an investigator for Frederick Howser, the 22nd Attorney General of California.
Samuel Louis "Sam" Rummel	December 11, 1950	44-year-old Rummel was an associate and attorney of rival mob boss Mickey Cohen. He was shotgunned outside his home in Laurel Canyon by Angelo Polizzi on the morning he was scheduled to testify before a grand jury regarding a bookmaking and loansharking operation in Los Angeles County.
Anthony Trombino and Anthony Brancato	August 6, 1951	31-year old Trombino and 37-year old Brancato were shot and killed by Jimmy "the Weasel" Fratianno and Charley "Batts" Battaglia. Brancato was shot 6 times in the head with a bullet which ricocheted and killed Trombino located on 1648 North Ogden Drive near Hollywood Boulevard in Los Angeles. It is believed Los Angeles family don, Jack Dragna, ordered the death's of Trombino and Brancato as the two men were alleged to have committed unsanctioned robberies including the Flamingo Hotel and extorted affiliates of the Los Angeles family, on one occasion Trombino and Brancato pocketed a $3,000 gambling debt from Sam Lazes, an associate of the Los Angeles family, and refused to pay tribute from the debt, Fratianno had warned both men and refused to listen to him and were subsequently killed.
Frank Borgia	December 26, 1951	56-year old Borgia was ordered to be killed by Jack Dragna, the boss of the Los Angeles family, as Borgia refused to comply with an extortion attempt targeting himself by Dragna and Gaspare "Jasper" Matranga, and that Borgia refused to hand over $25,000 from a winery sale, Dragna also allegedly suspected Borgia of being an informant. It is believed Tony Mirabile lured Borgia to a house belonging to Joe Adamo located on 4010 S. Hempstead Circle in San Diego, California, where Jimmy Fratianno and Frank Bompensiero strangled Borgia to death with a rope.
Louis "Russian Louie" Strauss	April 16, 1953	It is believed 48-year old Strauss was murdered for attempting to extort Benny Binion. Strauss was picked up in a Cadillac vehicle driven by Felix "Milwaukee Phil" Alderisio in a parking lot in Las Vegas near his apartment located on 209 North 15th Street, Alderisio was better known as the underboss in the Chicago Outfit to Sam Giancana during the 1960s, and also present was Jimmy Fratianno. According to Jimmy Fratianno, whom later turned as a government informant in December 1977, Strauss was murdered by himself and Frank Bompensiero after Strauss told his wife that he was travelling to the El Mirador Hotel in Palm Springs, California, Fratianno had told Strauss that he was going to help his financial trouble by giving him $10,000, Fratianno and Bompensiero later strangled Staruss with a rope inside of a house located in Southern California.
Julius Anthony Petro	January 12, 1969	46-year-old Petro feuded with John Monica over a bookmaking operation. He was shot in the head by Ray Ferritto after being driven to Los Angeles Airport and found dead in his car.
Frank "Bomp" Bompensiero	February 10, 1977	71-year old Bompensiero was shot four times in the neck and head and killed located near an alley off Lamont Street in Pacific Beach in San Diego, California, with Thomas Ricciardi being the shooter and Jack LoCicero as the getaway driver. Bompensiero served as a capo for the Los Angeles family and headed the San Diego crew. It is believed Bompensiero was killed for being a federal informant since at least 1967.

== In popular culture ==
- Former Los Angeles crime family boss Jack Dragna appears as a character in several books, films and TV series:
  - He appears as a character in two of the books in James Ellroy's L.A. Quartet novel series, The Big Nowhere (1988) and White Jazz (1992).
  - In the 1991 biographical drama film Bugsy, he is portrayed by Richard C. Sarafian.
  - Though he does not make an actual appearance, he is mentioned several times in the 2011 video game L.A. Noire.
  - In the 2013 action thriller film Gangster Squad, he is portrayed by Jon Polito.
  - In the British spy-fi TV series The Avengers, he is played by American-British actor Reed De Rouen.
  - In the 2013 American neo-noir TV series Mob City, he is portrayed by Paul Ben-Victor.
- The 2011 biopic crime film Kill the Irishman features as one of its main characters the notorious hitman Ray Ferritto (played by Robert Davi), who worked for both the Los Angeles crime family and the Cleveland crime family and was a key associate of Jimmy "Jimmy the Weasel" Fratianno (the acting boss of the Los Angeles crime family between 1975 and 1977).
- Former acting boss James "Jimmy the Weasel" Fratianno is portrayed by Joseph Riccobene in Martin Scorsese's crime film The Irishman (2019).

== See also ==
- Crime in Los Angeles
- Italians in Los Angeles
- List of Italian Mafia crime families
- Organized crime in California

== Sources ==
=== Books ===
- Bureau of Narcotics (2009), Mafia: The Government's Secret File on Organized Crime, Skyhorse Publishing Inc., ISBN 9781602396685
- Demaris, Ovid (1981), The Last Mafioso: The Treacherous World of Jimmy Fratianno, Bantam Books, ISBN 0-8129-0955-0
- DeVico, Peter (2007), The Mafia Made Easy: The Anatomy and Culture of La Cosa Nostra, Tate Publishing, pp. 152–154, ISBN 978-1-60247-254-9
- Gaines, Lee. "LA Crime File" Gate City Publishing (2004)
- Gallo, Kenny, Randazzo, Matthew. Breakshot: A Life in the 21st Century American Mafia. Phoenix Books, 2009. ISBN 1-59777-615-7
- Moore, Judith. A Bad, Bad Boy: The Most Feared Mobster in Southern California for 30 Years. Reader Books, 2009. ISBN 0-615-29879-6
- Charles Rappleye; Ed Becker (1995). All American Mafioso: The Johnny Rosselli Story. Barricade Books. ISBN 978-1-56980-027-0.
- Smith, John L. The Animal in Hollywood. Barricade Books. 1998. ISBN 1-56980-126-6
- Tereba, Tere (2012). Mickey Cohen: The Life and Crimes of L.A.'s Notorious Mobster. Toronto, Ontario: ECW Press. ISBN 978-1-77090-203-9. LCCN 2012944624. OCLC 797830888.
- Warner, Richard N. (2008), The First Mafia Boss of Los Angeles? The Mystery of Vito Di Giorgio, 1880–1922, On the Spot Journal

=== Reports ===
- Lockyer, Bill (2003). Organized Crime in California: Annual Report to the California Legislature 2003 (PDF) (Report). Office of the Attorney General – via California Department of Justice.
- Lungren, Dan (1997). Organized Crime in California: Annual Report to the California Legislature 1996 (PDF) (Report). Office of the Attorney General – via California Department of Justice.
- Van de Kamp, John (June 1987). Organized Crime in California: Annual Report to the California Legislature 1986 (PDF) (Report). Office of the Attorney General – via California Department of Justice.
- Younger, Evelle J. (May 2, 1978). First Report of the Organized Crime Control Commission (PDF) (Report). Office of the Attorney General – via California Department of Justice.
