= Anthony Fiato =

American mobster

Craig Anthony Fiato (born August 31, 1949), also known as "Anthony the Animal" and "Tony Rome", is an American former mobster and hitman for the Los Angeles crime family who later became an undercover informant and government witness. In the words of retired FBI undercover agent Bob Hamer, "Anthony Fiato was a major player in that whole organized crime scene" in 1980s Los Angeles.

Fiato grew up in Boston to law-abiding parents. At age 17, his family moved to Hollywood. Under his mentor Michael "Mike Rizzi" Rizzitello, Fiato rose in rank to enforcer and street boss of Rizzi's breakaway Los Angeles crew. Fiato also worked with mobsters Anthony "The Ant" Spilotro, "Handsome Johnny" Roselli, Joey Gallo, Peter Milano, J.R. Russo, and "Jimmy the Weasel" Fratianno, among many others. Fiato was a feared member of the Los Angeles crime family. Consigliere Jack LoCicero sponsored Fiato's membership into the Los Angeles crime family. Fiato was a major gangster with close ties to the Patriarca crime family and Joseph "J.R." Russo, the Gambino crime family through Aniello Dellacroce, and the Los Angeles crime family through his mentor Rizzitello.

Turning informant after his brother Larry became an FBI informant and gave up their rackets, Fiato put away many major mob gangsters in both Los Angeles and Boston. After joining the witness protection program, Fiato became a tabloid celebrity thanks to his testimony at the O. J. Simpson murder case, his appearance on the Howard Stern Show, and his relationship with Denise Brown, the sister of Simpson's murdered ex-wife. Fiato also cooperated with journalist John L. Smith, who wrote his biography The Animal Hollywood: Anthony Fiato's Life in the Mafia.
