= Momo Adamo =

Italian American mobster

Girolamo "Momo" Adamo (1895–1956) was an Italian American mobster in the American Mafia. He lived in Chicago and Kansas City before moving to Los Angeles in the 1930s and soon became underboss to Jack Dragna in the Los Angeles crime family. His brother Joseph Adamo was also a member of the crime family. Both he and his brother were well connected criminals in San Diego, working with such mobsters as Frank Bompensiero and Jimmy (The Weasel) Fratianno.

In 1950, Adamo was arrested, along with several members of Jack Dragna's family including Tom Dragna (brother), Louis Dragna (nephew), and two men named Frank Paul Dragna (his son and nephew, respectively), when Dragna fled the state after being named in the California Crime Commission report as a member of a crime syndicate in Los Angeles. The five of them were taken into custody by the Los Angeles Police Department, which believed they were responsible for bombing Mickey Cohen's home or knew who was. The men were all released without being charged when the police were unable to find evidence of their involvement (Tom built the bomb, but otherwise none of them were involved).

When Jack Dragna died in 1956, the Los Angeles crime family cast a secret vote to see who would become the next boss. Adamo was hoping as a long-time Los Angeles Mob leader he would be elected. However, USC trained lawyer-turned-mobster Frank DeSimone was elected boss in what is believed to be a rigged election. DeSimone demoted Adamo, and Adamo moved to San Diego shortly after.

In the same year, Adamo attempted a murder–suicide by shooting his wife Marie Adamo in the head before shooting and killing himself; Marie survived and recovered. The reason for the attempted murder was never confirmed. It appears that Marie was having an affair during their marriage, leading some to speculate that Adamo committed these actions after finding out about it. Marie Adamo, who never talked about the shooting incident publicly, later married Frank Bompensiero, who was widowed after his wife Thelma died.

== Notes ==
American Mafia
Preceded by Jack Dragna	Los Angeles crime family Underboss; 1931-1956	Succeeded by Simone Scozzari
