= Dominic Brooklier =

American mobster (1914–1984)

- Born: Domenico Brucceleri; November 19, 1914; Los Angeles, California, U.S.
- Died: July 18, 1984 (aged 69); Tucson, Arizona, U.S.
- Other names: Jimmy Regace
- Occupation: Crime boss
- Children: 3
- Allegiance: Los Angeles crime family

Dominic Phillip Brooklier (born Domenico Brucceleri; November 19, 1914 — July 18, 1984) was an American mobster and boss of the Los Angeles crime family of the Mafia during the mid-1970s who mainly worked in pornography, extortion, and gambling.

== Early years ==
Brooklier joined Mickey Cohen's syndicate gambling operations in Southern California in the 1940s under the name Jimmy Regace. During the Sunset Wars of the 1940s, Brooklier defected to rival Los Angeles mobster Jack Dragna's Los Angeles crime family. In 1947, Brooklier became a made man in the family. While working for Dragna, Brooklier unsuccessfully attempted to assassinate Cohen as he left a restaurant. From 1947 to 1953, Brooklier worked closely with Los Angeles family member Jimmy Fratianno in loansharking. At some time in the late 1960s, Brooklier was promoted to caporegime in charge of a crew in Orange County, where he also lived. Sometime later, he legally changed his name to Dominic Brooklier.

In early 1974, Brooklier replaced the deceased Joseph Dippolito as family underboss. On October 19, 1974, family boss Nick Licata died and Brooklier was elected the new boss. Also in 1974, Brooklier and new underboss Samuel Sciortino were charged with racketeering under the federal Racketeer Influenced and Corrupt Organizations Act (RICO). Brooklier was specifically charged with extorting payments from a bookmaker in 1973. On April 19, 1975, the two men pleaded guilty to one count.

== Bompensiero murder ==
In 1975, Brooklier ordered the killing of Los Angeles mobster Frank "The Bomp" Bompensiero. Brooklier had lost trust in Bompensiero's ability to keep secrets, and was angry at his criticisms of Brooklier's leadership. However, Bompensiero, a hit man himself, and always a cautious man, proved to be an elusive target. In 1976, to allay Bompensiero's suspicions, Brooklier appointed him consigliere of the Los Angeles family. Unknown to Brooklier, Bompensiero was now working as a Federal Bureau of Investigation (FBI) informant. In March 1976, Bompensiero persuaded Brooklier to extort payments from Forex, a new company that produced pornography. However, Forex was actually created by the FBI as a sting operation. When the family discovered the sting, Fratianno immediately suspected Bompernsiero of being an informant. On February 10, 1977, Los Angeles mobster Thomas Ricciardi finally fulfilled the murder contract by shooting Bompensiero in a phone booth near his apartment.

== Conflict with Fratianno and death ==
While Brooklier was serving prison time in the mid-1970s, he appointed Jimmy Fratianno as his acting boss. Seeing a challenge to his authority, Brooklier placed a murder contract on Fratianno for what he felt was Fratianno's attempt at trying to usurp him. However, Fratianno had been informed by the FBI of the contract, and Fratianno agreed to turn state's evidence and testify against his Mafia associates in 1979. Fratianno now implicated Brooklier in the 1977 Bompensiero murder.

In 1978, Brooklier was indicted on charges of racketeering, extortion, and murder. In November 1980, he was convicted of racketeering and extortion, but was acquitted of Bompensiero's murder; he was sentenced two months later to five years in prison. Brooklier's son, Anthony, was a criminal defense attorney; at the 1981 sentencing before the U.S. district judge, Anthony made a sobbing plea on his father's behalf: "There are things in his past he shouldn't be proud of, and I'm not proud of... But he's always provided for his family. Whatever sentence he does, he'll be missed every day." On July 18, 1984, Dominic Brooklier died of a heart attack at the Tucson Federal Correctional Complex (FCC) near Tucson, Arizona.

American Mafia
Preceded by Nick Licata (1967-1974)	Los Angeles crime family Boss; 1974-1984	Succeeded by Peter Milano (1984-present)
Preceded by Joseph Dippolito (1967-1974)	Los Angeles crime family Underboss; 1974	Succeeded by Samuel Sciortino (1974-1984)
