= Peter Milano =

American mobster (1925–2012)

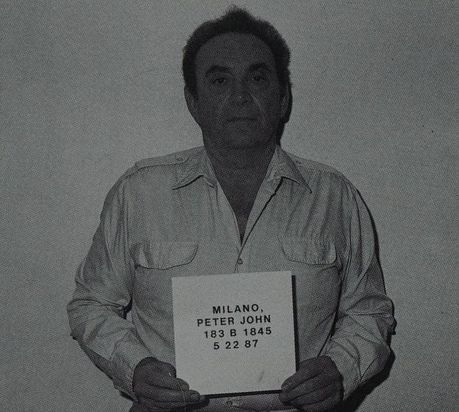
- Milano's May 22, 1987 FBI mugshot
- Born: Peter John Milano; December 22, 1925; Cleveland, Ohio, U.S.
- Died: April 21, 2012 (aged 86); Los Angeles, California, U.S.
- Other name: "Pete"
- Occupation: Crime boss
- Predecessor: Dominic Brooklier
- Successor: Tommaso Gambino
- Parent: Anthony Milano (father)
- Relatives: Frank Milano (uncle); Carmen Milano (brother)
- Allegiance: Los Angeles crime family

Peter John Milano (December 22, 1925 – April 21, 2012) was a Los Angeles-based, American mobster, and former boss of the Los Angeles crime family. Milano was active in organized crime from the 1950s until his death. His legitimate businesses were in real estate properties and a vending company called "Rome Vending Company".

== Early life ==
Milano was born in 1925 in Cleveland, Ohio to Anthony and Josephine Milano. His father was underboss of the Cleveland crime family from the 1930s until his retirement in 1976. Many members of the Milano family were involved in organized crime, including his uncle Frank Milano, who was boss of the Cleveland family and sat on the original Commission from 1931 until he chose to flee the country to avoid tax evasion charges in 1935. His brothers were also involved in the Mafia except for Carmen Milano who chose to be a lawyer until eventually also becoming a mobster in the 1980s. He is also related through marriage to John Nardi who was a Mafia associate who was killed for switching sides to the Irish Mob, during the Cleveland family's war with Danny Greene. Milano moved with his family to Beverly Hills, California in the late 1930s or early 1940s as a teenager. After graduating from high school, Milano became a part of Mickey Cohen's syndicate and was involved in illegal gambling.

== Los Angeles crime family ==
After switching allegiance to the Los Angeles crime family, Milano became a made man in 1970. Soon after, he was promoted to caporegime (captain) in the family. His father Anthony, while also being one of the main criminal powers in Cleveland, also had interests on the West Coast and was closely associated with the L.A family. In March 1973, Milano and six others were charged with running a rigged gambling operation in Los Angeles that brought in up to $250,000 a month. Their trial was delayed when the key informant and witness, former Mafia associate John Dubcek, was shot and killed in Las Vegas. Although this scared other informants from testifying, Milano was still sentenced to four years in prison. Months later Milano and 11 other men were indicted for conspiracy, racketeering and extortion against bookmakers, loan sharks, and pornographers. Milano served four years for both indictments.

=== Boss ===
In 1981 the top members of the Los Angeles crime family, including boss Dominic Brooklier, were sentenced to jail time on RICO charges. This left a power vacuum in the family and enabled Milano to step up and become acting boss. With Brooklier's death in 1984, Milano was made boss of the family and named his brother Carmen his underboss. Milano took charge of a depleted family and was successful in having illegal bookmakers pay tribute to his family, which was already heavily involved in extortion.

On October 28, 1984, Milano was one of twenty people arrested as part of the LAPD's "Operation Lightweight" and accused of trying to take over a $1 million-a-week book making operation. Milano was released due to lack of evidence.

Milano and his brother, Carmen, were among fifteen people arrested and charged on May 22, 1987, in an 18-count federal racketeering indictment following a four-year investigation by the Department of Justice Organized Crime Task Force and the FBI. The indictment linked Milano with a conspiracy to murder Louis Tom Dragna over a statement that Dragna had given to the FBI, as well as the planned murder of John Patrick DeMattia. In March 1988, Milano pleaded guilty again to racketeering charges and received a six-year prison sentence. He never acknowledged being a part of the Mafia. On April 4, 1991, Milano was paroled from prison. He was able to avoid any jail time from the Las Vegas indictments brought on by the murder of Herbert Blitzstein in 1997.

== Death ==
Milano died on April 21, 2012, at the age of 86.

American Mafia
Preceded by Dominic Brooklier	Los Angeles crime family Boss; 1984-2012	Succeeded by Tommaso "Tommy" Gambino
