= Sam Lazes =

California bookie (1915–2006)

- Born: June 22, 1915; New York, U.S.
- Died: February 26, 2006 (aged 90); California, U.S.

Sam Lazes (June 22, 1915 – February 26, 2006) was an alleged bookmaker who worked in southern California, United States. He was a suspect in the murder of "the two Tonys" in 1951. In 1974 he was arrested by an organized-crime task force investigating bookmaking at Del Mar Racetrack.

== Biography ==
Lazes was born in New York in 1915. In 1951, when the Los Angeles Police Department (LAPD) raided the Hollywood Hills brothel occupied and operated by Barrie Benson, they arrested Benson and Mickey Cohen's sometime bodyguard, Sam Farkas. Police then placed Benson's three-year-old daughter in custody of her father, Sam Lazes. Later that year, two men known to history as the two Tonys were shot to death in a car in Hollywood; LAPD arrested Jimmy Fratianno, his brother Warren Fratianno, a small-time actor named Sam London, and Lazes as suspects in the crime. According to the Mob Museum, the hit was ordered by Jack Dragna and carried out by Jimmy the Weasel and Charley Battaglia after the two Tonys had relieved Lazes of $3,000 that was claimed by the organized crime syndicate in the area. In August 1953, a series of articles in the Los Angeles Illustrated Daily News suggested that a Culver City club called Toddle House was a hangout for bookmakers, racketeers, and pimps, namely Lazes, Farkas, Fratianno, and Jimmy Utley. In 1957 Lazes was arrested for possession of marijuana, at which time the Los Angeles Mirror stated, "Lazes has never been convicted of a felony but his arrest record in Los Angeles includes suspicion of murder, robbery, extortion, and bookmaking. Lazes was one of several suspects jailed after Tony Brancato and Tony Trombino were found shot to death in a car in Hollywood." Lazes was described as a "businessman and gambler" during a 1967 hearing about illegal gambling at the Friars Club. Lazes was arrested in 1974 by an organized-crime task force focused on illegal bookmaking at Del Mar Racetrack. Lazes died in California in 2006.
