= Neddie Herbert =

American criminal (1907–1949)

Edward Herbert
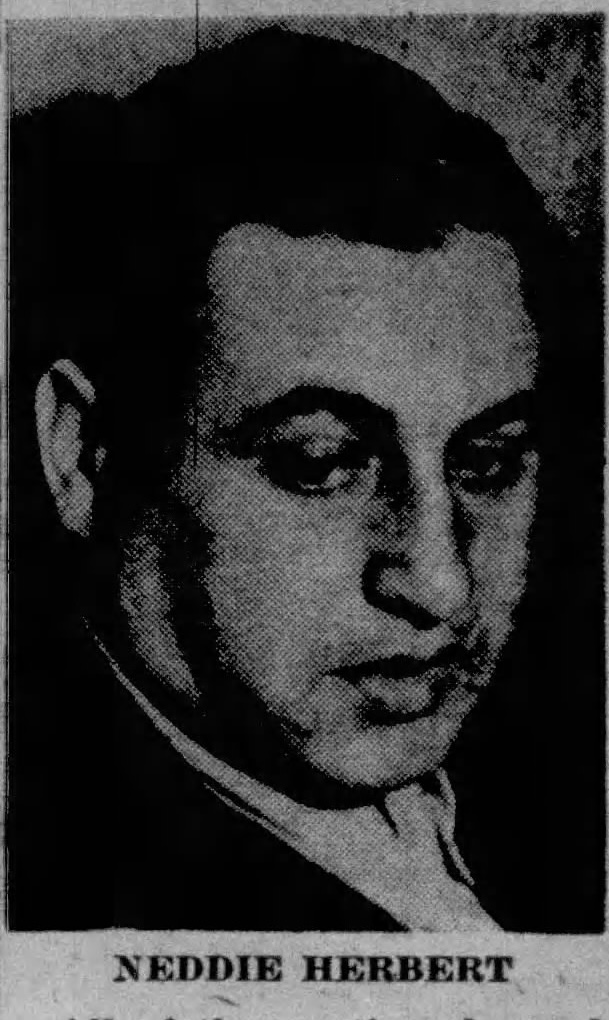
- Born: Edward Herbert; December 1, 1907; New York City, New York, U.S.
- Died: July 28, 1949 (aged 41); Los Angeles, California, U.S.
- Cause of death: Homicide
- Other names: Neddie, Neddy
- Occupations: Gangster, enforcer, bodyguard
- Parent: Herbert (?)
- Allegiance: Benjamin Siegel, Cohen Gang

Edward Herbert (1907–1949) was an American criminal active in the 1940s.

== Early life ==
Edward Herbert was born on December 1, 1907, in New York City, New York. He was the youngest of five and grew up in New York City. He was the brother of Arthur "Tootsie" Herbert and Charlie Herbert, both of whom were involved in the kosher chicken union rackets. He was a confidant and associate of Mickey Cohen.

== Los Angeles ==
When his boss, Benjamin Siegel, moved out to Los Angeles, California, Herbert did the same. When he moved to L.A., he worked as an enforcer for the Siegel-Cohen crime family. On June 20, 1947, Siegel was murdered by an apparent East Coast Mafia hitman with a .30 caliber military M1 Carbine.

When Siegel was murdered, his right-hand man, Mickey Cohen became the boss of his criminal empire, spanning from Los Angeles to Burbank to Las Vegas. Along with Harry "Hooky" Rothman, Nerbert was a top lieutenant of Cohen's. However, one of Siegel's lieutenants and Cohen's rival, Jack Dragna, did not like his rise as boss and decided to mount a full-scale war against Cohen.

=== Battle of Sunset Strip ===
Dragna and Cohen's war was nicknamed the "Battle of Sunset Strip". Dragna soon began to eliminate Cohen's lieutenants, one by one; he ordered the deaths of Harold Rothman, Frank Niccoli, Anthony Brancato, and several others.

== Death and aftermath ==
At 3:55 a.m. on July 20, 1949, Dragna made another move on Cohen, but this time with civilians in the mix. A failed shooting attempt was made with several people injured: reporter Florabel Muir, Dee David (an actress), Cohen, Harry Cooper (a bodyguard assigned to Cohen by Frederick N. Howser), and Herbert was injured.

But, later, Herbert died of his wounds that same day and was buried in New York.

== Media ==
- Evan Jones portrayed Herbert in the 2013 film Gangster Squad.
