= The two Tonys =

U.S. organized-crime figures

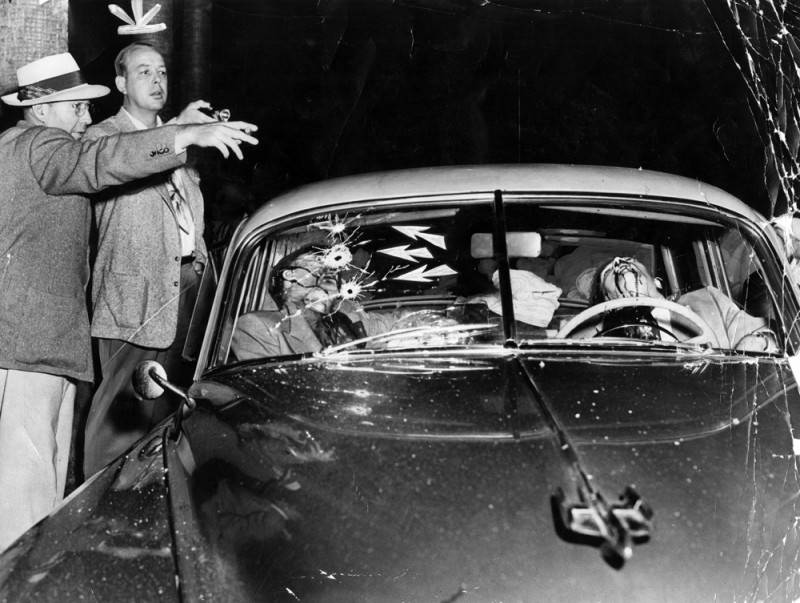
Herald Examiner photo of the aftermath of the murder of the two Tonys (Los Angeles Public Library photo collection)

The two Tonys is a phrase that describes two American underworld figures and murder victims, Tony Brancato, and Tony Trombino, who were killed in the Hollywood district of Los Angeles, California, United States, on August 6, 1951.

== History ==
Per testimony before the California state legislature in 1959, the two Tonys started out in Kansas City, Missouri, before moving their partnership to the West Coast of the United States. One history of crime in Los Angeles described the pair as "muscle-men and shakedown artists who made their living preying on bookies and gamblers".

According to the Mob Museum, the hit on the two Tonys was ordered by Jack Dragna and carried out by Jimmy "the Weasel" Fratianno and Charley Battaglia after the two Tonys had relieved Sam Lazes of $3,000 that was claimed by the organized crime syndicate in the area.
