= Nick Licata (mobster) =

Italian-American crime boss (1897–1974)

- Licata's mug shot taken in the 1960s
- Born: Nicolò Licata; February 20, 1897; Camporeale, Sicily, Italy
- Died: October 19, 1974 (aged 77); Los Angeles, California, U.S.
- Resting place: Holy Cross Cemetery, Culver City
- Citizenship: American
- Known for: Crime boss
- Spouse: Josephine Licata
- Children: 3
- Allegiance: Detroit Partnership; Los Angeles crime family

Nick "Old Man" Licata (born Nicolò Licata; Italian pronunciation: [nikoˈlɔ lliˈkaːta]; February 20, 1897 – October 19, 1974) was an Italian American mobster who was the boss of the Los Angeles crime family from 1967 until his death in 1974.

== Early life ==
Licata was born on February 20, 1897, in the small Italian town of Camporeale, in Sicily (although his surname may suggest family origins in Licata). He was the son of Calogero and Vita, and had six brothers and two sisters. According to his records at Ellis Island, he boarded the Sant' Anna in Palermo at age 16 with $25. On December 5, 1913, Licata arrived in the United States and joined his brother Leonardo in Brooklyn. He later legally anglicised his first name to "Nick". During the 1920s Licata became involved in bootlegging in Detroit during the Prohibition era. He eventually became a "made man" in the Detroit crime family. He left for Los Angeles after offending its boss, Joseph Zerilli. He endeared himself to L.A. boss Jack Dragna who was able to convince Zerilli to call off a murder contract on Licata. He was accepted as a member of the L.A. family and became close to Dragna's brother, consigliere Tom Dragna. On March 25, 1932, Licata became a naturalized citizen. He resided in Inglewood and owned several apartment buildings, including the one he lived in. Licata owned barrooms and operated as a bookie and loan shark out of a hangout on La Brea Avenue in Hollywood and a cafe/club called the "Five O'Clock Cafe" at 216 E. Angeleno St., in Burbank. He was arrested once in 1945 for refilling liquor containers.

== Soldier to boss ==
In 1951, Nick Licata provided a tight alibi for Aladena "Jimmy the Weasel" Fratianno the night Fratianno gunned down two L.A. rogue stick up robbers from Kansas City, Anthony Brancato and Anthony Trombino, known as "The Two Tonys". Licata held a fish fry party at his Five O'Clock Club Burbank Restaurant restaurant, and other guests and a waitress testified before a grand jury that Fratianno and his associates were at the restaurant the entire night. Fratianno, Licata, Charles "Charley Bats" Battaglia, Angelo Polizzi, and Leo "Lips" Moceri were all arrested, but none were charged for the crime. It wasn't until Fratianno became an FBI government witness over 25 years later that the belief of the LAPD was confirmed.

In 1952, Jack Dragna promoted Jimmy Fratianno to caporegime (captain). To pacify Licata, who was the more logical candidate, Licata was allowed to work directly under Dragna. Licata made good connections with Mafia families in Detroit, Dallas, Kansas City, and New Orleans. When Dragna died in 1956, Frank DeSimone became the new boss of the family. He named Licata his consigliere, who was a popular choice among the younger family members. When DeSimone's underboss Simone Scozzari was deported to Italy in 1962 for being an illegal immigrant, Nick Licata became DeSimone's underboss.

When Frank DeSimone died of a heart attack, Licata became new L.A. Mob boss with no opposition in 1967, and he made Joseph Dippolito of Upland, his underboss. By this time the Los Angeles mob family was a lot different from the one Licata first started with. The L.A.P.D. and F.B.I. was engaged in a tough assault against organized crime in Los Angeles, and Mafia families from other cities were stretching their power to the West Coast. Although seen as an improvement over the incompetent DeSimone, Licata wasn't able to do much to help his family.

On July 9, 1969, Licata was taken into custody after refusing to answer questions at a federal grand jury session about L.A.'s crime syndicate structure. Although Licata was under immunity from prosecution, he refused to give Judge Jesse W. Curtis Jr. any information, thus maintaining the Mafia's oath of omertà. He was held in contempt of court and eventually served six months in prison. The court was looking into the murder of Jules Petro (which was committed by Ray Ferritto) and the Apalachin Meeting attended by Licata's predecessor Frank DeSimone. Licata also refused to acknowledge that he succeeded DeSimone as head of the crime family.

== Personal life and death ==
Licata eventually regained his good standing in Detroit. In 1953, his son Carlo married Josephine Tocco, the daughter of Detroit underboss William "Black Bill" Tocco. Licata attended the wedding in Detroit. Officer Jack O'Mara found the wedding invitations with the names of members of Detroit's and L.A.'s crime families on them while carrying out an arrest warrant on Licata. He illegally took them, showing the police's determination to bring down organized crime in California. Licata's son-in-law Frank Stellino was also active as a "made man" in Los Angeles during the 1960s and 1970s.

Licata spent his last days at Saint John's Health Center in Santa Monica. After battling illness for some time, he died on October 19, 1974, nine months after his underboss died of a heart attack. He was buried in Culver City at the Holy Cross Cemetery. His funeral was attended by 150 people. One newspaper described him as a true Godfather in every respect.

== Sources ==
- Ellisisland.org
- "Alleged L.A. Mafia Chief Goes to Jail". The Spokesman-Review. July 10, 1969. p. 6.
- "Nick Licata Dies; Headed LA Area Mafia for 6 Years". Los Angeles Times. October 21, 1974. pp. A3.
- Nash, Jay Robert World Encyclopedia of Organized Crime (reprint, illustrated ed.) Da Capo Press. (1993) ISBN 0-306-80535-9 Retrieved on May 22, 2009.

American Mafia
Preceded by Frank DeSimone	Los Angeles crime family Boss; 1967-1974	Succeeded by Dominic Brooklier
Preceded by Simone Scozzari	Los Angeles crime family Underboss; 1962-1967	Succeeded by Joseph Dippolito
Preceded by Tom Dragna	Los Angeles crime family Consigliere; 1931-1956	Succeeded by Tommy Palermo
