= Toddle House (Culver City) =

Defunct nightclub in California (1946–1953)

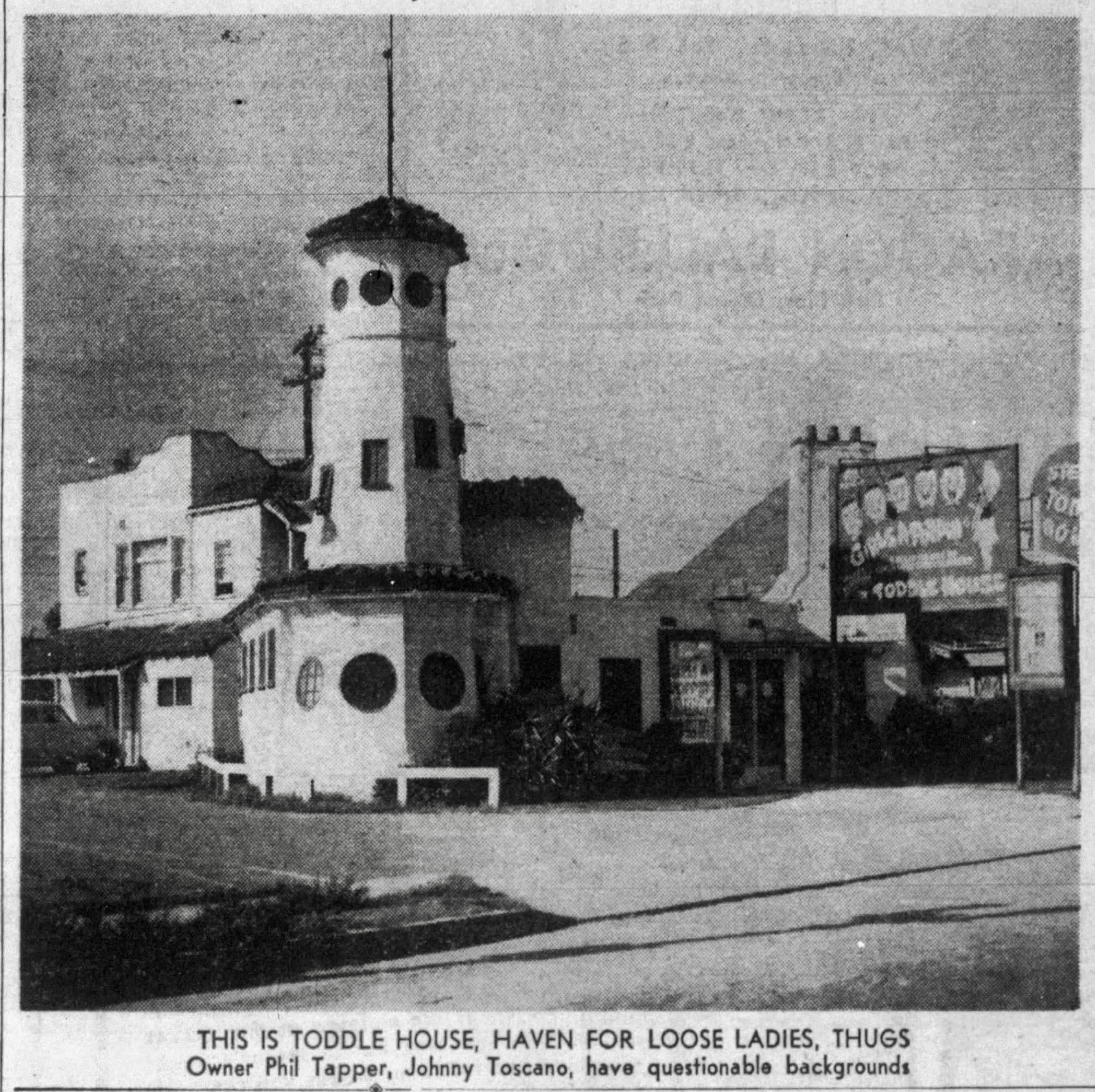
- Interactive map of the Toddle House area

General information
- Location: 5963 W. Washington Blvd., Culver City, California, United States
- Coordinates: 34.0323°N 118.3757°W

The Toddle House was a night club that operated from approximately 1946 until 1953 in Culver City, California, United States. It featured live music, steak dinners, and what would now be called strippers. The club was allegedly used for prostitution and as a hangout for racketeers. Shortly after the club's liquor license was suspended by the state and operating permit was revoked by the city, the building was gutted by two fires that broke out in different locations within the structure on the same morning.

== History ==
The club opened in approximately 1946. Advertisements placed in the Venice Vanguard in 1946 announced that steak dinners were served from 5 p.m. to 9 p.m., that there was no cover charge, and that Haven Johnson "with his funny songs" would be playing piano as part of the "continuous entertainment". In 1951 consumers reported issues with larceny and assault at the Toddle House. Fortnight magazine interviewed Johnny Toscano for a 1951 article entitled "The Los Angeles Bump & Grind Industry - How Wicked Is Burlesque? - Is it Really Harming Anyone?" An advertorial column in the Vanguard in 1952 described Girls A-Poppin as a floor show with a comedian and a "bevy of beauties who really keep things poppin'". In addition to a "variety of potent cocktails" served at the "mirrored bar," the Toddle House offered its patrons "lots of convenient free parking".

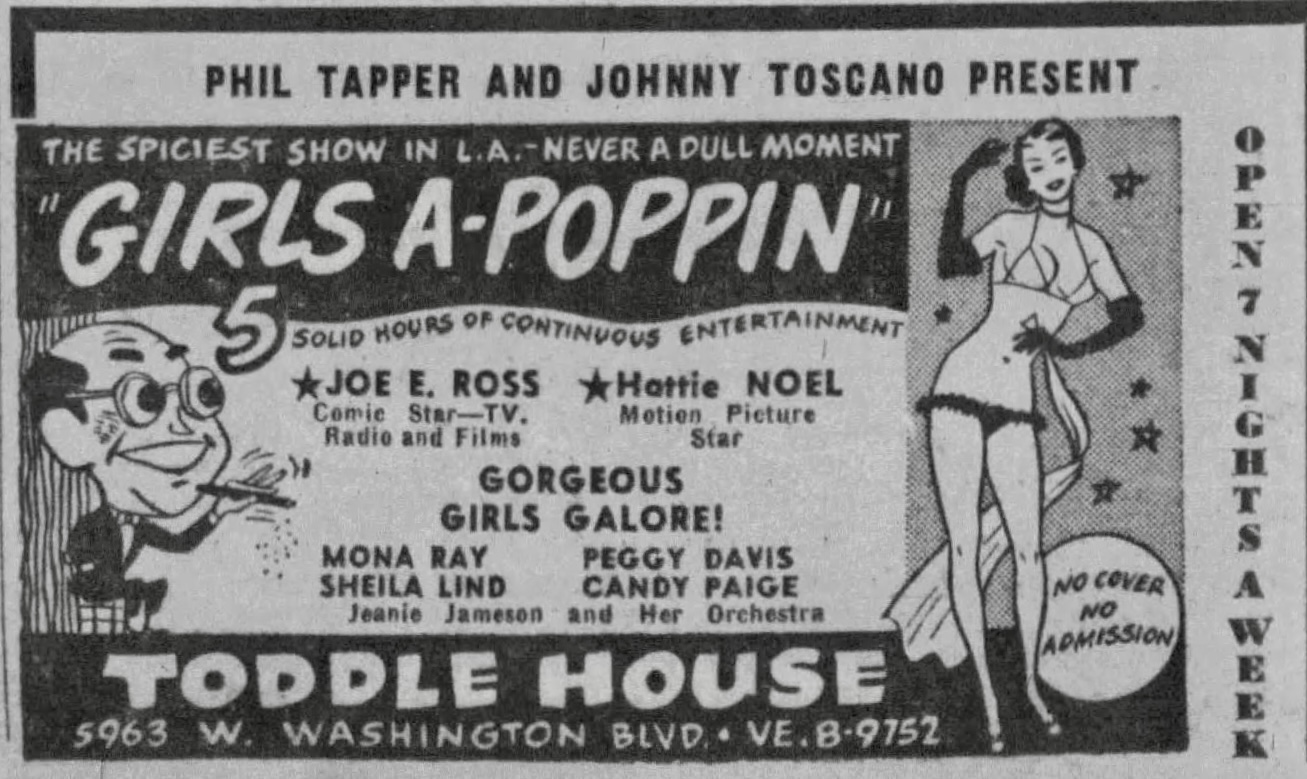
Display ad placed in Daily News, March 3, 1952

In August 1953, a series of articles in the Los Angeles Illustrated Daily News suggested that the club was a hangout for bookmakers, racketeers, and pimps, namely Sam Lazes, Jimmy Fratianno, Jimmy Utley, and Sam Farkas, and was co-owned by Phil Tapper, described as a "gambler and bookmaker," and Johnny Toscano, who had a burglary conviction in New York. Moreover, the Daily News suggested that illegal activities at the club were being overlooked by the Culver City Police Department in exchange for payoffs. It was suggested that a city ballot measure designed to increase pay rates for municipal police officers (and thus diminish their need for outside income) was being opposed by some Culver City employees in order to maintain the status quo. The measure passed, after which a Culver City police source told the Daily News that the "biggest crime dodge In Culver City was bookmaking, a line of endeavor which evidently met the approval of some higher-ups. There are no brothels in the town...but the age-old profession of prostitution flourishes on a call-girl set-up in one of the notorious dives. 'If you're one of the boys,' he said, 'you just call and reserve a table for $25 or maybe even $150 and get fixed up'." Shortly thereafter the club's liquor license was suspended, shuttering the club for 15 days, for being what state and city officials described as a site of "lewd and lascivious entertainment and...hangout for undesirable individuals including prostitutes and solicitors for unlawful activities".

On December 15, 1953, the Culver City City Council revoked the club's permits to operate in the city, and Tapper and Toscano agreed in writing to vacate the premises within 60 days. On December 30, 1953, a fire broke out in the building at 4:15 a.m. and was extinguished by the Culver City Fire Department. A second fire broke out at 6 a.m. in a totally different part of the building and ultimately gutted the structure, despite a three-hour effort to extinguish it. Police were not able to apprehend or question a man who appeared to be lurking at the scene, interested in the work of the firefighters. The cause of the first fire was determined to be lit cigarettes deposited in full wastebasket. According to the official report, the second fire was the result of an electrical short circuit and "started in the southeast part of the cocktail barroom near the ceiling, spreading to the ceiling and to the dining room. From the intense heat, the fire gradually worked itself down, but did not reach the floor level". No connection was drawn between the two fires.
