= Campisi's Egyptian Restaurant =

Italian-American restaurant in Dallas, Texas, US

Coordinates: 32.836338°N 96.771688°W

Campisi's Restaurant
- Interactive map of Campisi's Restaurant

Restaurant information
- Established: 1946
- Location: Dallas, Texas, U.S.
- Website: Campisi's Restaurant

Campisi's Restaurant is an Italian-American restaurant chain based in Dallas, Texas, offering a self-described Roman cuisine focusing on pizza and pasta. As of 2023, the chain has nine locations throughout the Dallas–Fort Worth metroplex.

Founded in 1946 by Sicilian immigrants Carlos and Antonina Campisi, the business was initially called Campisi's Egyptian Restaurant after lacking money needed to change the signage at their first location, which had originally been occupied by The Egyptian Lounge. The oldest location still bears the original name.

== History ==
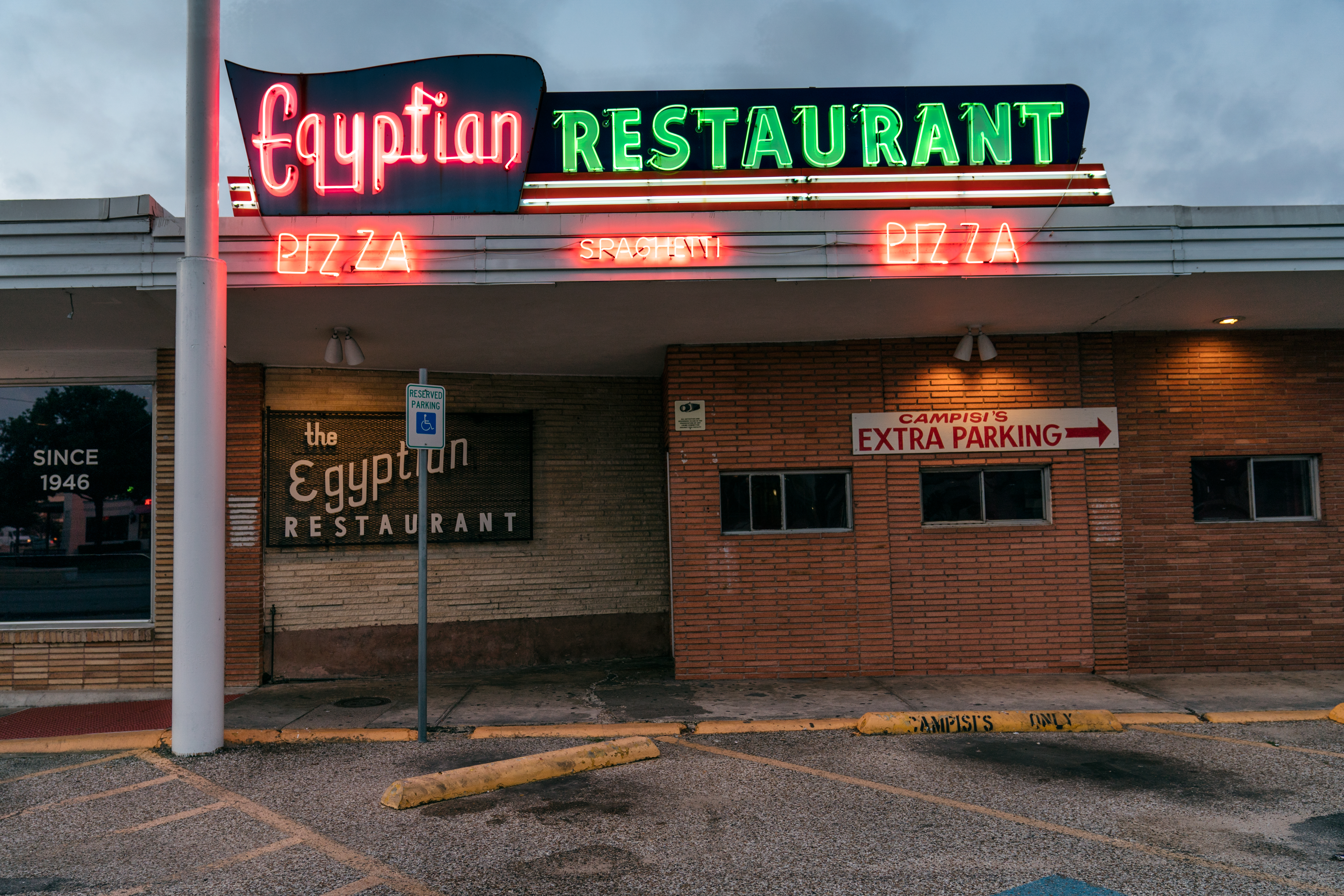
Original location in 2017

Carlos Campisi and his wife, Antonina Cammarata, emigrated from Sicily to the United States by boat in 1907. After starting in New Orleans, Louisiana to be with Antonina's brother, they moved to Dallas in 1916 and eventually had six children. In 1946, Carlos opened the Idle Hour Bar where he used a small kitchen in the back of the bar to make pizzas.

The current facility on Mockingbird Lane was founded as The Egyptian Lounge in 1946 by Johnny Brazil Grisaffi. Originally founded as a piano bar, Carlos purchased The Egyptian Lounge in 1950 and left most of the decor intact. Without enough money for a new sign, "Lounge" was removed and replaced with "Restaurant". According to a family member, Carlos purchased the business in order to get his sons Joe and Sam started in business after World War II and they were the ones who worked and developed the business.

The Los Angeles Times reported that the restaurant capitalized on a popular belief that one of its early owners, Joseph Campisi, was tied to organized crime and the assassination of President John F. Kennedy. Jack Ruby, the killer of Lee Harvey Oswald, frequented Campisi's and stopped for steak there the night before the assassination. Some who believe that Kennedy was killed due to conspiracy, such as Robert J. Groden and G. Robert Blakey, claim that Joseph Campisi was well-connected with the mafia, and that Ruby's association with Campisi means he was connected to organized crime, too. Family members acknowledged that Joseph Campisi was on friendly terms with Carlos Marcello and other gangsters who visited the restaurant, but denied he was involved in criminal activities. In 1979, the House Select Committee on Assassinations investigating the circumstances around Kennedy's death reported "it is clear that [Joseph Campisi] was an associate or friend of many Dallas-based organized crime members, particularly Joseph Civello, during the time he was the head of the Dallas organization" and that they found "no indication that Campisi had engaged in any specific organized crime-related activities."

On July 7, 1991, American League umpire Steve Palermo and former college and pro football player Terence Mann had been dining separately at Campisi's when they rushed outside with other patrons to break-up a robbery. While attempting to apprehend one of the perpetrators, Palermo was shot in the back and left partially paralyzed, and Mann was shot in the neck. Four men were arrested, including a 21-year-old Persian Gulf War veteran who was eventually sentenced to 75 years for the shooting.

== See also ==
- List of Italian restaurants
- List of restaurants in Dallas
