= Dippolito =

Dippolito may refer to:

- Dalia Dippolito, American criminal
- Joseph Dippolito (1914–1974), Italian American Mafia member
