= Joseph Ardizzone =

American mobster

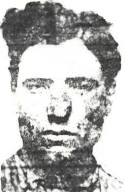
- Ardizzone's mug shot taken in 1914
- Born: Giuseppe Ernesto Ardizzone; November 19, 1884; Piana dei Greci, Sicily
- Disappeared: October 15, 1931 (aged 46); Etiwanda, California, U.S.
- Status: Missing for 94 years, 10 months and 2 days; later declared dead 1938 (aged 53–54)
- Other name: "Joe Iron Man"
- Occupation: Crime boss
- Spouse: Elsa Marie Ellenberger
- Parent: Antonino Ardizzone
- Relatives: George Ardizzone (brother); Frank Ardizzone (brother); Mary Ardizzone (Niece); Stephen Ardizzone
- Allegiance: Los Angeles crime family

Joseph "Joe Iron Man" Ardizzone (born Giuseppe Ernesto Ardizzone; Italian pronunciation: [dʒuˈzɛppe erˈnɛsto arditˈtsoːne]; November 19, 1884 – disappeared October 15, 1931, declared dead 1938) was an Italian-born early American mobster, who became the first Boss of the Los Angeles crime family. He was involved in a long-standing feud with the Matranga family. He once claimed to have killed 30 men.

== Early life ==
Ardizzone was born on November 19, 1884, in Piana dei Greci (today Piana degli Albanesi), in the Province of Palermo, Sicily, to Antonino Ardizzone. The Ardizzones were of Arbëreshë origin, being related to several other families and they would maintain contact in America. Those families included the Cuccias and the Matrangas.

== Early years in America ==
The Ardizzone family came to America at different times. Antonino came in the later 19th century, landing in Louisiana then taking the train to southern California. He became a wealthy farmer and winemaker. His other children, including Stefano and Francesco also moved to the Los Angeles area. Giuseppe was one of the last to arrive.

== Matranga feud ==
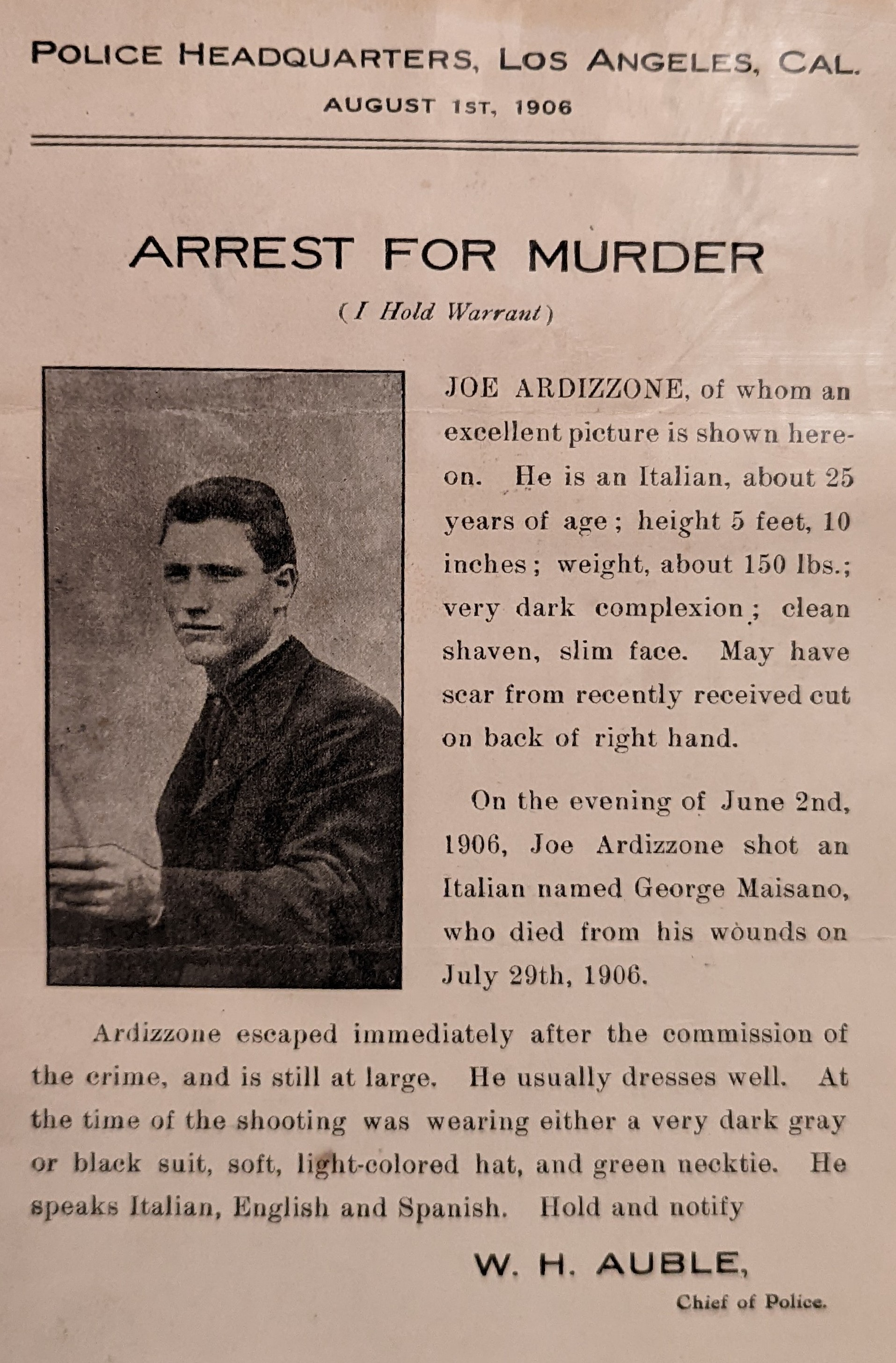
Joe Ardizzone wanted poster 1906

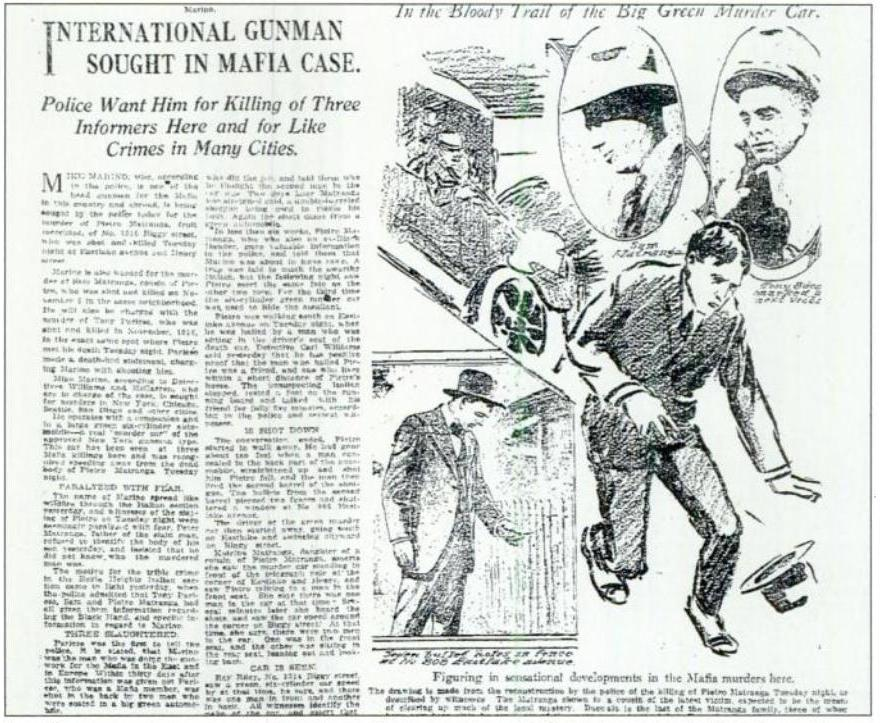
Los Angeles Times newspaper in 1917. Pictured in the top right corner are Sam Matranga and Tony Buccola. The drawing is a depiction of the murder of Pietro Matranga.

For reasons uncertain Giuseppe, who Americanized his name to Joseph, became involved in a dispute with the Matrangas who lived in Los Angeles. They were distant cousins from Piana dei Greci. In what he later called an act of self-defense, Joseph shot and killed a Matranga ally named George Maisano in 1906. He then fled California and hid in different states.

He eventually returned and was arrested, but the charges against him were dropped. In December 1914, he married Elsa Marie Ellenberger who was the daughter of a German neighbor in the city of Sunland, California, where they lived at that time. In court documents, she had also been referred to as Elsie A. Ardizzone. Shortly after that their home was burned down by arsonists.

Starting in 1917, three of the rival Matrangas were killed: Sam Matranga was shot in front of his home (1837 Darwin Avenue); his brother Pietro Matranga was also shot in front of his home (1510 Biggy Street) a month later. Then a relative of the Matrangas, Joseph LaPaglia, was also killed. On October 12, 1918, Tony Matranga fired a rifle at Stephen Ardizzone which hit his truck; Matranga was tried on a charge of assault with a deadly weapon.

== Later life ==
While it is uncertain when Ardizzone became a member of the Mafia, or even if his immediate family were members, he was in a leadership position in the early 1920s. Upon the resignation of Rosario DeSimone for unknown reasons, he became the next chief of the Los Angeles crime family.

During his time as boss, Prohibition was active and many, if not most, Mafiosi were involved in bootlegging. The Los Angeles Family was certainly active during this time period. On November 25, 1929, Los Angeles businessman Frank Baumgarteker "vanished" from Los Angeles. Ardizzone and his cousin Francesco "Frank" Borgia Vanished December 1951 were suspects in Baumgarteker's disappearance. Crime Boss Tony Buccola of the rival Matranga crime family hinted he knew who had caused his friend Baumgarteker's "disappearance"; Buccola himself "vanished" on May 6, 1930 from Los Angeles, California — the only trace of him was his wrecked car found on May 8, 1930 in Venice, California. The Wilmington Press Journal reported on June 3, 1930 that an unidentified skeleton had been found on a ranch in Brawley, California which could be Baumgarteker, Buccola, or Joe Porrazo, a "bottle store proprietor", who had disappeared the previous month. On September 15, 1930, Joseph W Neuman of San Bernardino, who owned a bottling company and was a partner of Baumgarteker, dared his wife to "race" him in their separate cars to their home; his wife found her husband's car in the driveway with the doors open and the keys still inside.

In 1931, when the Castellammarese War between Joseph Masseria and Salvatore Maranzano was taking place, the Los Angeles crime family may have supported Maranzano. Nick Gentile notes in his memoirs that during a conference, Maranzano was backed by two men from California. Joseph Bonanno (died 2002) and his son Salvatore Bonanno (died 2008) wrote of several close associates in the Los Angeles area, such as Jimmy Costa (from Castellammare del Golfo), Nick Guastella, Frank Bompensiero and Tony Mirabile.

It was also during this time that a faction developed that opposed Ardizzone. In March 1931 he was driving with his friend Vincenzo "Jimmy" Basile when gunmen drove by and shot at them. Basile was killed and Ardizzone wounded. Ardizzone managed to be taken to the house of Leon DeSimone, the physician son of former L.A. don Rosario DeSimone. He was treated and sent to a hospital. A second attempt was made on his life in the hospital, so his family came to act as bodyguards. Underworld sources indicated that he agreed to retire after these incidents.

The opposing faction (led by in particular, Jack Dragna, who had excellent connections with Lucky Luciano) apparently did not believe Ardizzone, and on October 15, 1931, while on his way to his cousin Nick Borgia's house in Etiwanda, driving a 1930 Ford Coupe and carrying a .41 caliber Colt revolver he was last seen picking up a man who had waved at him. An intense search followed, but his body was never found. After seven years, Ardizzone's wife had him declared legally dead. Police could not prove, but only speculate that the four missing men in 1929 and 1930 were connected to Ardizzone's vanishment. Jack Dragna became boss of the Los Angeles crime family until he died in 1956.

== See also ==
- List of people who disappeared

== Notes ==
American Mafia
Preceded by Rosario DeSimone (1922–1925)	Los Angeles crime family Boss; 1925–1931	Succeeded by Jack Dragna (1931–1956)
