= Frank DeSimone =

American lawyer

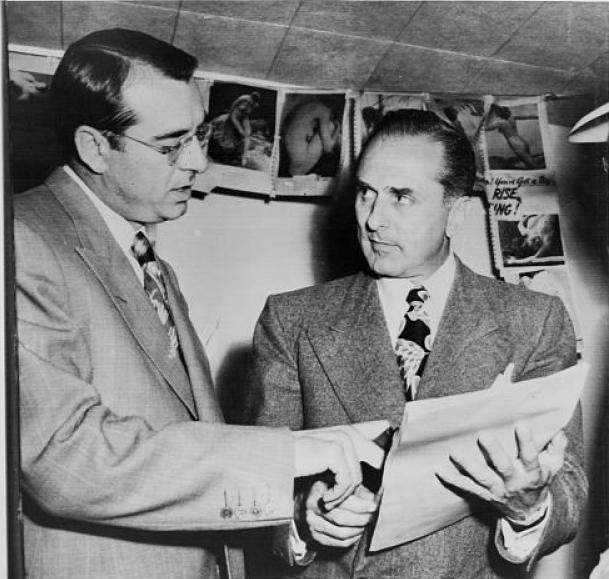
- DeSimone (left) with Johnny Roselli
- Born: July 17, 1909; Pueblo, Colorado, U.S.
- Died: August 4, 1967 (aged 58); Downey, California, U.S.
- Other name: "One Eye"
- Education: University of Southern California (LLB)
- Known for: Boss of the Los Angeles crime family (1956–1967)
- Father: Rosario DeSimone
- Relatives: Simone Scozzari (cousin); Joseph Civello (cousin)

Frank A. DeSimone (July 17, 1909 – August 4, 1967) was an American attorney and mobster who was boss of the Los Angeles crime family from 1956 to 1967. DeSimone was the son of former don Rosario DeSimone. He was sometime referred to as "One Eye" because one of his eyes drooped. He was also related to Simone Scozzari and Joseph Civello.

== Early life and education ==
Frank DeSimone was born in 1909 in Pueblo, Colorado. As a child, his family moved to Southern California. DeSimone graduated from the University of Southern California Law School.

== Career ==
After passing the California bar exam, DeSimone became a lawyer in May 1933. DeSimone also became involved in the mob, working to orchestrate one of the many botched assassination attempts on Mickey Cohen. Jimmy Fratianno signaled DeSimone after a meeting with Cohen and DeSimone pulled up in a car with Frank Bompensiero, Leo Moceri, and another armed man. By the time they got past Cohen's bodyguards, Cohen escaped. With his profession as an attorney, DeSimone was usually able to avoid police scrutiny. His legal career was no front job, however; in the 1940s and 1950s, DeSimone served as lawyer for mobsters such as Jimmy Fratianno and Johnny Roselli as well as providing legal aid to others.

After Jack Dragna died of a heart attack in 1956, DeSimone was elected the third official Boss of the Los Angeles crime family. Jimmy Fratianno believed DeSimone had rigged the election, and transferred to the Chicago Outfit after his release from prison a few years later. By all accounts, DeSimone was a strait-laced and sober character. One of his first acts as boss was attending the 1957 Apalachin mob convention along with Simone Scozzari. Russell Bufalino picked up Joseph Civello, Scozzari, and DeSimone at the Hotel New Yorker and took them to Casey Hotel in Scranton. The next morning he drove them to Apalachin for the meeting. When the large mob conference was raided by law enforcement, DeSimone was outed as a mobster, and his underboss was deported to Italy a few years later for being an illegal immigrant.

DeSimone is accused by some of ruining the Los Angeles family's reputation and integrity. Nonetheless, DeSimone was featured in Look Magazine in 1965 as one of the decade's notable figures in organized crime; DeSimone sued the magazine for libel. Jimmy Fratianno also blamed DeSimone in his 1953 extortion case for having been sent to Folsom prison on a six-year extortion conviction, after dealing with fellow con-artists James B. Modica (a man who 'bumped' slot machines and a liquor store owner in Tarzana) and Burbank liquor store owner Dominic Raspona. Jimmy Fratianno also accused DeSimone of ruining his extortion case defense case by not recording one of the defendant's key witnesses, a man who skipped town before being able to take the stand. DeSimone was later disbarred in California from practicing law because of his criminal activities.

In the 1960s, Joseph Bonanno, in a plot to take over The Commission, plotted the murder of Mafia bosses Thomas Lucchese, Carlo Gambino, and Stefano Magaddino, and then added DeSimone to the list for good measure. Although never carried out, DeSimone didn't learn about that plan until after it was thwarted. This caused DeSimone to become very paranoid.

== Personal life ==
During the later part of his life, he never went out during night, and lived with his elderly mother in middle class Downey, California.

DeSimone died of a heart attack at the age of 58. After DeSimone's death, Nick Licata, DeSimone's third underboss, was named the next Los Angeles Boss.

American Mafia
Preceded by Jack Dragna (1931-1956)	Los Angeles crime family Boss; 1956-1967	Succeeded by Nick Licata (1967-1974)
