= Joseph Dippolito =

Italian American Mafia member in the Los Angeles crime family

- Mugshot of Dippolito
- Born: December 28, 1914; New York City, New York, U.S.
- Died: January 14, 1974 (aged 59); Pomona, California, U.S.
- Other names: Joe Dip
- Spouse: Frances Dippolito
- Relatives: Philip F Dippolito -Philadelphia 1950

Joseph Charles Dippolito (December 28, 1914 – January 14, 1974), also well known as Joe Dip, was an Italian American Mafia member in the Los Angeles crime family. The son of fellow Mafioso Salvatore Charles Dippolito (known as Charlie Dip), Joe Dip rose to become underboss of the Los Angeles crime family. He was featured in the book The Last Mafioso by Ovid Demaris.

== Biography ==
Joseph Dippolito was born on December 28, 1914, in Brooklyn, New York, to Salvatore Charles and Angelina Dippolito. His father was well known as Charlie Dip. During Prohibition, Joseph Dippolito served a one-year prison sentence for illegally transporting liquor, which was a felony. After his release from prison, Joe Dippolito moved from New York to Fontana, near San Bernardino, California, where his parents had moved to. Eventually, the family made large profits selling diamonds bought during the Great Depression at bargain prices from New York, in Ontario, and Los Angeles, California. Joe Dippolito and his father Charlie, and other family members, soon started and owned several successful businesses on Fourth Street, including a liquor and market store, a hotel, and extensive wine vineyards in what is now Rancho Cucamonga. The Dippolitos became prominent and powerful men in the Inland Empire. The Dippolitos were involved in many real estate land deals and produced various grapes for winemakers in California.

Later, Joe Dippolito proved to be a competent Mafia killer. He was a big, muscular man who Jimmy Fratianno said was "built like a heavyweight wrestler". In September 1949, Fratianno was ordered by Jack Dragna to set up and kill Mickey Cohen loyalist Frank Niccoli, who was free on bail. Jimmy invited Niccoli to his Westchester home over Labor Day 1949 for a beer. Fratianno initially tried to get Niccoli to end his long-time loyalty to mob boss Mickey Cohen. When that effort did not work, Fratianno knew Niccoli would be killed. A few minutes later, "surprised" with a knock at his door, Jimmy answered it. Jimmy invited in his new guest, who was Joe Dip. Leaving the front door part way open, in a friendly voice, Jimmy asked Niccoli, "Have you ever met Joe Dip?" Niccolli said no and rose up to shake Joe Dip's hand. Dippolito shook Niccoli's hand and then quickly wrapped him in a reverse bear hug. Fratianno and Sam Bruno, who had also rushed into the house, both placed a rope around Niccoli's neck and choked him to death. Afterwards, Fratianno said Dippolito took Niccoli's body, and buried it with a sack of lime in his large wine grape vineyard in what is now Rancho Cucamonga, California. The Dippolito grape vineyards were a popular place for the L.A. Mafia to bury bodies of their murder victims. This method of killing with a rope was termed by the Mafia as the "Italian rope trick". A few years later this killing move was repeated on former Tahoe Village casino owner Louis (Russian Louie) Strauss in April 1953, with Dippolito holding Strauss in a bear hug, while Fratianno and Frank Bompensiero strangled Strauss with a rope.

In 1952, Dippolito became a made man in the Los Angeles crime family, serving under L.A. mob boss Jack Dragna. The mob swearing-in ceremony took place at the Dippolito vineyard in Ontario. He was initially a soldier, working in Jimmy Fratianno's crew. Joseph's father Charlie had been inducted into the L.A. family five years earlier. When Nick Licata became boss of the Los Angeles mob family in 1967, he promoted Dippolito to underboss.

On January 31, 1969, Joe Dippolito was indicted in a Los Angeles court on three counts of perjury for false statements he made during a liquor license inquiry on May 16, 1968. He was released on $10,000 bail and scheduled to be arraigned. On May 17, 1969, he was convicted on two of the three perjury charges. On June 10, 1969, Dippolito was sentenced to five years for each charge (10 years total). A $10,000 bond allowed him to remain free pending appeal of his conviction. It was during this time that law enforcement recognized 'Joe Dip' as the underboss of the Los Angeles family. On April 16, 1971, his prison sentence was reduced from ten to five years by Judge Warren J. Ferguson, and he started serving his sentence. On December 13, 1971, Dippolito was paroled after serving eight months in state prison. Joe Dip was released from prison after San Bernardino Mayor Al C. Ballard, Police Chief Louis J. Fortuna, and California Superior Court Judge Joseph A. Katz vouched for Dippolito in glowing letters written in 1969 to a probation officer.

Joseph Dippolito died on January 14, 1974, from a heart attack at his daughter Josephine's wedding. He had been in poor health and had been hospitalized about three months earlier, because of a long-time heart condition. He was interred at Bellevue Cemetery and Mausoleum in Ontario, California.

== Notes ==
American Mafia
Preceded by Nick Licata	Los Angeles crime family Underboss; 1967-1974	Succeeded by Dominic Brooklier
