= Joseph Campisi =

20th-century American mafia leader and businessman

- Born: 11 October 1918; Dallas, Texas, U.S.
- Died: 12 January 1990 (aged 71); Dallas, Texas
- Other names: Joe Campisi; "Egyptian Joe"
- Occupations: Restaurateur (The Egyptian Lounge)
- Years active: 1960s—1990
- Known for: Dallas mafia boss
- Spouse: Edith
- Children: 4

Joseph Campisi, also known as "Egyptian Joe", was an American restaurateur who ran The Egyptian Lounge. Campisi was the head of the Dallas mafia from the 1970s until his death in 1990.

== Biography ==
Campisi was born on 11 October 1918 in Dallas, Texas.

Campisi was the underboss to then head of the Dallas mafia, Joseph Civello. He accompanied him when he travelled to New York to attend the Apalachin meeting in 1957. After Civello's successor Joe Ianni died in 1973, Campisi succeeded him as head of the mafia in Dallas. Campisi and his brother Sam were associated with Carlos Marcello and made trips to New Orleans where they would socialize with members of the Marcello crime family, including Marcello's brothers. Every Christmas he sent Marcello 260 pounds of Italian sausage. He also attended the wedding of Michael Marcello. Through Campisi, Vincent LoScalzo attempted to strengthen ties between the Trafficante crime family and Marcello.

Campisi became acquainted with R. D. Matthews after he and his brother purchased The Idle Bar where Matthews worked. In subsequent years he would accompany Campisi on his trips to Las Vegas. Other friends included Benny Binion and Henry Wade, the District Attorney of Dallas for 30 years. Campisi had contacts with both judicial and law enforcement persons in Dallas. He was reportedly acquainted with state judges and officials in the Dallas County District Attorney's office. When William Decker was set to step down as Dallas Sheriff, Campisi hoped that Clarence Jones would serve as his replacement, as it would have meant that his bookmaking operations could have continued unhindered. Campisi was never convicted of any offence; although he was arrested for murder in 1944, which the grand jury found was self-defense.

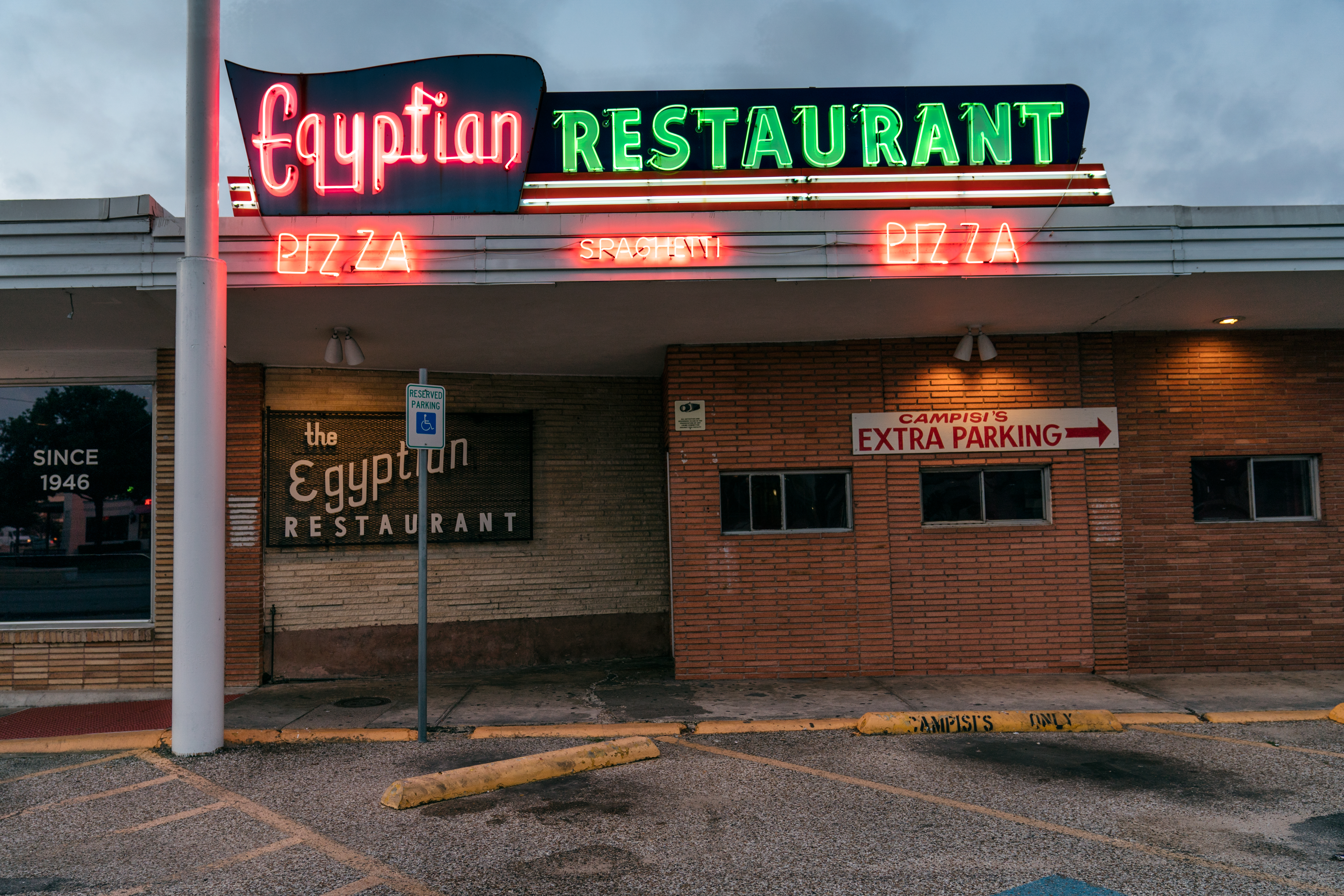
The Egyptian Lounge in 2017

He inherited The Egyptian Lounge when his father Carlo died. Civello was a frequent visitor to the restaurant; as was Jack Ruby, the killer of Lee Harvey Oswald. Ruby was a friend of Campisi's and Campisi was likewise a visitor to Ruby's strip club. Ruby dined at Campisi's restaurant the night before Kennedy was assassinated and Campisi was later Ruby's first visitor in jail. Campisi was interviewed by the FBI on 7 December 1963 but was not called to testify before the Warren Commission. However he did provide a deposition to the House Select Committee on Assassinations on 29 May 1978.

Campisi married Edith and they had four children. He died at his restaurant on 12 January 1990 from a heart attack, aged 71. Descendants of Joseph Campisi have built The Egyptian Lounge into a pizzeria chain, called Campisi's Restaurant.
