= Steve Palermo =

American baseball umpire (1949–2017)

- Born: Stephen Michael Palermo; October 9, 1949; Worcester, Massachusetts, U.S.
- Died: May 14, 2017 (aged 67); Overland Park, Kansas, U.S.
- Education: Norwich University
- Occupation: MLB umpire
- Years active: 1977–1991

Stephen Michael Palermo (October 9, 1949 – May 14, 2017) was an American umpire in Major League Baseball who worked in the American League from 1977 to 1991. His field career ended when he was shot in the back following his decision to intervene and apprehend the assailants in an altercation outside Campisi's, a Dallas Italian restaurant. He wore uniform number 14 when the American League began using uniform numbers for its umpires in 1980, and the number was never reassigned to another AL umpire until after the AL and NL umpire staffs were unified by MLB in 2000.

== Biography ==
=== Early life and education ===
Steve Palermo was born on October 9, 1949, in Worcester, Massachusetts. He studied education at Norwich University, Leicester Junior College and Worcester State College. While in school, he worked as a baseball umpire. Barney Deary, who headed Major League Baseball's Umpire Development Program, discovered Palermo working a Little League all-star game. As a result, Palermo entered the league's development program where he trained for five years.

=== Umpiring career ===
His career as an umpire includes the 1983 World Series, three American League Championship Series (1980, 1982, and 1989), the 1981 American League Division Series and the 1986 All-Star Game. In August 1991, The Sporting News ranked Palermo "Number 1" among American League umpires for overall performance. His first game as an umpire was the Toronto Blue Jays first ever game on April 7, 1977, at Exhibition Stadium. Palermo was the third base umpire for that game.

Palermo was one of the first American League umpires to never use the outside chest protector. Starting in 1977, all new AL umpires had to adopt the inside chest protector, which had been used in the National League for decades under the guidance of Hall of Fame umpire Bill Klem. AL umpires on staff prior to 1977 were grandfathered and could continue to use the outside protector. Among those umpires with Palermo in the AL Class of '77 were Durwood Merrill and Vic Voltaggio.

His career highlights also include umpiring two of the most famous games between the New York Yankees and the Boston Red Sox. In 1978, he worked the Yankees' one-game playoff against the Boston Red Sox in Fenway Park to determine the AL's Eastern Division winner. Palermo, serving as the third base umpire, signaled "fair ball" when Bucky Dent hit the game-changing home run. On July 4, 1983, Palermo worked behind the plate for Dave Righetti's no-hitter against the Red Sox at Yankee Stadium. Palermo was one of the umpires who caught Minnesota Twin pitcher Joe Niekro in the act of scuffing a baseball on August 3, 1987, in a game at Anaheim Stadium.

Steve Palermo provided the umpire's voice in Ken Griffey Jr. Presents Major League Baseball, a 1994 Super NES baseball video game.

Palermo was frequently the target of fiery Baltimore Orioles' manager Earl Weaver's wrath. Jim Palmer, Hall of Fame Oriole pitcher, remembered that Weaver "second-, third-, and fourth-guessed every call Steve Palermo ever made in his whole career, which, by the law of averages seems a little harsh, since he had a one out of two chance on every pitch."

==== 1991 shooting and recovery ====
On July 7, 1991, he and several friends, including fellow umpire Rich Garcia, were dining at Campisi's Egyptian Restaurant in Dallas after working a Texas Rangers game when they were alerted that two waitresses were being mugged in the parking lot. In an attempt to apprehend the assailants, he suffered a bullet wound to his spinal cord, resulting in instant paralysis from the waist down. Palermo's umpiring career ended, and doctors told Palermo and his wife, Debbie, that he would probably never walk again. Through rehabilitation and determination, Palermo managed to recover, walking with the use of one small leg brace and a cane. He subsequently threw the ceremonial first pitch in Game 1 of the 1991 World Series, only three months after suffering his injury.

=== Later life ===
Bud Selig hired Palermo as a special assistant in 1994 and, in 2000, elevated him as a supervisor of umpiring for the league. From 1995 to 1997, Palermo worked part-time as an analyst for Yankees games on MSG Network.

Palermo died of lung cancer on May 14, 2017, in Overland Park, Kansas at the age of 67.

== Honors ==
In 2003, Palermo began serving as the Honorary Chairman of Assurant Employee Benefits' WillReturn Council. The Council annually presents the Shining Star of Perseverance Award to individuals who overcome disabilities. Palermo was also an honorary inductee into the Perseverance Hall of Fame.

In 1994, he won the Arthur Ashe Courage Award.

Palermo served as honorary commissioner for the Tee Ball game at the White House on July 24, 2005, in which children with physical disabilities participated; the game was part of President George W. Bush's White House Tee Ball Initiative.

At the 2012 All-Star Game in Kansas City, Palermo accompanied the umpiring crew to the plate for special recognition.
