= Dallas crime family =

American Mafia crime family

- Founded: c. 1910; 116 years ago
- Founder: Carlo Piranio
- Founding location: Dallas, Texas, United States
- Years active: c. 1910–1990
- Territory: Primarily the Dallas metropolitan area, with additional territory throughout Texas, Oklahoma and Arkansas
- Ethnicity: Italians as "made men" and other ethnicities as associates
- Membership (est.): 12 made members (1950s)
- Activities: Racketeering, gambling, bookmaking, loansharking, extortion, corruption, drug trafficking, bootlegging, fencing, fraud, skimming, money laundering, prostitution, assault, and murder
- Allies: Chicago Outfit; Genovese crime family; Kansas City crime family; New Orleans crime family; Trafficante crime family
- Rivals: Various gangs in the Dallas area

The Dallas crime family, also known as the Civello crime family or the Dallas Mafia, was an Italian-American Mafia crime family based in Dallas, Texas. Founded in the early 1920s, the organization was among the smallest Mafia families in the United States, with a peak membership of less than a dozen "made men" during the 1940s and '50s. The Dallas family operated illegal liquor, narcotics, gambling and fencing rackets within its territory, which reached as far as Houston, Galveston, Fort Worth and Austin, as well as Oklahoma and Arkansas. The Dallas family maintained close ties to the New Orleans and Kansas City families.

== History ==
=== The Piranio brothers ===
The Mafia in Dallas was formed by mafiosi from Corleone, Sicily who had moved to the area from New Orleans in the early 20th century. The founding members of the Dallas crime family were the brothers Carlo and Giuseppe "Joe" Piranio. The Piranio brothers immigrated to the United States circa 1889 and initially arrived in New York City, establishing themselves among the mafiosi of Upper Manhattan. They then settled in Shreveport, Louisiana and maintained ties to the New Orleans underworld before moving to Dallas in the early 1900s. With the backing of fellow Corleonese Giuseppe "the Clutch Hand" Morello, boss of the Morello crime family in New York, the brothers founded the Dallas faction of the American Mafia, with Carlo elected boss of the organization and Joseph installed as his underboss.

The marriage of Carlo Piranio, later described as the "original head of the Mafia in Texas," to an eighteen-year-old woman, recently arrived from Italy, occurred in 1903. In 1904, a son, Angelo, was born to Carlo and Clementia Piranio. The Piranio relocation to Dallas occurred sometime between the marriage and the Shreveport birth of Angelo in 1904. The April 1910 U.S. Census says the family lived temporarily at 774 Main Street in Dallas. The household included Carlo and Clementia, young Angelo, and Joseph Piranio and his new bride Lena. Carlo ran a real estate business from his home. Joseph worked as a grocery salesman. Joseph was not entirely settled in Texas. He moved back to Louisiana for a few years. He, his wife and two young daughters returned to Dallas by 1914.

Carlo died of natural causes in 1930. Joseph took over the family after Carlo's death. He owned a number of bars, controlled numerous gambling operations, and ran some minor labor rackets through his construction business.

The family engaged in gambling, fencing stolen goods, and narcotics trafficking, but only on a minor scale as organized crime in Dallas was dominated by non-Italian gangsters.

=== Joseph Civello ===
Joseph Civello was born in 1902, in rural West Baton Rouge Parish, Louisiana. He was the second child born to Philip and Catherine Civello. His father, a farm laborer, had been in the United States since 1900. The Civello family grew to include seven children. The family remained in West Baton Rouge until 1923, when Philip relocated the clan to Dallas and opened a grocery store.

Civello married in November 1929. He and his wife Mary moved into Philip Civello's home at 1902 Moser Avenue. Joseph worked as a salesman for his father's grocery store.

Law enforcement officers quickly became aware of Joseph Civello. He was convicted of Prohibition violations in 1926 and served forty days in jail. On July 12, 1928, Civello was again arrested on liquor charges. His arrest was part of a series of raids that nabbed a total of twenty-two suspected bootleggers around the city. Civello was arrested on St. Paul Street with two other men, Ernest Calchano and Joe DeCarlo. DeCarlo was an important bootlegger in the Dallas area and had recently begun refusing to send tribute payments to Carlo Piranio. Civello was selected to administer Mafia discipline.

Just two days after their arrest together, Civello and DeCarlo met inside the St. Paul Drugstore at the intersection of St. Paul and Bryan Streets. Civello happened to be carrying a loaded shotgun at the time. As the men stood close to each other, the shotgun went off. DeCarlo was shot in the stomach. Rather than flee, Civello remained with the mortally wounded DeCarlo, protesting that his weapon had fired by accident. DeCarlo, with his dying breath, confirmed Civello's story.

Civello was arrested and charged with murder. He continued to insist that the killing was accidental. A Dallas grand jury gave considerable weight to DeCarlo's dying statement. Within two days, Civello was released on his own recognizance. The grand jury continued its investigation into DeCarlo's death and decided on July 27 not to indict Civello.

Joseph Civello assumed control in 1956, when Joseph Piranio died at age 78. Civello attended the infamous Apalachin Meeting of Mafia leaders in 1957, a time when he controlled narcotics, gambling, prostitution and night clubs in most of Texas. After the Apalachin Meeting, the FBI began keeping closer tabs on Civello. On January 13, 1960, Civello was indicted for conspiracy and perjury offenses. Judge Irving R. Kaufman sentenced him and nineteen other mob leaders that were at Apalachin to five years in prison. Ten months later, a U.S. Appeals Court overturned the convictions of the twenty men. Prosecutors had proven conspiracy, the court decided, but had not proven that the conspiracy was designed to accomplish some unlawful act.

Beginning in the 1960s the family saw some degree of notoriety when Jack Ruby shot Lee Harvey Oswald, as Ruby was a friend of Civello.

=== Post-Civello ===
After Civello's death in 1970, some law enforcement intelligence officers surmised that local restaurant owner Joseph Ianni, a long-time friend of Civello, became head of the organization. Ianni's only legal trouble was a 1946 liquor law violation and he was reported only to have nothing more than a "vague association" with Marcello. According to D Magazine, he "had fewer direct ties to New Orleans than Civello, only what some intelligence officers call 'friend of a friend of a friend' relationships".

Ianni was succeeded by Joseph Campisi. Campisi had much closer ties with the Marcello family. He and his brother Sam made trips to New Orleans where they would socialize with members of the Marcello family, including Marcello's brothers. Campisi attended the wedding of Michael Marcello. Through Campisi, Vincent LoScalzo attempted to strengthen ties between the Trafficante crime family and Marcello.

== Historical leadership ==
=== Boss ===
- c. 1910–1930 — Carlo Piranio — died on February 20, 1930
- 1930–1956 — Giuseppe "Joe" Piranio — committed suicide on October 27, 1956
- 1956–1970 — Joseph "Joe" Civello — died on January 17, 1970
- 1970–1973 — Joseph "Little Joe" Ianni — died on May 29, 1973
- 1973–1990 — Joseph "Papa Joe" Campisi — died on January 12, 1990

=== Underboss ===
- 1921–1949 — Peter DeLuca — died
- 1949–1959 — Charles Vincent Satarino — died on November 21, 1959
- 1959–1973 — Joseph "Papa Joe" Campisi — became boss

=== Consigliere ===
- 1921–1925 — Chiro LaBarba — died
- 1925–1957 — Francesco "Frank" Ianni — died
- 1957–1966 — Rosario "Ross" Musso — died

== Former members ==
- Philip "Bump" Bosco — born in 1911. Bosco had served as at least a soldier for the Dallas family, heavily active in illegal gambling, and was primarily active during the 1950s and 1970s. According to information by informants, Bosco and his associate, Norvelle Stanfield, had owned a 25% stake each in their gambling operation. Bosco died in 1974.
- Joseph "Papa Joe" Campisi — born in 1917. Campisi served as the last boss of the Dallas family, and was active since the 1940s until his death in January 1990, dying at the age of 72. Prior to his death, Campisi operated and controlled the Egyptian Lounge, a restaurant located at on East Mockingbird Lane, in Dallas, Texas.
- Anthony Francis "Tony" Caterine — Caterine was a soldier for the Dallas family. Ceterine owned at least two nightclubs in the Dallas nightclub entertainment area, The Loser's Club located on 5436 E Mockingbird Lane, and the Castaway Bar located on 5600 Mockingbird Lane. It is believed Caterine was once associated with Jack Ruby, the man who shot the Lee Harvey Oswald.
- Nick Cascio — born in 1915. Cascio was a Dallas family soldier, specialising in safe cracking. It is believed Cascio was inducted into the Dallas family in 1961. Cascio died in 1981.
- Joseph Francis "Joe" Civello — former boss. In July 1928, Civello shot and killed bootlegger Joseph DeCarlo with a sawed-off shotgun at the St. Paul pharmacy on the orders of family boss Carlo Piranio due to DeCarlo's refusal to pay tribute to the crime family. He was charged with murder but exonerated after claiming that the shooting was accidental.
- Vincent Vallone — born in 1884. Vallone was a capo in the Dallas family. Vallone was shot by two shotgun blasts and killed in July 1946 in a drive-by shooting in Houston, Texas, at the age of 64.
- Carlo T. "Calogero" Piranio — former boss. Piranio was born in Corleone, Sicily on May 8, 1876 and immigrated to the U.S. around 1889. After living in New York City, Piranio relocated to Shreveport, Louisiana in 1901, before again moving to Dallas, where he became the founding boss of the crime family. In 1919, Piranio was arrested for receiving and concealing $2,500 worth of stolen liberty bonds. Piranio died from cancer of the spinal cord on February 20, 1930, aged 53. He was succeeded as family boss by his younger brother, Joseph.
- Giuseppe "Joe" Piranio — former boss. Piranio committed suicide on October 27, 1956. Joseph Civello subsequently became boss of the family.

== List of murders committed by the Dallas crime family ==
Name	Date	Reason
Joseph "Joe" DeCarlo	July 14, 1928	DeCarlo was ordered killed by Carlo Piranio for refusing to pay tribute from his rackets to the Dallas Mafia. He was shotgunned by Joseph Civello at the St. Paul drug store.

== See also ==
- Benny Binion

General:

- Crime in Texas
- List of Italian Mafia crime families
