= Simone Scozzari =

Sicilian American mobster

Simone "Sam" Scozzari (January 7, 1900 – 1980s) was a Sicilian mobster and a member of the American Mafia in Los Angeles. He served as a soldier in the Los Angeles crime family during the 1940s and 1950s. When Frank DeSimone became boss of the L.A. crime family in 1956, he promoted Scozzari underboss.

Scozzari was born on January 7, 1900, in the city of Palermo in Sicily to Salvatore and Rosa Scozzari. He had one brother Frank, and two sisters, Anna and Josephine. He entered the United States illegally in 1923 and eventually made his way west to Los Angeles. His residence while in California was 3056 Sullivan Avenue in Rosemead, California. During his time in Los Angeles, he was arrested several times for illegal bookmaking and once for obstruction of justice. He was also involved in one of the unsuccessful attempts on Mickey Cohen's life. In 1958 he married Theresa Macri (who was 32 years his junior), but the couple had no children. He was also distantly related to Frank DeSimone. He owned the Venetian Club in Los Angeles, but was forced to close it down in 1958. He also had large real estate holdings.

On November 14, 1957, Scozzari and DeSimone travelled across the country to attend the Apalachin Meeting. Russell Bufalino picked up Scozzari, Joseph Civello, and Frank DeSimone at the Hotel New Yorker and took them to Casey Hotel in Scranton. The next morning he drove them to Apalachin for the meeting. When the meeting was raided by police, Scozzari was put on trial and ordered in 1958 to be deported for entering the country illegally. When investigated, Scozzari said he had been unemployed for 20 years and that he was a retired businessman, despite being arrested with $602 in cash and $8,445.30 in cashier's checks. Scozzari filed an appeal to stay in the country, but was denied. On June 13, 1962, he left the U.S. and landed in Rome before moving back to Palermo.

== Notes ==
American Mafia
| Preceded by Momo Adamo | Los Angeles crime family Underboss; 1956-1962 | Succeeded by Nick Licata |
