= Rosario DeSimone =

Italian-American crime family leader

- Born: 11 December 1873; Salaparuta, Sicily, Italy
- Died: 15 July 1946 (aged 72); Downey, California, US
- Other names: The Chief
- Known for: Mobster
- Spouse: Rosalie DeSimone
- Children: 3, including Frank DeSimone

Rosario DeSimone (Italian pronunciation: [roˈzaːrjo desiˈmoːne]; 11 December 1873 – 15 July 1946) was the head of an Italian American crime family during the 1920s to 1940s that was the predecessor to the Los Angeles crime family of the American Mafia. Rosario was the father of the future California mob boss Frank DeSimone. He is not to be confused with the Chicago Italian Timothy Rosario DeSimone.

== Biography ==
DeSimone was born in Salaparuta, Sicily, Italy, on 11 December 1873. After immigrating to the United States, he initially settled in New Orleans before moving to Pueblo, Colorado. In Pueblo he was part of that city's Mafia organization. He became a close ally of Vito Di Giorgio in Los Angeles. Upon Di Giorgio's death in Chicago in 1922, DeSimone took power. His empire spanned over Los Angeles County. His rule in Los Angeles was brief, and he stepped down around 1925. He later became a legitimate businessman who settled in Downey, California. DeSimone died of natural causes in 1946 and is buried in Calvary Cemetery.

=== Family ===
DeSimone married twice and fathered several children. His second son, Frank DeSimone, became a criminal attorney and later don of the crime family, reigning from 1956 to 1967.

American Mafia
Preceded by Vito Di Giorgio (1920-1922)	Los Angeles crime family Boss; 1922-c1925	Succeeded by Joseph Ardizzone (1925-1931)
