= Vito Di Giorgio =

American mobster

- Born: March 19, 1880; Borgetto, Sicily, Italy
- Died: May 13, 1922 (aged 42); Chicago, Illinois, U.S.
- Cause of death: Murder
- Known for: Gangster, mafia boss
- Spouse: Maria Cristoforo (m. 1909)

Vito Di Giorgio (Italian pronunciation: [ˈviːto di ˈdʒordʒo]; March 19, 1880 – May 13, 1922) was an Italian-born crime boss based in Los Angeles. Originally from Palermo, Sicily, Di Giorgio lived most of his life as a grocer in New Orleans, where he was also an active Black Hander. While he lived in Los Angeles, he was known as a wealthy food importer. He survived two shootings, only to be killed while visiting Chicago in 1922.

== Early life and New Orleans ==
Born to Filippo Di Giorgio and Giuseppa Casabianca in Borgetto, Sicily, in 1880, Di Giorgio came to the United States around 1904. After a brief stay in New York City with his reported cousin, he moved to New Orleans. There, he married Maria Cristoforo on April 23, 1909, and joined the community of organized criminals. He was acknowledged as a cousin and a friend to New York City Mafia boss Giuseppe Morello, and with this connection became a leading Black Hander. It is not known when he joined the Honored Society; he may have been a member in Sicily. Using the alias of Joseph Caronia, he was arrested in 1908 for extortion. He was the leader of a Black Hand group that sent an extortion letter demanding money from a leading Italian grocer. He signed the letter "King of the Mafia." He and his associates were freed after a short stay in jail due to lack of evidence. Further investigation showed that Di Giorgio killed a man, Joseph Campisciano, in self-defense about a year earlier. He had used the name Caronia at that time too.

In 1914 he became the owner of a grocery and saloon that was sold to him by the brother of the original proprietor. It had been a successful business and the press did not understand why the owner would sell it. It is likely that the owner, Henry Sciambra, was forced to sell. Sciambra's brother Anthony, the original owner, was murdered in 1912 by an intruder while he was in his home sleeping.

Even for a powerful Mafioso, life could be dangerous. Di Giorgio was shot and almost fatally wounded by an assassin on May 13, 1916. He recovered, but an associate who was in the saloon with him did not fare so well and died soon after. One of Di Giorgio's men was captured after he fired at the shooter and was found to have a letter from Frank Sicola of St. Louis. Sicola was a St. Louis Black Hand leader who was shot and killed in 1922. This is evidence of the connections early Mafiosi had, a network that remained unknown to the public until the 1957 Apalachin meeting.

Four years later Di Giorgio was alleged to have masterminded a robbery to some acquaintances that led to the death of Dallas Colmes, an Independence restaurant owner, on May 7, 1921. This resulted in the infamous hanging of the six men responsible in 1924.

== Life in Los Angeles ==
In 1920 Di Giorgio and his family were renting a house at 1017 East 21st Street in central Los Angeles. Nicola Gentile, who was a Mafia leader in Pittsburgh and several other cities, noted that he was feared throughout California. Nevertheless, Di Giorgio continued to have enemies and was shot a second time, on July 18, 1921, after returning home from a trip to the beach with his family. He was shot in the leg and recovered. Di Giorgio, described as a "wealthy fruit dealer," and his wife both told LAPD officers that he had no enemies and did not know who shot him or why.

Apparently not long after this incident, Gentile (who noted Di Giorgio's leg injury) visited him in the home of Rosario DeSimone. Gentile was on a mission to remove a "death sentence" placed on his compare, Vincenzo Chiappetta. Gentile did not know the reason for the death sentence on Chiappetta, only that it concerned an unresolved issue between the two of them. Chiappetta was one of the men arrested with Di Giorgio in 1908, and was now a member of the Kansas City crime family. Before meeting Di Giorgio, Gentile transferred his membership from the Cola Schiro crime family in Brooklyn (Salvatore Maranzano's predecessor), to the San Francisco Mafia organization. From there arrangements were made to meet with Di Giorgio. When they did meet, it was cordial and respectful. In the end, Gentile was successful in convincing Di Giorgio to drop the death sentence, and a letter of explanation was sent to the Kansas City leader Paolo DiGiovanni.

== Death ==
Nothing was heard of Di Giorgio until May 13, 1922. He and a friend from New Orleans, Vincenzo "James" Cammarata Lo Cascio, had been traveling the country, most recently in Buffalo, New York. Shortly before their visit, a number of organized crime figures and bootleggers were killed in the Buffalo area. From there they went to Chicago. While the purpose of their meeting is unknown, it is likely that they met with Chicago Mafia leader Michele Merlo, who was also president of the Chicago chapter of the Unione Siciliana. On May 13, Di Giorgio, Lo Cascio, and an unidentified third man, went to a barber shop and pool hall on Larabee Street. While Di Giorgio was in a barber's chair for a shave and a haircut, and Lo Cascio was playing a game of billiards, two or three gunmen entered the shop, walked up to both men from behind and shot and killed them both. Their deaths were reported not only in Chicago, but in New Orleans and even by The New York Times. However, none of the Los Angeles papers reported on the killings.

== Legacy ==
When Vito Di Giorgio was killed in Chicago the rest of his family had already returned to New Orleans. His wife struggled and was arrested for bootlegging a year later. She died in 1933. Rosario DeSimone succeeded Di Giorgio as the Los Angeles boss, but appears to have stepped down in the mid-1920s. Michele Merlo, known as the peacemaker among the warring Chicago bootlegging factions, died of cancer in 1924. Paolo DiGiovanni died in 1929. Vincenzo Chiappetta relocated to St. Louis, where he died in 1970 at the age of 83. Nick Gentile fled the country in 1937 to avoid prosecution for drug trafficking and remained in Italy for the rest of his life. He lived to be in his 90s.

== See also ==
- List of homicides in Illinois § Organized crime

American Mafia
Preceded by unknown (?-c1920)	Los Angeles crime family Boss c1920-1922	Succeeded by Rosario DeSimone (1922-c1925)
