= Joseph Civello =

American mobster who headed the Dallas mafia

Joseph "Joe" Civello
- Born: February 1902; Baton Rouge, Louisiana
- Died: 17 January 1970 (aged 67); Dallas, Texas
- Other name: "Joe"
- Occupation: Mafia boss
- Relatives: Frank DeSimone (cousin)
- Allegiance: Dallas crime family
- Convictions: Narcotics trafficking (1936), Conspiracy (1959, overturned)

Joseph Francis Civello (February 3, 1902 – January 17, 1970) was an American mobster and the boss of the Dallas crime family from 1956 until his death in 1970. It is also known as the "Civello crime family", making it his namesake.

== Early life ==
Civello was born in Baton Rouge, Louisiana. He was related to Frank DeSimone of the Dragna crime family in Los Angeles. Civello's first arrest occurred in July 1928 after he shot Joe DeCarlo with a shotgun outside St. Paul Drugstore. In the same year he was convicted of violating the liquor law and served forty days in county jail.

Civello was an expert marksman and regularly participated in skeet shooting competitions as a longtime member of the Dallas Gun and Skeet Club.

By the early 1930s, Civello had organized a crew (dubbed The Civello Gang by the Dallas Morning News) which included cousins Sam Civello, Louis Civello, Leon Civello, Frank Ianni, and Joe Cascio, among others. The gang operated as associates of Dallas' Piranio crime family, and was involved primarily with bootlegging and narcotics trafficking.

A 1936 US Government report recorded that Civello and Frank Ianni "have for many years been known as important illegal narcotic dealers in the Southwest but had always managed to escape punishment". However in 1937 he was sentenced to two concurrent 15-year prison terms on narcotics charges. Civello and his brothers Sam and Leon were caught with heroin valued at $300,000 at wholesale price. Civello served six years in Fort Leavenworth before being released in 1944. He received an early parole on the recommendation of Dallas Sheriff Bill Decker.

== Criminal career ==
In 1956 he succeeded Joe Piranio as the head of the Dallas mafia. Civello, now the head of Marcello's operation in Dallas, represented him at the infamous Apalachin Meeting in 1957. This was an unprecedented mafia summit attended by an estimated 100 mafiosi. He travelled there accompanied by his underboss Joseph Campisi. New Orleans crime family boss Carlos Marcello was angry that the Genovese crime family had attempted to kill Frank Costello that year, so he sent Civello instead of personally attending. Russell Bufalino picked up Civello, Simone Scozzari, and Frank DeSimone at the Hotel New Yorker and took them to Casey Hotel in Scranton. The next morning he drove them to Apalachin for the meeting. In 1959 Civello was convicted of a "conspiracy" charge, he was sentenced to five years in prison. Sentencing judge Irving Kaufman described him as a "high-ranking criminal who cloaked himself with the facade of legitimate business". This was later overturned after an appeal by the lawyer Percy Foreman in 1960. Despite his attendance at the Apalachin meeting and his criminal convictions, a report filed in February 1962 by the FBI's Dallas field office stated: "There is no evidence of illegal activity by Joseph Civello." FBI information on the mafia in general was seriously deficient at this time. In 1957 an FBI field office described Civello as simply "a counselor to the Italian community at large".

In the late 1950s Federal Bureau of Narcotics (FBN) agent John T. Cusack testified before a US Senate committee that Civello was an individual of "major importance" in narcotics trafficking. In its 1963 hearings regarding the links between organized crime and narcotics trafficking, the United States Senate's Permanent Subcommittee on Investigations noted that Civello had criminal associates that included Rocco and Peter Pellegrino of New York City; Frank Torticelli, Biagio Angelica, Joe Ianni, and Joe Glaviano of Texas; and Nicholas Impastato, Joseph Filadro and Joseph DeLuca of Kansas City. It described him as controlling all of the rackets in Dallas and environs. Frank Coppola transported narcotics to Civello in Dallas. This was done by a trucking company owned by John Ormento of the Lucchese crime family. He was also a close friend of James Lanza of the Lanza crime family in San Francisco. In 1967 Civello was approached to arrange a meeting between Al Marshall and Nick Civella of the Kansas City crime family. Marshall sought Civella's support in purchasing the Riviera hotel and casino with a Teamsters fund loan.

During hearings before the House Select Committee on Crime, Representative Sam Steiger asked Carlos Marcello if he recalled meeting Civello. Marcello replied only, "I've heard of him."

Civello was close to Jack Ruby, the killer of Lee Harvey Oswald. He was interviewed by the FBI on 14 January 1964. In its investigation of the assassination of John F. Kennedy, the House Select Committee on Assassinations said that it recognized Ruby's murder of Oswald as a primary reason to suspect organized crime as possibly having involvement in the assassination. In its investigation of Ruby to determine if he was involved in criminal activities and if that involvement was related to the killing of Oswald, the HSCA noted that Ruby was a "personal acquaintance" of Civello and that Civello was an associate of Marcello. The Committee reported that "Oswald and Ruby showed a variety of relationships that may have matured into an assassination conspiracy" but that it "was unable firmly to identify the other gunman or the nature and extent" of a conspiracy involving organized crime.

== Final days ==
Civello's racketeering continued, as did his expansion into legitimate businesses. Judge Irving R. Kaufman called Civello a "high ranking criminal who cloaked himself with the facade of legitimate business."

Civello died on January 17, 1970, in Dallas of natural causes. His obituary indicated no children, but listed his wife Mary, a brother and five sisters as survivors. Joseph Campisi was appointed as his replacement in Marcello's outfit. He was buried at Calvary Hill Cemetery in Dallas.
