= Hooky Rothman =

American mobster (1910–1948)

Harold Rothman
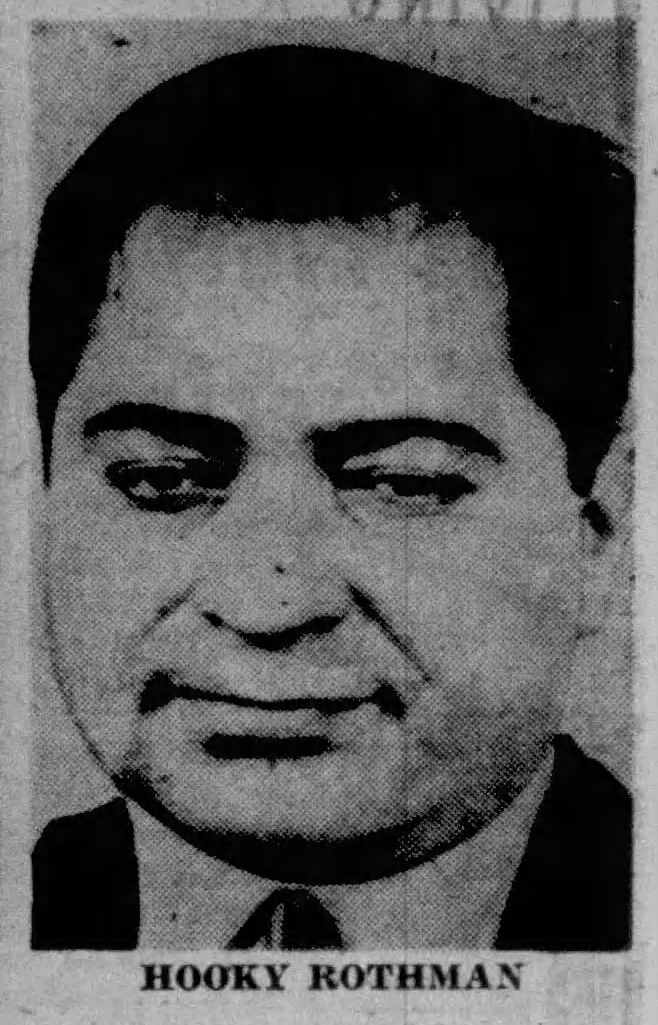
- Born: Harold Rothman; 1910; New York, New York, U.S.
- Died: August 18, 1948 (aged 37–38); Los Angeles, California, U.S.
- Other names: Harry, Hooky
- Known for: Hitman; enforcer; bodyguard

Harold "Hooky" Rothman (1910 – August 18, 1948), also known as Harry Rothman, was a Jewish mobster and mob enforcer who was the right-hand man of Los Angeles kingpin Mickey Cohen during "The Battle of Sunset Strip" for the control of illegal activities in Las Vegas and Los Angeles.

== Early life ==
Harold Rothman was born to Jewish parents in New York, New York. He had eight brothers and two sisters.

Rothman had a lengthy criminal career and served a term of imprisonment in 1938 in New York State.

== World War II ==
Rothman served in World War II in the US Army as a private from 1942 to 1945, and received an Honorable Discharge.

== The Battle of Sunset Strip ==
After World War II, Rothman went to Los Angeles, California in mid-late 1945. In 1946, on orders of former New York mob boss and fellow hitman Benjamin Siegel and Mickey Cohen, Rothman murdered rival bookies Benny "the Meatball" Gamson and George Levinson in their apartment.

Cohen ordered their deaths because Levinson and Gamson were moving in on his business, including extortion, prostitution, narcotics, and Siegel and Cohen's gambling rackets. Jimmy Fratianno had considered Harold "Hooky" Rothman to be Cohen's toughest and smartest man.

On June 20, 1947, Siegel was murdered by his East Coast bosses. After the hit, Los Angeles crime family boss Jack Dragna (Cohen's rival) attempted a hostile takeover of Siegel's gambling rackets. Dragna ran into a roadblock in the form of Cohen, who wasn't about to let Dragna take it all over without a fight, and the war was on.

== Death ==
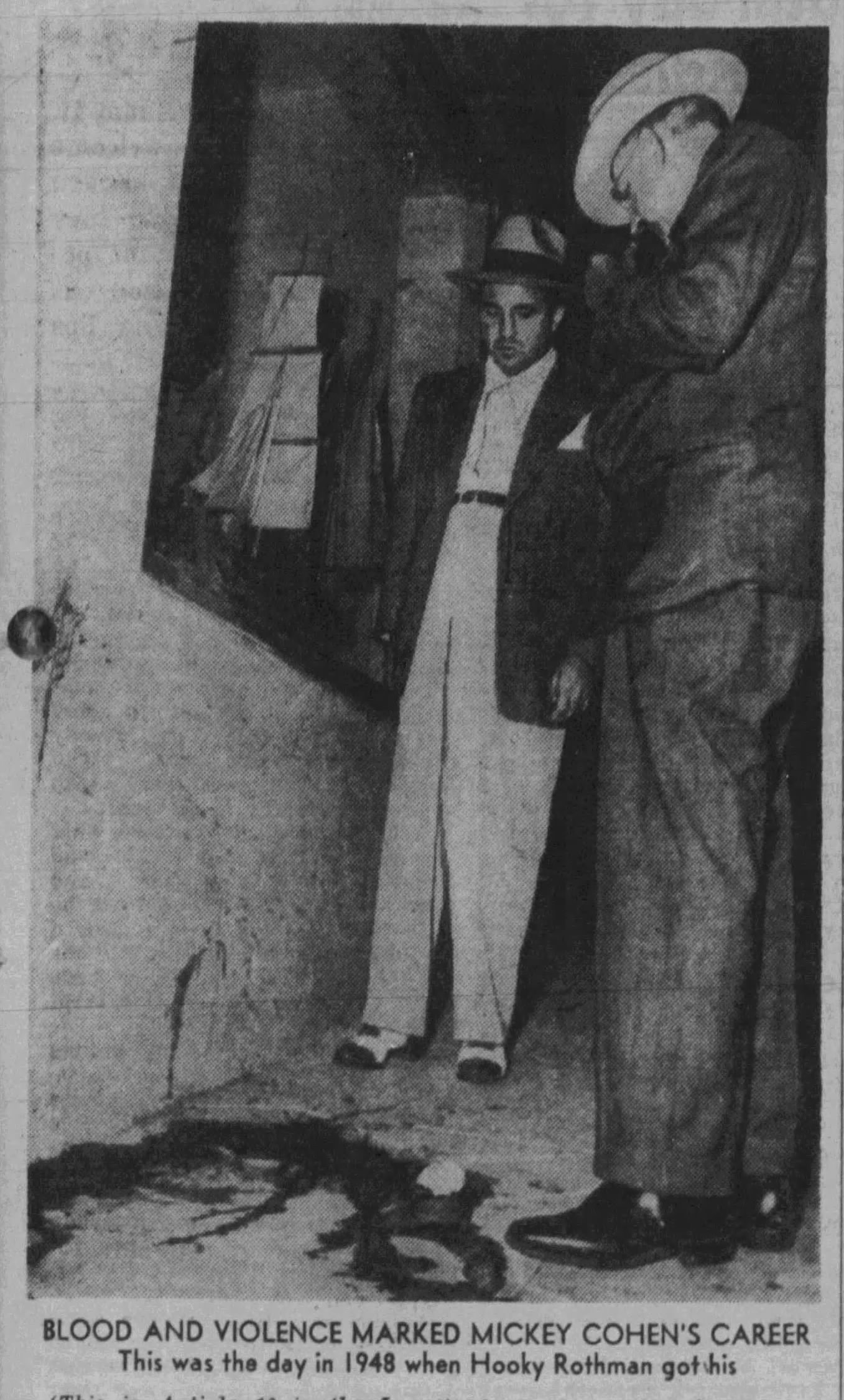
"This was the day in 1948 when Hooky Rothman got his" (Daily News, March 27, 1952)

On August 18, 1948, Jimmy Fratianno used his wife and daughter to set up Cohen at his Sunset Boulevard men's haberdashery store. As Fratianno and his family left the store, he hand signaled the other Dragna gang members, and they rushed into Cohen's store. At that point, Cohen was washing his hands in the bathroom, from a phobia Cohen had of germs, after shaking Fratianno's hands. Frank Bompensiero forced Rothman back into the clothing store using a sawed-off shotgun. As two other hitmen ran past him, Rothman swung his hand at Bompensiero's shotgun, causing it to go off. The shot hit Rothman in the face, killing him instantly.

== In media ==
Rothman is the basis for a hitman and close friend of Siegel in the TNT miniseries Mob City.

== See also ==
- Cohen crime family – the crime family that Rothman belonged to
- Battle of Sunset Strip – the war in which he died
