= Frank Bompensiero =

American mobster (1905–1977)

- Bompensiero in an FBI photo
- Born: October 29, 1905; Milwaukee, Wisconsin, U.S.
- Died: February 10, 1977 (aged 71); San Diego, California, U.S.
- Other name: "Bomp"
- Occupation: Mobster
- Allegiance: Los Angeles crime family
- Convictions: Violation of the Volstead Act (1932); Bribery, conspiracy (1955)
- Penalty: 1 year's imprisonment 3–42 years' imprisonment

Frank "Bomp" Bompensiero (October 29, 1905 – February 10, 1977) was an American mobster who was a longtime caporegime in the Los Angeles crime family. In 1956, with the death of boss Jack Dragna, Bompensiero was demoted to the rank of soldier by the new boss, Frank DeSimone. He was the older brother of associate Salvatore "Sam" Bompensiero. Bompensiero made a name for himself for the many killings he committed on the orders of his superiors. Jimmy Fratianno, a close associate, once said that Bompensiero "had buried more bones than could be found in the brontosaurus room of the Museum of Natural History."

== Early life and family ==
Bompensiero's family was from Porticello, Sicily. His family immigrated to the United States in 1904 along with the Balistrieri family (Frank Balistrieri would eventually lead the Milwaukee crime family). After the family settled in Milwaukee, Bompensiero was born on October 29, 1905. As a child, he attended Andrew Jackson Elementary School in Milwaukee but dropped out after the third grade. While in Milwaukee, he worked at an automobile parts manufacturer. He moved to San Diego as a young man in the mid-1920s. It was during his time in San Diego that Bompensiero got his start in organized crime by bootlegging alcohol coming over the border from Tijuana. He eventually married Thelma Jan San-Felippe and had one child, a daughter named Mary Ann. He also had a grandson named Frank. His first home in San Diego was at 5878 Estelle Street in El Cerrito before he moved to Pacific Beach later on. During World War II, Bompensiero served in the United States Army from 1942 to 1943.

== Western rackets ==
Early in Bompensiero's crime career in San Diego in the 1920s, he met Jack Dragna in Los Angeles, who was the boss of the Los Angeles crime family. After seeing how fearless Bompensiero was, Dragna soon became his mentor. Bompensiero was then involved in bootlegging operations in San Diego during Prohibition. He was later convicted of a liquor violation in San Diego. His other early arrests were for possession of firearms, illegal gambling, kidnapping, and murder. Charges were dropped in most cases. He eventually served a year in McNeil Island Corrections Center for the liquor conviction and was released in 1933.

Impressed with the young criminal, Dragna eventually made him a caporegime, placing him in charge of all of the L.A. family's interests in San Diego. Wanted for questioning in the 1937 Redondo Beach murder of mobster Les Brunemann, Frank Bompensiero left California, but was able to return in 1941 after an innocent man was convicted of Brunemann's murder. During the 1940s and 1950s, Bompensiero owned a San Diego music store with Gaspare Matranga and a horseracing wire service company. He also owned the Gold Rail cafe in downtown at the U.S. Grant Hotel, a successful business that he owned with Tom Dragna's son Frank and nephew Louis. Bompensiero and his crew also co-owned and operated several bars in the downtown San Diego area where they often conducted loan sharking operations.

During this time, Bompensiero was tabbed by Dragna as an extortion shakedown artist and hitman in San Diego and Los Angeles. He was involved in one of the attempts on Mickey Cohen's life at Cohen's business office on the Sunset Strip, and killed Cohen torpedo Neddie Herbert. Bomp's San Diego crew included Tony Mirabile, Paul Mirabile, Gaspare Matranga, Joe Adamo, Biaggio Bonventre, and Joseph Li Mandri. His close associates in the Los Angeles mob included Jimmy "The Weasel" Fratianno and Leo "Lips" Moceri, both of whom he teamed up with on multiple occasions to commit mob-sanctioned murders.

In 1955, Bompensiero was convicted of bribery and conspiracy in an illegal liquor license transaction and was sentenced to 3–42 years in prison. He began his sentence at Chino. While in prison, his wife Thelma died of a stroke. Bompensiero was escorted from prison by the police so he could attend her funeral. He was later transferred to San Quentin State Prison in Northern California, the same prison where Jimmy Fratianno was serving a prison sentence for extortion.

While Bompensiero was in prison, mob boss Jack Dragna died of a heart attack, and attorney and mobster Frank DeSimone took over the Los Angeles family. DeSimone immediately demoted Bompensiero to soldier from capo, and appointed Tony Mirabile as the boss of San Diego. Outraged, Bompensiero later attempted to transfer to the Chicago Outfit, but was unsuccessful. Johnny Roselli later told Fratianno that he didn't want both Fratianno and Bompensiero to transfer to Chicago, because it would seem to Chicago like "everyone" who was a good worker wanted to leave the L.A. family. While on parole, Bompensiero worked several jobs for friends and associates to satisfy his parole work requirements.

Soon Bompensiero had numerous new dealings in Las Vegas with Cleveland mobster and casino owner Moe Dalitz and Chicago Outfit mobster Anthony "Tony the Ant" Spilotro. He also counted retired Bonanno crime family boss Joseph Bonanno in Arizona, and John Roselli as allies; later over a hit dispute, he had a falling out with Roselli. In 1967, Bompensiero was arrested with Fratianno over a Fratianno Trucking Company dirt-hauling union scheme where Jimmy's company had violated PUC regulations. This legal violation involved Jimmy and Jewel Fratianno's large trucking company, Fratianno Trucking. Under intense pressure, with he and Fratianno in the El Centro jail, unable to make a high bail, Bompensiero agreed to become a confidential informant for the Federal Bureau of Investigation (FBI), and the charges against him were eventually dropped.

In the early 1970s, Bompensiero and Tony Spilotro started a large loansharking operation in Las Vegas. In November 1975, acting as driver, Bompensiero helped Spilotro murder Tamara Rand, a multimillionaire real estate broker and investor from San Diego. At that time, Rand was suing Allen Glick, the mob front man in Las Vegas, to pay back a $2 million loan that she had made to him. Spilotro carefully snuck into Rand's house as she was ready to have tea, and fatally shot her with a .22 caliber handgun, equipped with a silencer, while Bompensiero drove the murder getaway car.

== FBI sting and murder ==
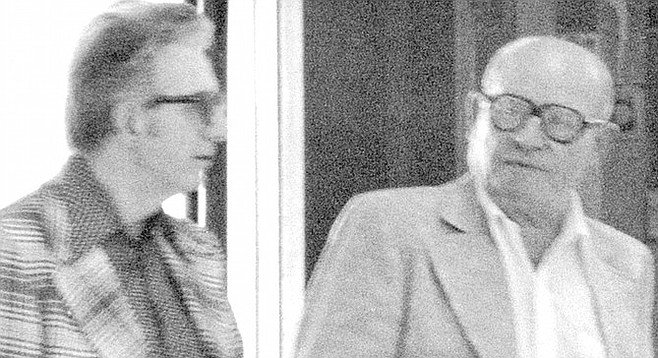
FBI surveillance photo of Jimmy Fratianno (left) and Frank Bompensiero (right)

Since the death of Los Angeles boss Jack Dragna, Bompensiero had been highly critical of the new family leadership. Boss Dominic Brooklier, who never trusted Bompensiero, finally lost patience and decided to have him killed. Bompensiero was an extremely cautious gangster and proved difficult to kill. To make Bompensiero less cautious, Brooklier promoted him from soldier to capo. Six months later, the Los Angeles family was still trying to get to Bompensiero.

In 1977, the FBI set up a pornography sting business called "Forex" and used Bompensiero to convince the Los Angeles family to make an attempt to extort money from Forex. The sting operation worked, and Michael "Mike Rizzi" Rizzitello was given a subpoena by the FBI agents who ran Forex. After the Forex indictments in February 1977, Fratianno questioned Bompensiero about how he learned about Forex. Unsatisfied with Bompensiero's cagey responses, Fratianno became convinced that Bompensiero was an informant.

A week later, on February 10, 1977, Frank Bompensiero was shot to death at close range with a silenced .22 caliber handgun while walking home after using a pay phone outside an Arco Station in the Pacific Beach neighborhood of San Diego. In 1978, Fratianno told law enforcement that mob associate Thomas Ricciardi had killed Bompensiero in return for membership in the Los Angeles family. When Ricciardi shot Bompensiero, Jack LoCicero was waiting in the getaway car. The government later charged Ricciardi with Bompensiero's murder, but he died of heart disease before the trial could start. The rest of the defendants were acquitted of murder at the trial, but were convicted of racketeering.

== Murders ==
Confirmed murders that Bompensiero committed, or committed with others, are:

- Phil Galuzo - February 28, 1939
- Harold "Hooky" Rothman - August 18, 1948
- Frank Borgia - 1951
- Louis "Russian Louie" Strauss - April 1953
- "Red" Sagunda - date unknown

== See also ==
- List of unsolved murders (1900–1979)

== Citations ==
Business positions
Preceded by Tommy Palermo	Los Angeles crime family Consigliere; 1975-1977	Succeeded by Jack LoCicero
