= Anthony Brancato =

American criminal

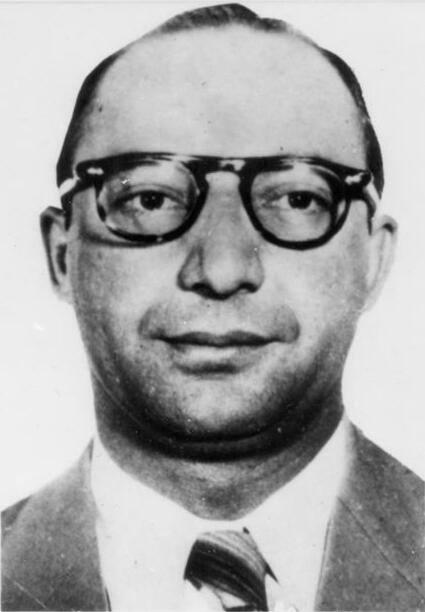

FBI Ten Most Wanted Fugitive
- Charges: Robbery

Description
- Born: July 18, 1914; Kansas City, Missouri, United States
- Died: August 6, 1951 (aged 37); Los Angeles, California, United States

Status
- Added: June 27, 1951
- Caught: June 29, 1951
- Number: 21
- Captured

Anthony Brancato (July 18, 1914 – August 6, 1951) was an American criminal who served as a freelance gunman to various Mafia and syndicate organizations.

== Early career ==
Born in Kansas City in 1914, Brancato became involved in armed robbery and drug dealing. He later moved to Southern California in 1946.

Arriving in Los Angeles during the early stages of the mob feud between Los Angeles crime family boss Jack Dragna and Mickey Cohen, Brancato was immediately able to find freelance mob work. He soon compiled a criminal record including illegal gambling, narcotics, and bootlegging.

Brancato was briefly considered by police a suspect in a few Hollywood gangland slayings, including that of New York and Los Angeles mobster Bugsy Siegel and Mickey Cohen gunman Hooky Rothman. Brancato was also a suspect in the July 1949 assassination attempt on Cohen himself. Fresno, California police questioned Brancato about the drug-related death of Abe Davidson. He was a relative of Cleveland crime syndicate underboss Frank Brancato who served under Jack Lacovelli in 1972 and later underboss to John Scalish until his death in 1973.

== Brancato & Trombino: The "Two Tonys" ==
Brancato frequently teamed up with fellow Kansas City criminal Anthony Trombino. The two men were arrested 46 times in total, on charges ranging from robbery and rape, to assault.

On May 28, 1951, the "Two Tonys", as they were called, robbed the sports betting operation at the syndicate-controlled Flamingo Hotel and Resort in Las Vegas, Nevada, escaping with $3,500 in cash. Neglecting to wear a mask during the robbery, Brancato was identified by sportsbook manager Hy Goldbaum, who had been held up by Brancato in Beverly Hills two years earlier. He was placed on the FBI's Ten Most Wanted list on June 27, 1951. Two days later, with his lawyer present, Brancato surrendered to federal agents in San Francisco. After posting a $10,000 bail, Brancato was rearrested before leaving the building on a Nevada warrant charging him as a fugitive from justice. However, he was now out of money and was unable to post bail.

Brancato's case soon became a minor cause célèbre among students of constitutional law, accusing state and federal authorities of violating Brancato's civil rights. Released without bond on a writ of habeas corpus, Brancato traveled south to Los Angeles to rendezvous with Trombino.

== Final days ==
Having identified the duo as the Flamingo Hotel Casino Las Vegas race and sportsbook armed robbers, the mob was soon looking for Brancato and Trombino. L.A. mob boss Jack Dragna had ordered their deaths, and he personally gave Jimmy Fratianno the assigned duty of setting up the mob-sanctioned hit. In desperate need of cash for their various legal bills, the Two Tonys made their personal situation worse by cheating gambler Sam Lazes out of $3,000, after posing as collectors for a local syndicate bookmaker. Mobster Jimmy ("The Weasel") Fratianno contacted Brancato and Trombino through Sam Lazes and his actor friend, Sam London. Fratianno asked to meet the Two Tonys in mid afternoon at London's Hollywood apartment on August 6, to talk about the proposed robbery of a high stakes cash poker game that night in Hollywood.

However, the real purpose of the late afternoon meeting at London's apartment was to set up both Tony Brancato and Tony Trombino. At the meeting, the duo agreed to meet Fratianno later on Ogden Street, outside London's apartment, at 7:30 p.m., to hold up the huge cash poker game. Fratianno said he would bring another mob associate to help with the poker game robbery, and Jimmy helpfully added he would bring the "tools" (the handguns) needed for the armed robbery.

On August 6, 1951, Brancato and Trombino were shot to death at about 7:30 p.m., while sitting in the front seat of their Oldsmobile on Ogden Street, near Hollywood Boulevard. The mobsters involved in the murder: Fratianno, Nick Licata, Charles "Charley Bats" Battaglia, Angelo Polizzi, and Leo "Lips" Moceri, plus Fratianno's brother Warren (who had no part in the murder), were arrested the next day for the crime. Licata had set up a well planned phony alibi for the mobsters at his restaurant, The Five O'Clock Club, in Burbank, California. The Los Angeles mobsters claimed to police they were all attending a friendly "Fish Fry" at the Five O'Clock Club. No suspect was ever charged with the Two Tonys murders, and they remained unsolved. Although the LAPD still strongly suspected the L.A. mob of the murders, The Two Tonys murder case would remain unsolved until Jimmy Fratianno entered the federal Witness Protection Program over 25 years later, and admitted to murdering the duo with Charley Battaglia.

== In popular culture ==
=== Film ===
- In the 1997 Curtis Hanson film L.A. Confidential, Tony Brancato and Anthony Trombino are shot to death in a 1948 Oldsmobile coupé parked off Sunset Boulevard. The assailants are reported by Hush-Hush magazine to be working for unknown forces taking over the Mickey Cohen rackets after he was sent to prison for income tax evasion (great Hush-Hush headline "In The Joint With Micky C").

=== Literature ===
- In James Ellroy's White Jazz, the novel's protagonist, David Klein, kills Tony Brancato and Anthony Trombino. There is also a reference to the Two Tonys' murder in Ellroy's novel "American Tabloid". When the character Lenny Sands is asked "Who clipped Tony Trombino and Tony Brancato"?, Sands answers "Jimmy Frattiano or some cop named Dave Klein."

=== Television ===
- The title of episode 53 of The Sopranos, "Two Tonys" (2004), refers in part to Tony Brancato and Anthony Trombino.
