= Sam Farkas =

Alleged American underworld figure (1917–2006)

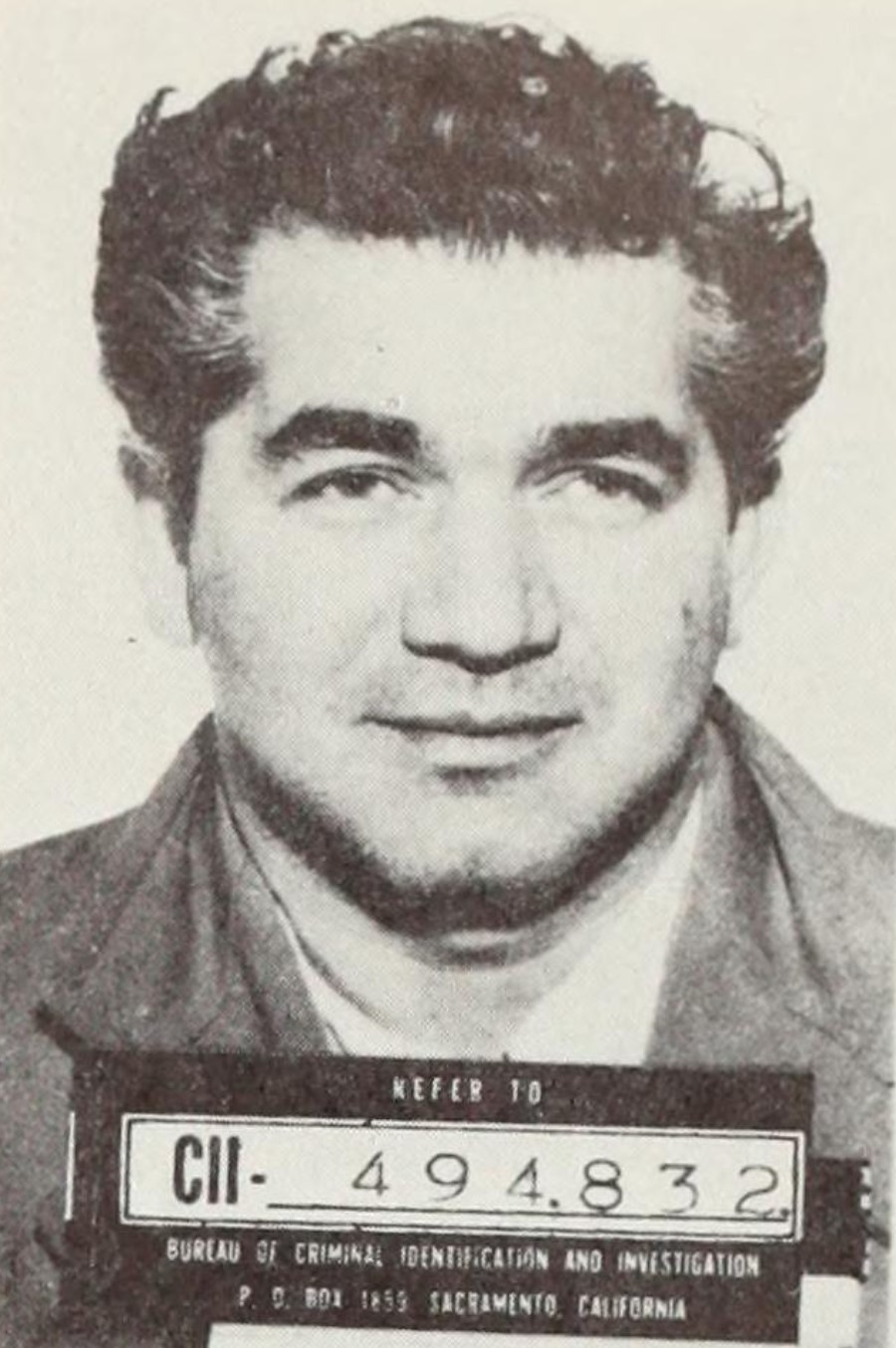
- Mugshot of Farkas taken c. 1959
- Born: May 15, 1917; New York City, New York, U.S.
- Died: August 13, 2006 (aged 89); Los Angeles County, California, U.S.
- Criminal charges: Extortion; Loan sharking

Sam Farkas (May 15, 1917 – August 13, 2006) was an American bookmaker and bodyguard, best known for his criminal affiliation with Los Angeles mob boss Mickey Cohen. A mobster of 20th-century California, Farkas was indicted by a U.S. federal government organized-crime task force on multiple criminal charges in 1974.

== Biography ==
Farkas was described as Mickey Cohen's bodyguard in 1950 when he, Cohen, and one Dominic "Highpockets" Faranacci attended the funeral of Cohen's murdered lawyer, Sam Rummel. In 1951, Farkas was one of the "gangland figures" connected to the brothel of Hollywood madam Barrie Benson. A man named Joe DiStefano, reportedly visiting from New York, tried to shoot Farkas in 1952.

Sam Farkas married Mickey Cohen's ex-wife, La Vonne Cohen, in 1959. At some point in the 1960s, Farkas and his wife lived in the Baldwin Hills neighborhood, and his next-door neighbor later recalled that "he always wore a sport coat to hide the gun I occasionally glimpsed in the holster just under his left arm". The couple moved out of the building after it was machine-gunned by men in black cars.

In 1974, Farkas was indicted by the U.S. government on multiple charges including extortion and loans sharking. Farkas was described by the Los Angeles Police Department as a "major bookmaker". Farkas died in Los Angeles County, California, in 2006.
