= Jimmy Fratianno =

Italian-American mobster (1913–1993)

- Mugshot of Fratianno
- Born: Aladena Fratianno; November 14, 1913; Naples, Campania, Italy
- Died: June 29, 1993 (aged 79); Oklahoma City, Oklahoma, U.S.
- Other name: "Jimmy the Weasel"
- Citizenship: American
- Occupation: Crime boss
- Spouse: Jean Fratianno (m. 1975)
- Allegiance: Los Angeles crime family
- Convictions: Robbery (1937); Attempted extortion (1954); Murder (1977)
- Penalty: Seven years' imprisonment (1937); Six years and three months' imprisonment (1954); Five years' imprisonment (1977)

Aladena James Fratianno (born Aladena Fratianno; November 14, 1913 – June 29, 1993), also known as "Jimmy the Weasel", was an Italian-born American mobster who was acting boss of the Los Angeles crime family. After his arrest in 1977, Fratianno became an informant and entered the Witness Protection Program in 1980. He admitted to having killed five people. Later in life, he became a writer.

== Early life ==
Fratianno was born in Naples, Italy, in 1913, later immigrating with his family to the United States, settling near Cleveland, Ohio. He was first arrested at the age of 19, on suspicion of rape, but was not charged. Two years later, he was acquitted of robbery charges, but in 1937, was convicted of robbery and spent more than seven years in an Ohio state prison. Fratianno earned his nickname "Weasel" as a boy when running from the police in the Little Italy section of Cleveland. A chase witness shouted "Look at that weasel run!" and the police quickly attached the nickname to his criminal record, falsely believing it was his alias. He was paroled in 1945, and moved to Los Angeles, California, where he associated with underworld figure Mickey Cohen.

In 1951, he was arrested but later released in connection with the gangland-style killing of two mobsters believed to have plotted to kill Cohen. In 1954, Fratianno was convicted of attempted extortion; he served 6 years and 3 months, mostly at San Quentin State Prison. In 1968, he pleaded guilty to charges stemming from phony pay agreements with drivers at a trucking company he owned, and in 1971 he entered another guilty plea, this time for extortion. Fratianno married Jean, who he had met in an airport in 1966, in 1975.

== International connections ==
Fratianno was known to have global connections. One such connection was with Australian organized crime figures. In 1976, Australian criminal Murray Riley met with Fratianno in San Francisco, allegedly, to organize drug shipments. The same year, Sydney businessman Bela Csidei also met with Fratianno in San Francisco. The FBI took photographs of this meeting.

Fratianno also associated with Australian/Hungarian transport magnate and managing director of Thomas Nationwide Transport, Peter Abeles. Through Fratianno's connections with Teamsters and Longshoremen's unions, particularly with Rudy Tham, a San Francisco Teamsters leader, Abeles was able to use his company to smuggle drugs in and out of the U.S., as well as reduce industrial tensions on the waterfront.

== Acting Boss ==
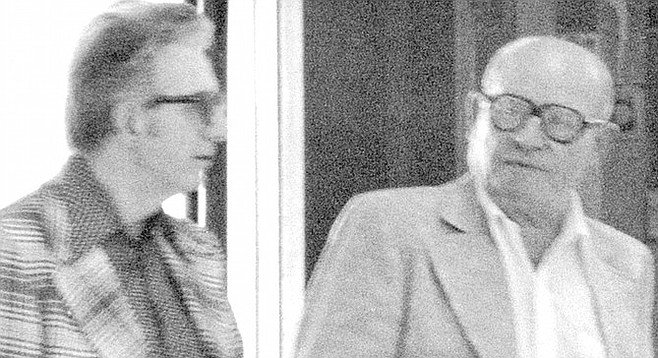
Fratianno (left) with Frank Bompensiero.

In 1975, the boss of the Los Angeles family, Dominic Brooklier, was sent to prison, and Louis Tom Dragna was made acting boss. He accepted the position on the condition that he run the family together with Fratianno. Fratianno accepted the proposal with the understanding that he would carry the majority of the responsibility.

Soon after, Fratianno was approached by Dragna in regards to having Frank Bompensiero murdered. Bompensiero was one of the few made men that Fratianno trusted, as they were old friends, and he was infuriated that the Los Angeles family would give him such a 'contract'. At this point Fratianno felt that he was tricked into becoming co acting boss with Louie Dragna, a leadership position which required him to be transferred from the Chicago Outfit back to the Los Angeles family. Because of his close relationship with Frank Bompensiero, Dominic Brooklier assumed that Fratianno could easily lay a trap, and murder Bompensiero. Fratianno stalled the murder contract for months, until the contract was given to other L.A. mob associates.

Dominic Brooklier was released from prison in October 1976, after serving 16 months. After a transition period he called Fratianno to a meeting sometime before February 11, 1977, and announced to Jimmy and other L.A. mob members that he (Brooklier) was ready to resume his position as L.A. Mob Boss. Jimmy Fratianno was once again an L.A. mob soldier.

== Last stages of Mafia career ==
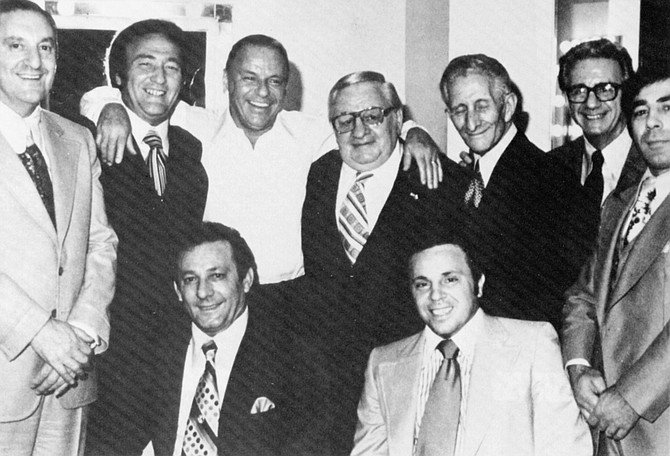
Fratianno (second from the right) and other mobsters with Frank Sinatra at the Westchester Premier Theater on April 11, 1976.

Along with members and associates of the Gambino, Colombo and Genovese crime families of New York, Fratianno was involved in the skimming of revenue from the Westchester Premier Theater in Tarrytown, New York. The fraud scheme ultimately forced the theater into bankruptcy. On April 11, 1976, Fratianno was photographed backstage at the Westchester Premier Theater along with Frank Sinatra and several mobsters, including Carlo Gambino, Paul Castellano and Gregory DePalma, following a performance by Sinatra.

Sometime between February 11 and May 16, 1977, Brooklier summoned Fratianno to a sit down and accused him of running a separate 'crew' in the Los Angeles territory and saying, "Jimmy, you've got a bad mouth, like [Bompensiero]..." In 1977 Brooklier started claiming that Fratianno was never Acting Boss and that Fratianno was misrepresenting himself. Jimmy Fratianno began to suspect that Brooklier was trying to poison his mob reputation, and lay the groundwork to have him killed. Then at the wake for Tony Delsanter, Fratianno learned that Cleveland crime family boss James Licavoli had a mole in the FBI, a female clerk, that was feeding the family documents. Licavoli also told Fratianno that the Family had the code numbers for two informants and that the FBI clerk was working on getting their names.

== Government witness and later life ==
On October 6, 1977, Irish mob boss Danny Greene, a secret FBI informant and mortal enemy of the Cleveland crime family, was killed by a car bomb outside his dentist's office in suburban Lyndhurst, Ohio. Soon after, Ray Ferritto, a soldier in the Cleveland and Los Angeles crime families, was arrested for the murder based on a detailed sketch by an eyewitness. Evidence found during a police search of his house further proved Ferritto's role in the murder.

Upon hearing that Ferritto had been arrested, Cleveland Mafia boss James Licavoli immediately ordered the former's assassination. When Ferritto learned of this, he became a cooperating witness and testified against his co-defendants in the 1978 trial. The Cuyahoga County District Attorney indicted Licavoli, Angelo Lonardo, Ferritto, Ronald Carabbia and 15 other members of the Cleveland crime family for conspiring towards Danny Greene's murder.

Ferritto also implicated Fratianno in the planning of Greene's murder, and Fratianno was indicted for charges related to the bombing. Similarly fearing for his safety, Fratianno also agreed to become a government witness against the Mafia. In return for his testimony, he pleaded guilty to multiple murder charges and received a five-year prison sentence, of which he served 21 months.

In 1980, after his testimony resulted in the racketeering convictions of five reputedly high level Mafia figures, Fratianno entered the federal Witness Protection Program. Fratianno claimed that the Mafia had a $100,000 contract on his life. In 1987, after he published two biographies, The Last Mafioso (1980) with author Ovid Demaris and Vengeance is Mine (1987) with author Michael J. Zuckerman, Fratianno was expelled from Witness Protection after the Justice Department noted that it had spent almost $1 million on the Fratiannos in 10 years.

On June 29, 1993, Fratianno died of natural causes at his home in an undisclosed U.S. city, believed to be Oklahoma City. His wife Jean said that he had suffered from Alzheimer's disease, as well as a series of strokes. Fratianno is portrayed by Joseph Riccobene in Martin Scorsese's crime film The Irishman (2019).

== Murders ==
Fratianno had admitted to committing five murders:

- Frank Niccoli - Niccoli was a bodyguard and collector for mob boss Mickey Cohen. Following Jack Dragna's orders, Fratianno tried to convince Niccoli to leave Cohen and join Dragna's mob, but Niccoli refused. In a few minutes, Fratianno and Joseph Dippolito strangled Niccoli to death. (1949)
- Frank Borgia - Borgia was a Los Angeles winemaker/former bootlegger and was a member of the Los Angeles crime family, according to Fratianno. Borgia was resisting an extortion attempt from Gaspare Matranga and Dragna. Bompensiero and Fratianno had a friend of Borgia's bring him to a house. Then Fratianno and Bompensiero strangled Borgia with a rope and other mobsters buried him. (1951)
- Anthony Brancato - Brancato and his criminal associate Tony Trombino were two young mobsters who were performing robberies in Los Angeles and Las Vegas without the sanction of the Los Angeles family. Jack Dragna told Jimmy Fratianno they needed to be "clipped", and asked Jimmy to set "something up". Within a few days, Fratianno set up the two Tonys and killed them in their car. (August 6, 1951)
- Anthony Trombino - see Anthony Brancato. (August 6, 1951)
- Louis Strauss - Louis (Russian Louie) Strauss was a former casino owner in Lake Tahoe, and a mob-connected man who was trying to extort money from Las Vegas casino owner Benny Binion, a friend of Dragna's. Fratianno set Strauss up by befriending him in Las Vegas, and telling Louis he had $10,000 in cash in Los Angeles he would loan him. After driving to Los Angeles with Fratianno, Strauss then walked into a house, where Bompensiero and Fratianno surprised him with a rope and strangled him to death. (1953)
