= Jack Dragna =

American mobster (1891–1956)

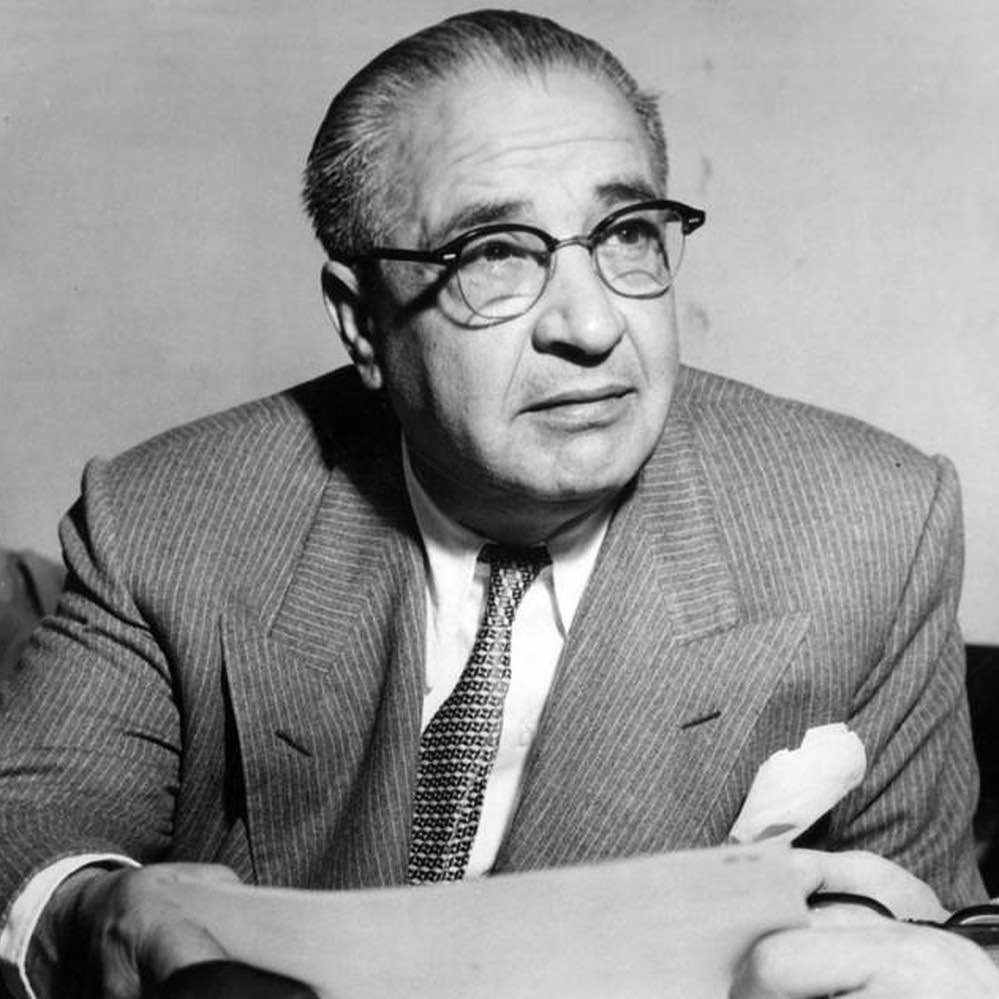
- Dragna in 1953
- Born: Ignazio Dragna; April 18, 1891; Corleone, Sicily, Italy
- Died: February 23, 1956 (aged 64); Los Angeles, California, U.S.
- Other names: Charles Dragna, Antonio Rizzotto
- Occupation: Crime boss
- Spouse: Francesca Dragna (m. 1922)
- Children: 2
- Relatives: Tom Dragna (brother); Louis Tom Dragna (nephew)
- Allegiance: Los Angeles crime family

Jack Ignatius Dragna (born Ignazio Dragna, Italian pronunciation: [iɲˈɲattsjo ˈdraɲɲa]; April 18, 1891 – February 23, 1956) was a Sicilian-American Mafia member, entrepreneur and Black Hander who was active in both Italy and the United States in the 20th century. He was active in bootlegging in California during the Prohibition Era in the United States. In 1931, he succeeded Joseph Ardizzone as the boss of the Los Angeles crime family after Ardizzone's mysterious disappearance and death. Both James Ragen and Earl Warren dubbed Dragna the "Capone of Los Angeles". Dragna remained the boss of the Los Angeles crime family from 1931 until his death in 1956.

== Biography ==
=== Early life ===
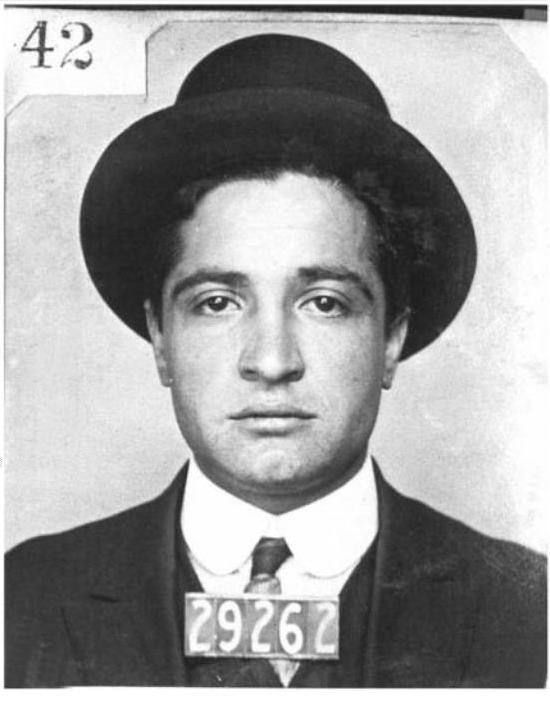
1915 mug shot of Dragna.

Dragna was born to Francesco Paolo Dragna and Anna Dragna in Corleone, Sicily, on April 18, 1891. On November 18, 1898, Dragna came to the United States on the S.S. Alsatia with his parents, older sister Giuseppa, and older brother Gaetano. They stayed in East Harlem, in Manhattan, with his mother's cousin Antonio Rizzotto's family, also from Corleone. It is unknown when Dragna's father arrived in the United States. Dragna stayed in New York for ten years before returning to Sicily. As a young man, he joined the Italian Army and later the Sicilian Mafia.

In 1914, Dragna returned to America. He appears to have had a relationship with Gaetano Reina, who eventually led his own crime family in Manhattan and the Bronx. That same year, Dragna petitioned for naturalization as Charles Dragna, and was a suspect in the murder of Jewish poultry dealer Barnet Baff. After the killing, Dragna fled to California. He was extradited to New York, but never went on trial. In 1915, Dragna was arrested for Black Hand extortion of a Long Beach man and served three years in prison. Dragna was arrested as Ignazio Rizzotto, leading to the assumption he was the brother of his criminal associate, Benigno Rizzotto, with whom he had lived in New York City.

During the Prohibition Era, Dragna and his brother Gaetano (now named Tom) ran extortion and illegal liquor distillation operations. In 1922, Dragna married his second cousin, Francesca Rizzotto. After his prison stint, he worked closely with Joseph Ardizzone, a prominent mobster in Los Angeles.

=== Mafia Don ===
In 1931, Dragna succeeded Joseph Ardizzone as boss of the Los Angeles crime family. It was rumored that Dragna was involved in Ardizzone's disappearance and presumed murder. The American Mafia wanted to make inroads in California, and supported Dragna, as opposed to the "Mustache Pete" Ardizzone. His brother Tom became his consigliere.

As boss, Dragna's chief source of income came from extorting local bookmakers for "protection" money, although he was also the main illegal gambling operator in the city. Other businesses including running gambling ships, a heroin smuggling operation, and collecting extortion money. His close supporters included Girolamo "Momo" Adamo and John Roselli. Roselli had been a member of the Chicago Outfit, but left for California and worked with Dragna in gambling. In the 1950s, Roselli left California and became the Mafia's main representative in Las Vegas. An old bootlegging associate of Dragna's, Anthony Cornero ran gambling ships off the coast of California. Tommy Lucchese, of the Lucchese crime family, was Dragna's main contact in New York. Dragna also controlled unions in the laundromat business and dress importing companies.

=== Siegel and Cohen ===
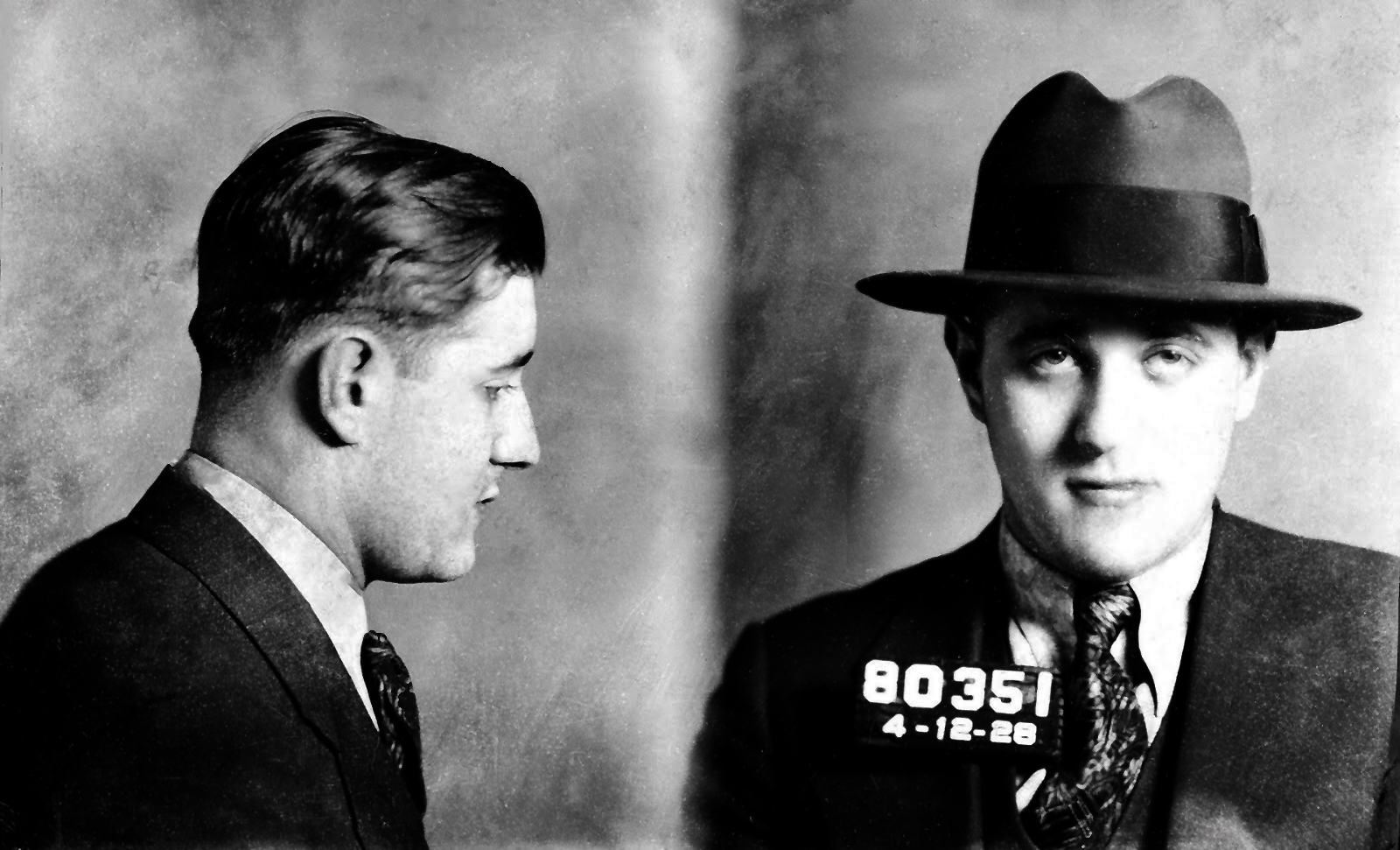
Benjamin "Bugsy" Siegel

As boss, Dragna often had to do business with representatives from the more powerful Cosa Nostra families in New York. When Benjamin "Bugsy" Siegel, an associate of the New York Luciano crime family, relocated to the West Coast during the late 1930s, he started his own rackets and formed an uneasy relationship with Dragna. Siegel brought in much more income for the Los Angeles family and generated a great deal of 'respect', which Dragna resented. Although many sources speak of a rivalry between them, Dragna and Siegel worked closely together, especially at organizing a racing wire service on the West Coast.

In June 1947, the East Coast crime families murdered Siegel in Beverly Hills due to his failure to properly manage the new Flamingo Hotel in Las Vegas. Mickey Cohen, who had been serving as Siegel's bodyguard, immediately took over Siegel's rackets and refused to accept Dragna's authority. Dragna ordered several murder attempts on Cohen, but he managed to survive them all. On February 14, 1950, the California Commission on Organized Crime singled out Dragna as the head of a crime syndicate that controlled crime in Southern California. Soon after, several Los Angeles family members were arrested for the bombing of Mickey Cohen's home. Dragna fled the state to avoid questioning. He later surrendered to authorities, and was questioned in the U.S. Senate Kefauver hearings, but denied all accusations against him. Cohen was also questioned in the hearings, and as a result was convicted of federal tax evasion and was forced to give up control of his rackets to the Los Angeles family.

=== Private life and death ===
In 1953, the federal government ordered Dragna to be deported to Sicily. Back in 1932, Dragna had violated immigration law by illegally entering the United States at the San Ysidro border crossing in San Diego after a three-day stay in Mexico. However, at the time of his death Dragna was still living in California, appealing against the deportation order.

Dragna was a very private boss who eschewed flashiness and attention. However, in the 1950s, the Los Angeles Police Department (LAPD) under Chief William H. Parker engaged in a campaign of harassment against organized crime figures. Dragna and his family were frequently arrested. When his wife Frances died in 1953, Dragna lost interest in running the Los Angeles family and instead focused on meeting new women. On one occasion, several members of the LAPD stationed themselves outside a trailer where Dragna and a girlfriend were having sex. Using listening devices, officers gained enough evidence to arrest Dragna for engaging in lewd acts.

On February 23, 1956, Dragna died of a heart attack in Los Angeles. His body was interred at Calvary Cemetery in East Los Angeles, California. Dragna was survived by two children. His son Frank Paul Dragna was a USC graduate and World War II veteran who lost an eye in the war and was nicknamed "One Eye" to distinguish him from his cousin who had the same name ("One Eye" also had a glass eye).

== In popular culture ==
- Dragna appears as a character in James Ellroy's fictional L.A. Quartet novels, specifically The Big Nowhere (1988) and White Jazz (1992).
- Though he does not make an actual appearance, he is mentioned several times in the 2011 video game L.A. Noire.
- A character by the same name appears in the sixth episode of the second series of the 1960s cult British spy-fi TV series The Avengers portrayed by Reed De Rouen.
- Dragna appears in the 2013 film Gangster Squad, where he is played by actor Jon Polito.
- In the 1991 film Bugsy, the highly fictionalized story of Bugsy Siegel, Dragna is played by Richard C. Sarafian.
- Paul Ben-Victor plays Dragna in the neo-noir 2013 TV series Mob City.

== Sources ==
American Mafia
Preceded by Joseph Ardizzone	Los Angeles crime family Boss; 1931-1956	Succeeded by Frank DeSimone
Preceded by ?	Los Angeles crime family Underboss; 192?-1931	Succeeded by Momo Adamo
