= Colacurcio =

Colacurcio is an Italian surname. Notable people with the surname include:

- Frank Colacurcio (1917–2010), Italian American businessman and boss of the Seattle crime family known for running strip clubs in Seattle
- Michael J. Colacurcio (born 1939), professor of English at UCLA specializing in American literature and literary history
- Colacurcio crime family a.k.a. Seattle crime family, a crime family based in Seattle, Washington
