= Castelbuono =

- Comune
- Comune di Castelbuono
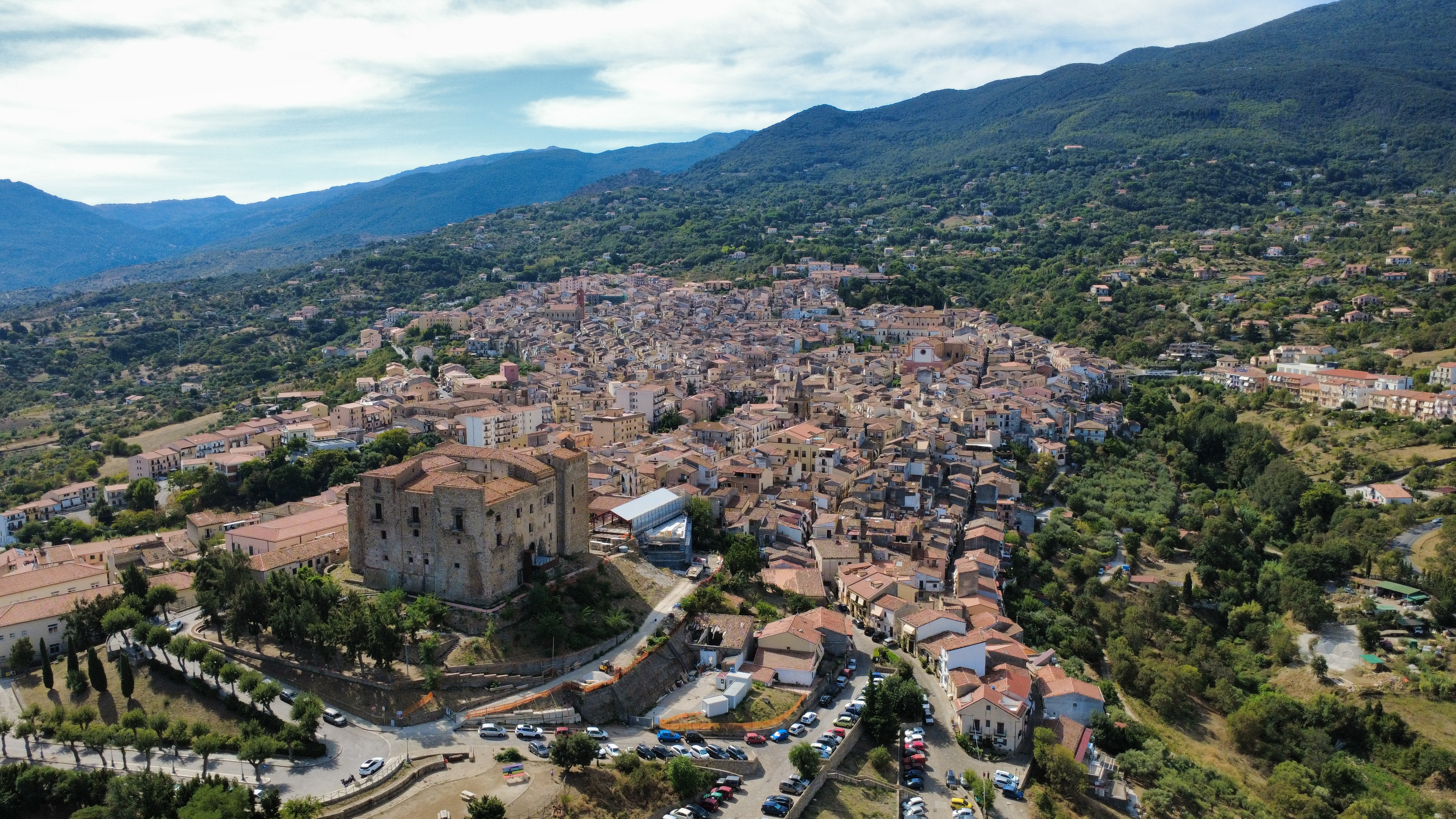

- Location within Italy Location within Sicily
- Coordinates: 37°56′N 14°06′E
- Country: Italy
- Region: Sicily
- Metropolitan city: Palermo (PA)

Government
  - Mayor: Mario Cicero

Area
  - Total: 60.51 km^{2} (23.36 sq mi)
- Elevation: 423 m (1,388 ft)

Population (28 February 2017)
  - Total: 8,795
  - Density: 145.3/km^{2} (376.4/sq mi)
- Demonym: Castelbuonesi
- Time zone: UTC+1 (CET)
  - Summer (DST): UTC+2 (CEST)
- Postal code: 90013
- Dialing code: 0921
- Patron saint: St. Anne
- Saint day: July 26
- Website: Official website

Castelbuono (Sicilian: Casteḍḍu-bonu or, locally, Castiḍḍubbuonu) is a town and comune in the Metropolitan City of Palermo, Sicily (southern Italy).

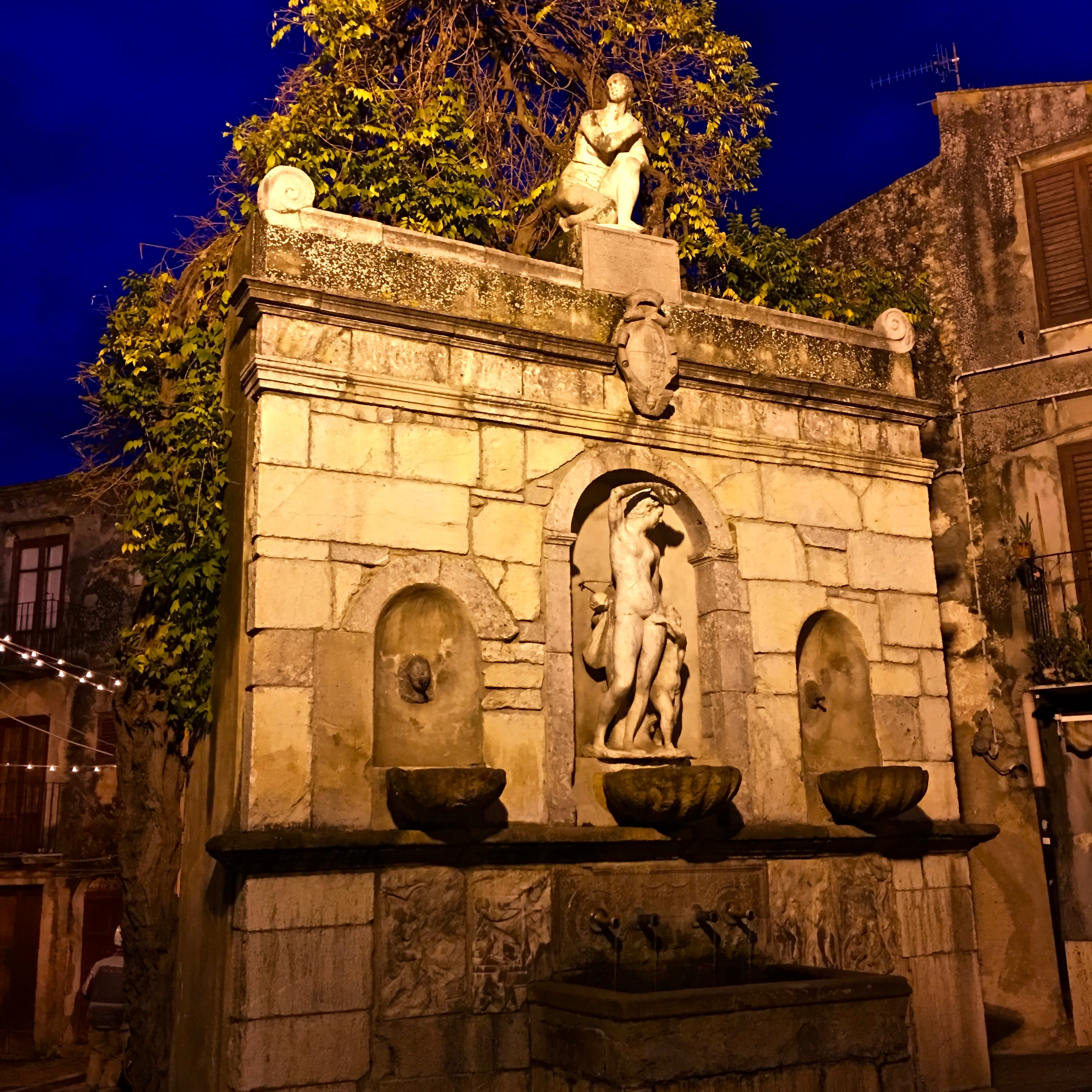
Fountain of Venere Ciprea.

It is known for the castle from which its name derives, around which the city developed in the 14th century.

== History ==
Construction of the Castle began in 1316, by order of Count Francesco I of Ventimiglia, over the ruins of the ancient Byzantine town of Ypsigro, high on the San Pietro hill. Hence its original name, Castello del buon aere ("Castle of good air"), from which the name Castelbuono is derived, literally meaning "good castle".

Numerous drastic alterations were made in the 17th century for reasons of accommodation, when a number of Ventimiglia families moved here from Palermo - the castle never served any really strategic purpose, owing to its geographic position down valley. The construction presents Arab-Norman and Swabian features: the cube shape recalls Arabic architecture; the square towers, although incorporated into those of the façade, reflect Norman architectural style, as also the battlements; and the round tower recalls aspects of Swabian architecture.

The city is home to one of Europe's oldest road running competitions: the Giro Podistico Internazionale Castelbuono is held annually, starting in 1912

== Demographics ==
Historical population

Year	Pop.	±%
1861	7,965	—
1871	8,222	+3.2%
1881	8,502	+3.4%
1901	10,761	+26.6%
1911	10,531	−2.1%
1921	10,512	−0.2%
1931	11,132	+5.9%
1936	11,155	+0.2%

Year	Pop.	±%
1951	11,679	+4.7%
1961	11,368	−2.7%
1971	10,542	−7.3%
1981	10,112	−4.1%
1991	10,058	−0.5%
2001	9,648	−4.1%
2011	9,161	−5.0%
2021	8,219	−10.3%

Source: ISTAT

== Main sights ==
=== The Castle ===
The construction of the Castle mixes Arab-Norman features with others typical of the castles built during the Hohenstaufen rule of southern Italy: the cube shape recalls Arabic architecture; the square towers, although incorporated into those of the façade, reflect Norman architectural style, as also the battlements; and the round tower recalls aspects of Frederick II's times architecture.

The structure is on three floors, the first floor for the servants, with the essential services, the second for the nobility, with the sumptuous Cappella Palatina, and the third for the court and for guests.

The Cappella Palatina ("Palace Chapel") was built in 1683 by the brothers Giuseppe and Giacomo Serpotta, with a great profusion of precious marble, stuccowork, putti, and friezes that commemorate the most resplendent moments in the history of the House of Ventimiglia. Here is kept the holy relic of the skull of Saint Anne, in an urn that acts as the pedestal to the sculpted bust of Castelbuono's patron saint.

There are also the traditional underground dungeons and a tunnel that leads to the Church of San Francesco.

=== Other sights ===
The church of Matrice Vecchia was built in the 15th century on the ruins of a pagan temple. It has a Renaissance portico added in the 16th century, and a central portal in the Catalan-Gothic style. On the left side is a bell-tower with a Romanesque mullioned window culminating in an octagonal spire covered with majolica tiles. The interior of the church, originally divided into a nave and two aisles, received another aisle at the end of the 16th century. It preserves prized works, most remarkably, above the main altar, a splendid polyptych depicting The Coronation of the Virgin , attributed to Pietro Ruzzolone or possibly Antonello de Saliba. On the bottom right is the unusual figure of a Saint wearing spectacles. On the right is a statue of the Madonna delle Grazie by Antonello Gagini. Below the nave is a fresco depicting the Betrothal of the Virgins showing a strong Senese influence in the elegant features and the symmetry of the composition. Some of the columns separating the nave and the aisles are painted with frescoes, including the figure of St. Catherine of Alexandria.

Other sights include:

- Church of Nativity of Mary (late 16th-early 17th century)
- Church of St. Francis, which has maintained a 14th-century
- Church of Sant'Antonino Martire, including the original Gothic portal
- Fountain of Venere Ciprea (15th century), which decorated the entrance to the ancient Ypsigro
- Civic Museum of Art, located in the castle
- Museum of Nature "Francesco Minà Palumbo"

== Notable people ==
• Enrico II Ventimiglia, one of the main organizers of the Sicilian Vespers, governed the county of Geraci, in 1269 Enrico received the collem sancti Petri de Ypsigro (hill of Saint Peter) from the bishop of Lipari, exchanging it for other lands adjacent to Geraci.

• Francesco Ventimiglia Filangieri, Count of Geraci ( 1280 – 1338 ), Italian nobleman, politician and soldier of the 14th century.

• Giovanni Ventimiglia of Aragon, Marquis of Geraci ( 1383 – 1475 ), Italian nobleman, politician and soldier who lived between the 14th and 15th centuries.

• Francesco "Frank" Lanza, reputedly the first boss of Sicilian-American Mafia family in San Francisco, U.S.A.

• James Lanza, (Born: Mariano Vincenzo Proetto on October 23, 1902, in Castelbuono, to Francesco Proetto and Caterina Albanese – Died: February 14, 2006) was reputedly a Sicilian-American mobster and boss of the San Francisco crime family. He was the son of the first known boss of the San Francisco crime family and took over in 1961.

== Twin towns ==
- Sinaia, Romania
