= Sciortino =

Sciortino may refer to:

- Antonio Sciortino (1879–1947), Maltese sculptor
- Carl Sciortino (born 1978), Massachusetts politician
- Giuseppe Sciortino, Quebec lawyer and activist
- Onofrio Sciortino, San Jose mafia figure
