= James Lanza =

American mobster (1902–2006)

- Born: Mariano Vincenzo Proetto; October 23, 1902; Castelbuono, Sicily, Italy
- Died: February 14, 2006 (aged 103); San Mateo, California, U.S.
- Other name: "Jimmy the Hat"
- Parent(s): Francesco Proetto ("Frank Lanza") and Caterina Albanese

James "Jimmy the Hat" Lanza (October 23, 1902 – February 14, 2006) was a Sicilian-American mobster and boss of the San Francisco crime family. He was the son of the first known boss of the San Francisco crime family and took over in 1961. It is now probably extinct. He was first noticed when Life magazine published his photo in the late 1960s, identifying him as boss of the San Francisco crime family.

== Early life ==
James Lanza was born Mariano Vincenzo Proetto on October 23, 1902, in Castelbuono, Sicily, to Francesco Proetto and Caterina Albanese. In 1905, the family immigrated to New York City. In his adolescence, Francesco adopted the alias "Frank Lanza" and joined a local street gang. In 1920, the family moved to San Francisco where Frank became the leader of the city's mafia family.

== Criminal career ==
=== Underboss ===
During the 1940s and 1950s, James Lanza was underboss of the San Francisco crime family, working under Michael Abati. He represented the San Francisco LCN family's interest from the early 1940s to 1952 before being convicted of failing to report nearly $1 million in unpaid taxes. In 1957, he attended the infamous Apalachin Meeting, representing San Francisco; when the raid happened he was never caught, possibly escaping through the woods with other mobsters. Following the debacle at Apalachin, J. Edgar Hoover ordered FBI field offices to draft lists of "Top Hoodlums" in their areas of responsibility. and the San Francisco office designated Lanza as their contribution to this effort. Because of the Bureau's failure to cultivate informants close to Lanza or insert anyone into his circle, Hoover approved the use of the FBI's black bag squad to break into Lanza's place of business and install an illegal wiretap which ran from 1959 through 1965.

=== Boss ===
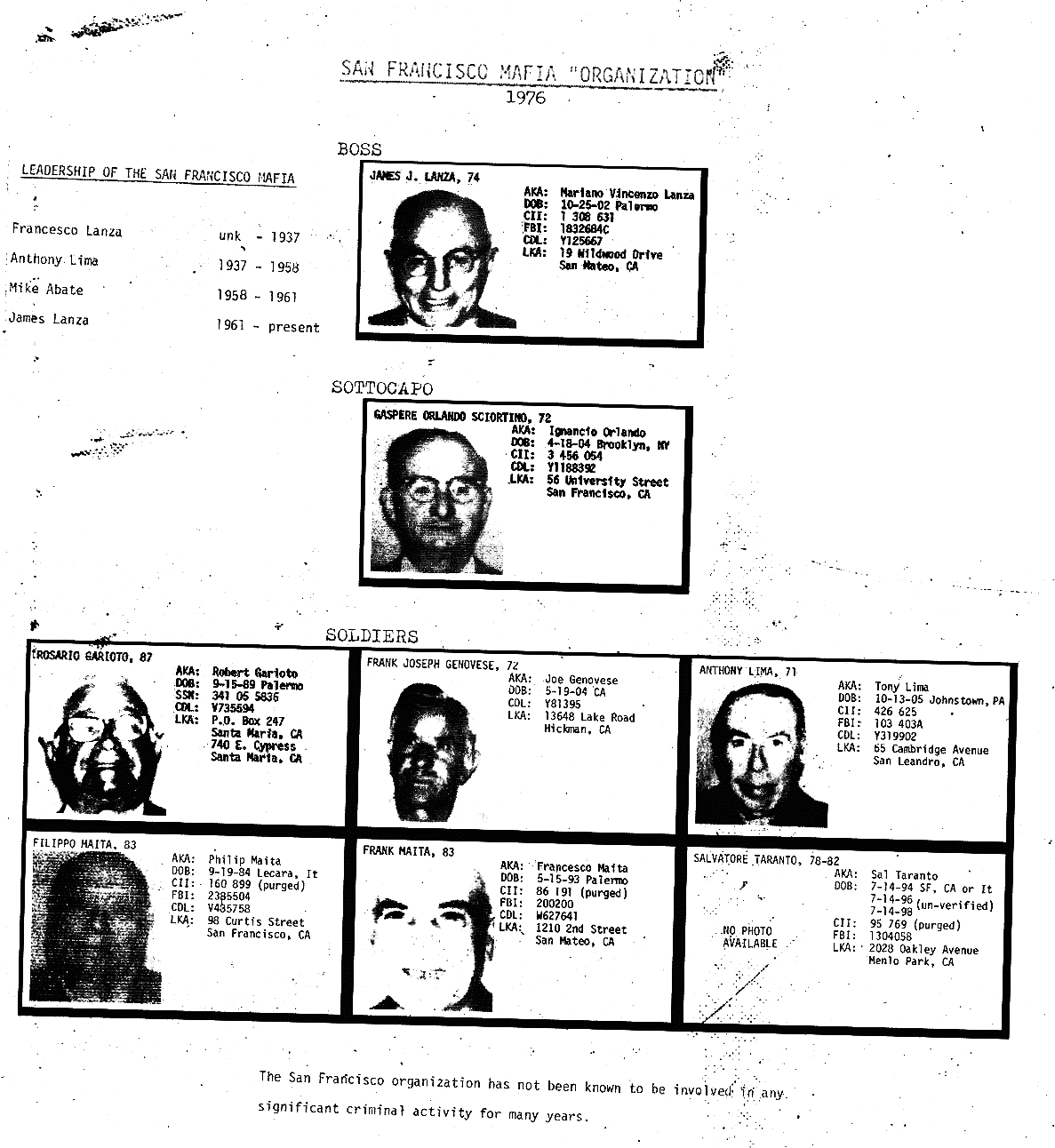
FBI Mafia Chart of San Francisco crime family in 1976

After Michael Abati was indicted and deported back to Italy, Lanza was named boss in 1961, making his underboss, Gaspare "Bill" Sciortino. Lanza soon became the most powerful and successful boss the family ever had; he started making gambling operations, contract hits, and more. Lanza became well connected throughout the country with other mob figures, as well in Las Vegas by his friend William "Bones" Remmer. Remmer was Lanza's link to Las Vegas and started their own casino skim. He became close friends with Joseph Civello, the boss of the Dallas crime family and to Joe Cerrito, the boss of the San Jose crime family. Lanza's picture was published in an article about Cerrito in 1968. His longtime underboss, Gaspare "Bill" Sciortino, was the cousin to the underboss of the Los Angeles crime family Samuel Sciortino, making their connections down south stronger. He had close ties with former mayor of San Francisco, Joseph Alioto. In 1973, Los Angeles crime family member, and former caporegime Jimmy Fratianno moved to the Bay Area. Known as "Jimmy The Weasel", for some reason Lanza disliked Fratianno. He did not trust Fratianno, and was believed to have put a contract on him because he believed Fratianno was bringing too much police, FBI and media attention to the San Francisco family. The Patriarca Mafia Family wanted an informant hit, and Lanza was believed to have given local permission for the murder of a former New England crime family associate. This man turned government witness, Joseph Barboza, was murdered in 1976. As the San Francisco family grew more seasoned, Lanza would lead as his small crime family would grow to include 15-20 made members. Lanza had the misfortune of being one of the first mob bosses to garner media interest, and was linked by Life to Mob boss Carlos Marcello and to Mayor Joseph Alioto. He was considered to be disliked by Jimmy Fratiano.

== Death ==
Lanza died peacefully of natural causes on February 14, 2006, in San Mateo, California. He was 103.
