= Strippergate (Seattle) =

2003 government scandal

Strippergate is the name of a 2003 Seattle government scandal and criminal conspiracy masterminded by Frank Colacurcio Sr., a strip-club magnate, and Frank Colacurcio Jr., his son. Former Washington state governor Al Rosellini assisted the Colacurcios by lobbying six members of the Seattle City Council and raising funds for three of the politicians. The scandal is unrelated to the 2000 scandal in San Diego sometimes called by the same name.

In June 2003, James Bush, a reporter for the North Seattle Sun, reported city council members Judy Nicastro, Jim Compton and Heidi Wills received large amounts of campaign donations from the Colacurcio family and their business associates. Eventually, investigators determined the campaign contributions totaled $36,000. The prosecutor found that no councilmember, Nicastro, Wills or Compton did anything wrong.

At the same time, the Colacurcios were seeking to expand parking at Rick's, their strip club in the Lake City neighborhood of Seattle. The parking expansion required zoning changes and had been rejected in previous years by the city council.

The parking expansion was opposed by the neighbors who lived behind Rick's nightclub. People who lived in Seattle in the 1950s and 1960s knew of Colacurcio Sr.'s reputation. He was known as "Seattle's longest-running crime figure, [and] often was portrayed by law-enforcement officials and the news media as one of Seattle's most notorious racketeering figures."

On June 16, 2003, in a 5–4 vote, the council approved the parking zoning changes allowing them to use their existing land for parking requested by the Colacurcios. Nicastro, Compton and Wills, who had received donations from the Colacurcios and their associates, voted in favor of the parking-lot expansion. This vote was consistent with all their previous land use votes not associated with the Colacurcios.

As the scandal blew up in the press, Seattle P-I writer Lewis Kamb first reported that City Hall insiders were referring to it as "StripperGate" during a July 26, 2003 profile of the elder Colacurcio and his family's notorious past. In part, the story read:

Frank Colacurcio is 86 years old. A halo of white hair and tinted bifocals frame a round face and otherwise shiny pate. The brawn that once described his build in long-yellowed newspaper clippings has mostly vanished with age, much like his name from headlines in recent years. The name is back in newsprint again, enmeshed in what some city insiders call tongue-in-cheek 'StripperGate'—but what Colacurcio dismisses as nothing more than a trumped-up scandal not worth the two-bits that decades ago fed the jukeboxes and pinball machines that helped spawn an adult entertainment empire. Officially, it's Frank Jr.—Colacurcio's 41-year-old only child—who runs the family's nightclub operations now. And officially, it's political donations by Frank Jr. and his associates that are raising eyebrows these days: at least $31,000 split among City Council members Judy Nicastro, Heidi Wills and Jim Compton. More than half of that money went to Nicastro.

The Council members returned all the money.

After investigations by the Seattle Ethics and Elections Commission and the King County Prosecutor's Office, the Colacurcios' associates' donations were revealed to be "political money laundering" according to King County Prosecuting Attorney Norm Maleng. In order to circumvent campaign finance laws, the Colacurcios had given $36,000 to their associates with instructions to contribute the funds to Nicastro, Compton and Wills. The committee further concluded that Nicastro, Compton, and Wills had done nothing wrong and had no knowledge of the source of funds.

In January 2008, the Colacurcios both pleaded guilty to felony charges and paid King County $20,000 in fines for criminal violations. In a civil suit brought by the Seattle Ethics and Elections Commission, the Colacurcios paid $55,000 in fines for breaking city election laws.

Heidi Wills unsuccessfully attempted to return to the Seattle City Council in 2019.
