= Onofrio Sciortino =

American mobster

Onofrio Sciortino was an Italian-American mobster and boss of the San Jose crime family.

== Early career ==
The date of his accomplishments was considered to be 1942. It is almost certain that organized crime existed before this date. Sciortino would derive a majority of his profits from loansharking, gambling and prostitution. He was considered the first official La Cosa Nostra crime boss of San Jose until his death from natural causes on 10 September 1959.

== His successor ==
Sciortino's successor was his underboss, Joseph Cerrito. Cerrito came to America from Sicily during the 1920s and moved to the San Jose area in the early 1940s. During the November 1957 Appalachian Summit of mob bosses, Cerrito was one of many who were caught by law enforcement and would answer to a grand jury on the matter in 1959. In October 1964, Cerrito was identified when he was found meeting Bonanno LCN Family former consigliere Frank Garofalo, at a hotel in Palermo, Sicily. It was believed that the two were discussing the ensuing war within the Bonanno crime family, which would later be dubbed as the "Banana War." Cerrito was a well-accomplished businessman with two car dealerships in San Jose and one in Los Gatos. In the late 1960s, Cerrito and "made" soldier, Pete Misuraca, were implicated but never tried for an attempted extortion plot against a Reno-based resort. In 1968, LIFE Magazine publicly identified Cerrito as the crime boss over San Jose. He sued for libel, but the case was eventually dismissed. He died on 8 September 1978, from natural causes, as one of the most successful crime lords over a very small family.

== Addiction ==
Sciortino was reportedly a gambling addict, often squandering upwards of a million dollars per day. To support his habit, he engaged in extensive racketering, ranging from counterfeiting and shylocking to prostitution and extortion throughout San Jose.

== Death ==
Sciortino died from a massive heart attack in Sicily while reading a newspaper.
