= Colacurcio Organization =

Crime family based in Seattle, Washington

- Founded: 1950s
- Founder: Frank Colacurcio
- Founding location: Seattle, Washington, United States
- Years active: 1950s–2010s
- Territory: Washington
- Criminal activities: Racketeering, prostitution, extortion, money laundering, corruption and fraud
- Allies: Bonanno crime family, San Francisco crime family

The Colacurcio Organization, also known as the Colacurcio crime family, or Seattle family was a criminal organization based in Seattle, Washington, United States.

== History ==
In the 1950s, Frank Colacurcio began operating cigarette and jukebox vending machines in the Seattle area. The vending machine businesses became important to organized crime figures who easily skimmed money. In 1957, Colacurcio began working with Portland crime figure James "Big Jim" Elkins to open prostitution houses in Portland. In the 1960s, Colacurcio opened topless clubs in Seattle and skimmed money. In the 1970s, Colacurcio met with Bonanno crime family member Salvatore "Bill" Bonanno in Yakima, Washington to discuss a business relationship. When questioned about the meeting, Frank Colacurcio replied with "I went to Yakima to pick hot peppers, but I didn’t pick no bananas." The mention of bananas was a reference to the Bonnano family, which was involved in an internal war referred to by the media as the "Banana Wars". In the following years Colacurcio continued to expand his strip-club business.

In 2003, a criminal investigation began in Seattle known as "Strippergate" focusing on strip clubs owned by Frank Colacurcio, Sr. and his son, Frank Colacurcio Jr. In 2008, local police and federal agents raided Colacurcio's home and business. The strip clubs owned by Colacurcio were being used as fronts for brothels.

In 2009, Colacurcio Sr., his son Frank Colacurcio Jr., and four others were indicted and charged with conspiracy and racketeering. In April 2010, Colacurcio Sr.'s nephew Leroy Richard Christiansen along with club manager Steven Michael Fueston, Colacurcio Sr.'s close associate David Carl Ebert, and Colacurcio Sr.'s driver John Gilbert Conte all pleaded guilty to prostitution and racketeering. In June 2010, Colacurcio Jr. pleaded guilty to racketeering and conspiracy. On July 2, 2010, boss Frank Colacurcio, Sr. died at the age of 93.

On September 24, 2010, Frank Colacurcio Jr. was sentenced to one year in prison, fined $1.3 million and ordered to forfeit all interest in the strip clubs and related property worth more than $6 million.
