= Al Capone in popular culture =

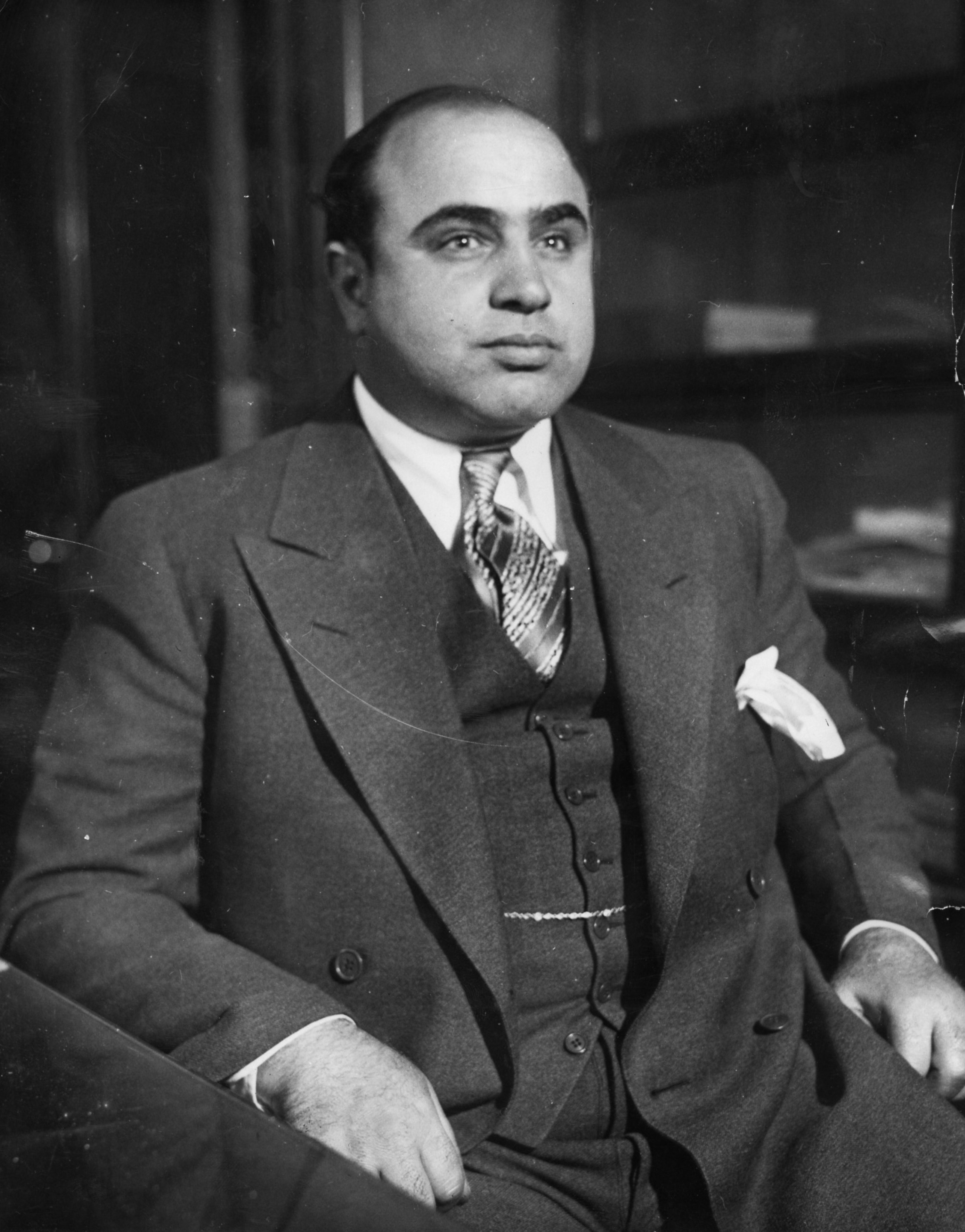
Al Capone in 1930.

Al Capone (1899–1947) is one of the most notorious American gangsters of the 20th century and has been the subject of numerous articles, books, and films. From 1925 to 1929, shortly after Capone relocated to Chicago, he was the most notorious mobster in the country. Capone cultivated an image of himself in the media that fascinated the public. His personality and character have modeled fictional crime lords and criminal masterminds ever since his death. The stereotypical image of a mobster wearing a pinstriped suit and tilted fedora are based on photos of Capone. His accent, mannerisms, facial construction, physical stature, and parodies of his name have represented gangsters in comics, movies, music, and literature.

== Literature ==
- Capone is featured in a segment of Mario Puzo's The Godfather as an ally of New York mob boss Salvatore Maranzano in which he sends two "button men" at the mob boss' request to kill Don Vito Corleone; arriving in New York, the two men are intercepted and brutally killed by Luca Brasi, after which Don Corleone sends a message to Capone warning him not to interfere again, and Capone apparently capitulates.
- Capone appears in Hergé's comic book Tintin in America (1932), one of only two real-life characters in the entire The Adventures of Tintin series. In the original version, Hergé avoided depicting Capone directly, either illustrating the back of his head or hiding his face behind a scarf; this was altered in the 1945 version, in which Capone's face was depicted.
- A reincarnated Capone is a major character in science fiction author Peter F. Hamilton's The Night's Dawn Trilogy.
- Capone's grandniece Deirdre Marie Capone wrote a book titled Uncle Al Capone: The Untold Story from Inside His Family.
- Al Capone is the inspiration for the central character of Tony Camonte in Armitage Trail's novel Scarface (1929), which was adapted into the 1932 film. The novel was later adapted again into the 1983 film with the central character of Tony Montana, by moving the action to then-present-day Miami.
- Jack Bilbo claimed to have been a bodyguard for Capone in his book Carrying a Gun for Al Capone (1932).
- Al Capone is mentioned and met by the main character Moose in the book Al Capone Does My Shirts.

== Film and television ==
Capone has been portrayed on screen by:

- Rod Steiger in Al Capone (1959)
- Neville Brand in the TV series The Untouchables and again in the film The George Raft Story (1961)
- José Calvo in Due mafiosi contro Al Capone (1966)
- Jason Robards in The St. Valentine's Day Massacre (1967)
- Ben Gazzara in Capone (1975)
- Robert De Niro in Brian De Palma's Eliot Ness biopic The Untouchables (1987)
- Ray Sharkey in The Revenge of Al Capone (1989)
- Titus Welliver in Mobsters (1991)
- William Forsythe in The Untouchables (1993–1994)
- F. Murray Abraham in Dillinger and Capone (1995)
- Jon Bernthal in Night at the Museum: Battle of the Smithsonian (2009)
- Stephen Graham in all seasons of the HBO series Boardwalk Empire (2010–2014)
- Jason Jones in Fugget About It, season 1, episode 8: "Al Capone Wears Ladies Underwear" (2012)
- Isaac Keoughan in Legends of Tomorrow (2016)
- Michael Kotsohilis in The Making of the Mob: Chicago (2016)
- Cameron Gharaee in Timeless (2017)
- Milo Gibson in Gangster Land (2017)
- Tom Hardy in Josh Trank's biopic Capone (2020)

Actors playing characters based on Capone include:

- Wallace Beery as Louis "Louie" Scorpio in The Secret Six (1931)
- Ricardo Cortez as Goldie Gorio in Bad Company (1931)
- Paul Lukas as Big Fellow Maskal in City Streets (1931)
- Edward Arnold as Duke Morgan in Okay, America! (1932)
- Jean Hersholt as Samuel "Sam" Belmonte in The Beast of the City (1932)
- Paul Muni as Antonio "Tony" Camonte in Scarface (1932)
- C. Henry Gordon as Nick Diamond in Gabriel Over the White House (1933)
- John Litel as "Gat" Brady in Alcatraz Island (1937)
- Barry Sullivan as Shubunka in The Gangster (1947)
- Ralph Volkie as Big Fellow in The Undercover Man (1949)
- Edmond O'Brien as Fran McCarg in Pete Kelly's Blues (1955)
- B.S. Pully as Big Jule, an intimidating, gun-toting mobster from "East Cicero, Illinois" in the film adaptation of Guys and Dolls (1955), reprising the role that Pully had originated in the Broadway musical.
- Lee J. Cobb as Rico Angelo in Party Girl (1958)
- George Raft as Spats Colombo and Nehemiah Persoff as Little Bonaparte in Some Like It Hot (1959)
- Al Pacino as Tony Montana in Scarface (1983)
- Al Pacino as Alphonse "Big Boy" Caprice in Dick Tracy (1990)

== Music ==
- Prince Buster, Jamaican ska and rocksteady musician, had his first hit in the UK with the single "Al Capone" in 1967.
- Al Capone is referenced heavily in Prodigy's track "Al Capone Zone", produced by The Alchemist and featuring Keak Da Sneak.
- "Al Capone" is a song by Michael Jackson. Jackson recorded the song during the Bad era (circa 1985), but it was not included on the album though he did use some elements from the track for "Smooth Criminal" which did get on the album and was one of Jackson's most popular songs. "Al Capone" was released in September 2012 in celebration of the album's 25th anniversary. By that point however, Jackson had died in 2009 and so he did not see "Al Capone" release during his lifetime.

== Sports ==
- Ultimate Fighting Championship light heavyweight Nikita Krylov was nicknamed "Al Capone".
