= San Jose crime family =

Italian-American crime family

- Founded: c. 1940s
- Founding location: San Jose, California, United States
- Years active: c. 1940s–2000s
- Territory: Primarily the San Francisco Bay Area, with additional territory throughout Northern California
- Ethnicity: Italians as "made men" and other ethnicities as associates
- Membership (est.): 25 made members (1960s)
- Activities: Racketeering, gambling, loansharking, extortion, drug trafficking, counterfeiting, prostitution, assault, and murder
- Allies: Bonanno crime family; Chicago Outfit; Dallas crime family; Los Angeles crime family; San Francisco crime family; Hells Angels MC
- Rivals: Various gangs in the San Jose area

The San Jose crime family, also known as the Cerrito crime family or the San Jose Mafia, was an Italian American Mafia crime family based in San Jose, California. The San Jose family was one of the two families that controlled organized crime in San Jose, within the nationwide criminal organization known as the American Mafia (or "La Cosa Nostra"); the other family that ran organized crime in the city was the Segovia crime family of New York. The family consisted of around 25 "made" members in the 1960s.

== History ==
=== Early history ===
In the early 1940s Onofrio Sciortino founded the first probable organized crime in San Jose, California. would derive a majority of his profits from loansharking, gambling, counterfeiting, prostitution and extortion. He would rule over the San Jose area from the early 1940s until his death on September 10, 1959.

=== Cerrito and the Bonanno family ===
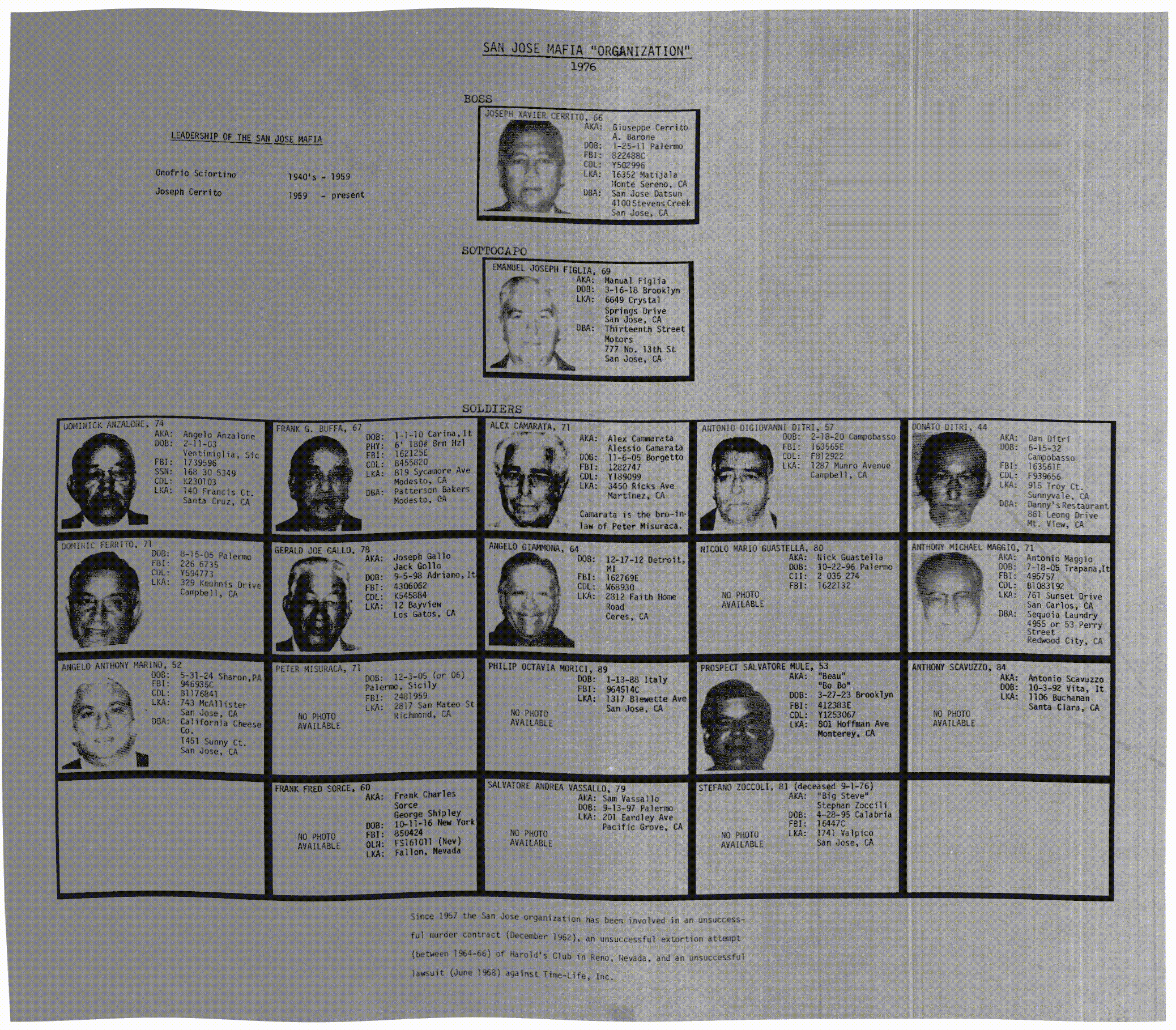
FBI chart of the San Jose family in 1976

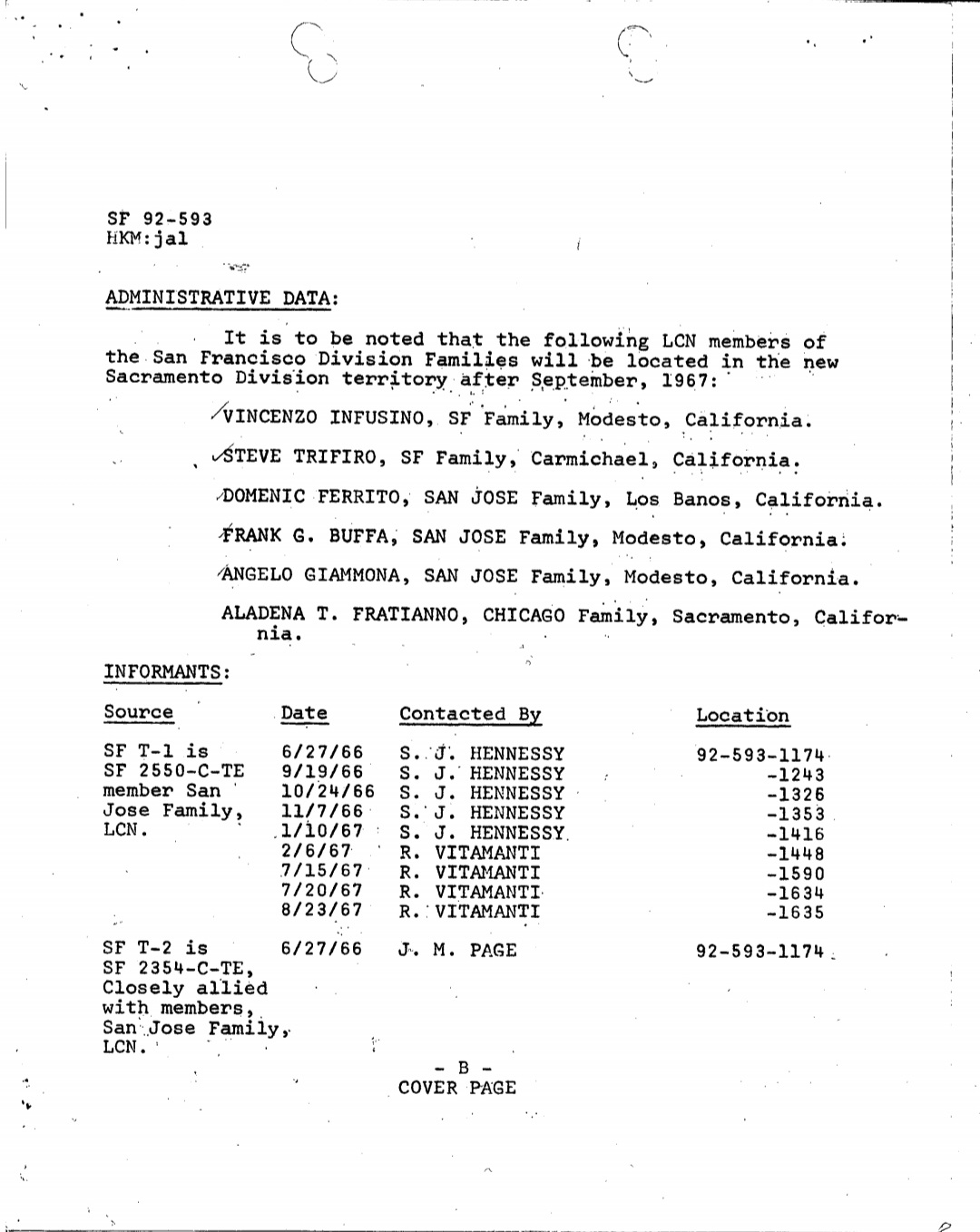
FBI watchlist mentioning members of the San Jose family and other LCN members in the Modesto/Sacramento area

Joseph Cerrito took over the crime family after the death of Sciortino. Cerrito emigrated to the United States from Palermo, Sicily in the late 1920s and eventually settled in San Jose in the early 1940s. He owned three car dealerships in the San Jose area. Cerrito gained some popularity for avoiding being caught at the 1957 mob meeting in Apalachin, New York. In 1964, he was spotted meeting Bonanno crime family former underboss Frank Garofalo at a hotel in Palermo, Sicily. Many believe they were discussing the war within the Bonanno Family. Life Magazine listed Cerrito as the Mafia boss of San Jose in 1968. Angry over the accusation, he sued the company for libel. But the case was later thrown out of court. Cerrito died in 1978 from natural causes.

=== Leadership under Marino ===
A loyal caporegime named Angelo Marino was selected as the new boss over the San Jose rackets in 1978. Marino had close connections with San Francisco mayor Joseph Alioto (served 1968–1974), Marino was close with San Francisco crime family boss James Lanza and Los Angeles consigliere and FBI informant Frank Bompensiero. He owned and operated the California Cheese Company. His father, Salvatore, a longtime member of the Pittsburgh crime family, handed the company to Marino. His company controlled eighty-five percent of the cheese distribution in California and fifty percent west of the Mississippi River. Marino brought over many Sicilian immigrants to work in his cheese factory.

Marino was indicted in October 1977 with his son Salvatore for the murder of Peter Catelli. Peter Catelli had tried to get a job with Marino's company. When Marino refused him a position, Catelli tried to extort $100,000 from Marino. Angelo Marino ordered Catelli's father Orlando to kill him in a trailer on the north side of the California Cheese factory. Orlando refused, and Salvatore then killed Peter and shot Orlando in the head. Orlando survived and testified against the Marinos.

Marino avoided trial for the next three years by claiming illness, but he continued to operate the crime family from a hospital. Joseph Piazza and Thomas Napolitano were also arrested for participating in the attack. On October 12, 1980 Angelo Marino was convicted of second-degree murder and attempted murder. His conviction was overturned on appeals and he was released. Angelo Marino died of a congestive heart failure due to diabetes in February 1983.

=== Figlia as Boss ===
Emmanuel J. Figlia was the boss over the remaining crime family. He was considered an underboss to Marino. In 1998 Salvatore Marino, son of the previously mentioned Angelo, was released from San Quentin Prison. The crime family took a large blow after the deaths of Frank Maestri and Vito Frank Adragna. Adragna died on April 7, 2008, he was 90. Figlia died of natural causes on September 25, 2009. Vito Frank Adragna, a former consigliere in the family, died a year prior.

=== Current status ===
Emmanuel Figlia was the last boss of the crime family. There has been an increase of Asian and Mexican gangs located where the former position of the Cerrito crime family was. The family is now believed to be defunct.

What was thought to be the last surviving member of the family, Donato "Danny" Ditri, died December 9, 2021. He was 89 years old.

== Historical leadership ==
=== Boss ===
- 1940s–1959 — Onofrio Sciortino — died September 10, 1959
- 1959–1978 — Joseph Cerrito — died on September 8, 1978
- 1978–1983 — Angelo Marino — died February 1983
- 1983–2009 — Emmanuel J. Figlia — died September 25, 2009

=== Underboss ===
- 1959–1983 — Emmanuel J. Figlia — became boss

== Former members ==
- Dominic "Dom" Anzalone — identified as a soldier in 1976. Born in 1903. Anzalone was initially a member of the Pittsburgh crime family, before moving to San Jose in 1960. In 1967, Anazalone had successfully won an appeal of deportation from the United States to Italy. According to the May 1978 Organized Crime Control Commission by California Attorney General, Evelle J. Younger, Anzalone was alleged to be active in bookmaking and illegal coin machine operations. He died in 1983.
- Vito Adragna — former soldier. Born in May 1917. Adragna was previously associated with the Pittsburgh crime family. In January 1970, Adragna was convicted of bookmaking, he was sentenced to 1 year of probation and fined $400, although Adragna was acquitted of fixing a horse race. He died in April 2008.

== See also ==
- List of Italian Mafia crime families
- Organized crime in California
