= Frank Colacurcio =

American mobster

- Born: Frank Colacurcio; June 18, 1917; Seattle, Washington, U.S.
- Died: July 2, 2010 (aged 93); Seattle, Washington, U.S.
- Resting place: Acacia Memorial Park; Lake Forest Park, Washington
- Occupation: Crime boss
- Children: Frank Colacurcio Jr.
- Allegiance: Colacurcio Organization

Francis Colacurcio Sr. (June 18, 1917 – July 2, 2010) was an American mobster and boss of the Colacurcio Organization known for running strip clubs in Seattle, Washington. He was a subject of ongoing federal investigations into organized crime in the city and was suspected of being an organized crime boss.

== Early life ==
Born to immigrant parents from southern Italy, Colacurcio was the eldest of nine children, and worked on his father's vegetable farm in Seattle. He dropped out of school before completing the eighth grade and started a produce-hauling business. Colacurcio later worked as a butcher, farm hand, truck driver, and pulp mill worker. By age 18, he had opened his first trucking company.

In 1943, Colacurcio was convicted for having sex with an underage girl. He served more than a year at the Monroe State Reformatory (now known as the Washington State Reformatory).

== Career ==
In the 1950s, Colacurcio entered the jukebox, cigarette, and vending machine businesses. Business rivals claimed that he used threats to control the trade. With money earned from these businesses, Colacurcio started investing in bars, restaurants, and clubs. To avoid trouble obtaining liquor licenses, Colacurcio had relatives and associates front as the business owners. In 1957, he was subpoenaed to testify before the U.S. Senate Rackets Committee. Although Colacurcio never testified, Committee Counsel Robert F. Kennedy did question him about his alleged racketeering activities in Seattle.

In the 1960s, Colacurcio acquired more interests in restaurants and nightclubs. In 1962, he opened a beer garden at the Seattle World's Fair.

In 2003, law enforcement launched a criminal investigation in the Seattle area known as "Strippergate." The investigation focused on Frank Sr, Frank Jr., and former Washington Governor Albert Rosellini for bribing members of the Seattle City Council. In 2005, both Frank Sr. and Frank Jr. were indicted, but in February 2006 the judge dismissed the charges. Rosellini was not charged in the investigation.

In March 2006, the FBI started a multi-agency task force to investigate alleged organized crime, racketeering, and cold case murders tied to Frank Sr. In April 2006, the state supreme court reinstated money laundering and political corruption charges from Strippergate charges against Frank Sr. and Frank Jr.

On June 2, 2008, local police and federal agents raided Frank Sr.'s home in Lake Forest Park, the Talents West offices, and multiple strip clubs in three counties.

On June 30, 2009, Frank Sr., Frank Jr., and four associates were indicted by a federal grand jury on racketeering and other charges stemming from years-long investigations into allegations of prostitution and money laundering. Frank Jr., 48, pleaded guilty to a racketeering-conspiracy charge in June 2010. In exchange, federal prosecutors agreed to dismiss fourteen other charges. He was sentenced in September to a year in jail and fined $1.3 million.

== Death ==
In declining health, Colacurcio died at the age of 93 of heart failure, on July 2, 2010, at the University of Washington Medical Center in Seattle; he was buried at Acacia Memorial Park in Lake Forest Park.
