= San Francisco crime family =

Mafia syndicate (1928–2006)

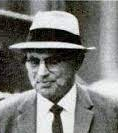
- Family boss James Lanza
- Founded: c. 1928; 98 years ago
- Founder: Francesco Lanza
- Founding location: San Francisco, California, United States
- Years active: c. 1928–2006
- Territory: Primarily the San Francisco Bay Area, with additional territory throughout Northern California
- Ethnicity: Italians as "made men" and other ethnicities as associates
- Membership (est.): 15–20 made members (1960s)
- Activities: Racketeering, gambling, bookmaking, loansharking, extortion, narcotics trafficking, gun running, bootlegging, hijacking, bribery, prostitution, assault, and murder
- Allies: Bonanno crime family; Chicago Outfit; Dallas crime family; Detroit Partnership; Genovese crime family; Los Angeles crime family; San Jose crime family
- Rivals: Various gangs in the San Francisco area

The San Francisco crime family, also known as the Lanza crime family or the San Francisco Mafia, was an Italian American Mafia crime family based in San Francisco, California. The syndicate was organized in the early 1930s by Francesco "Frank" Lanza and mainly originated in the Little Italy neighborhood of North Beach. The membership of the San Francisco family peaked at around 15 or 20 "made men" under the leadership of James "Jimmy the Hat" Lanza, who became boss of the family in 1961.

== History ==
On April 28, 1928, a gang war started in San Francisco when bootlegger Jerry Feri, San Francisco's leading crime lord, was murdered in his apartment. His suspected murderer, Alfredo Scariso, was an accomplished bootlegger as well, and he too was murdered on December 19 of that year. His body was found with multiple gunshot wounds and dumped in the area of Fair Oaks. On December 23, Mario Filippi, a suspect behind the Scariso murder, was found shot to death. Frank Boca, another suspect in Scariso's death, was found murdered in his car on July 30, 1929.

The next murder was that of the so-called "Al Capone of the West", Genaro Broccolo, who was found dead on October 14, 1930. The final murder was of Luigi Malvese. He had made a reputation as a hijacker, bootlegger and gun running racketeer. He was shot down on May 18, 1932, while walking through an Italian neighborhood in the middle of the day.

=== Francesco Lanza ===
Francesco "Frank" Lanza became San Francisco's first crime boss after the initial war ended in 1932. Lanza guided the crime family during the prohibition era. He was the co-owner of San Francisco's Fisherman's Wharf and a bootlegger, pimp, loan shark and drug dealer. The Lanza gang proved to be the strongest gang after murdering San Francisco gang leader Luigi Malvese on May 18, 1932.

Lanza derived his income from loansharking, gun running, prostitution, gambling and narcotics. Lanza founded the famous Fisherman's Wharf along with his partner Giuseppe Alioto. After Lanza's death on July 14, 1937, he was succeeded by Anthony Lima.

=== Lima and Abati ===
Anthony Lima took over the crime family. Lima and his underboss, Michael Abati, planned the 1947 murder of Chicago gangster, Nick De John. Nick De John lived at 60 El Verano then moved to Santa Rosa, living as Nicolo Rossi. In May 1947, De John was found in the trunk of his car in at 3004 Laguna St., San Francisco. In 1949, both were tried for the murder. The charges were dropped when District Attorney Pat Brown dismissed the jury and called a mistrial due to a lack of confidence in key witness, Anita Venza. Lima lost power after he was convicted on April 27, 1953, of grand theft and sentenced to a California State Prison. Michael Abati replaced Lima as boss. His underboss James "Jimmy the Hat" Lanza was one of many Mafia leaders spotted by the police at the 1957 Apalachin Meeting. In 1961, Abati was deported to Italy for being involved in criminal activity and died of natural causes on September 5, 1962.

=== Jimmy "the Hat" Lanza ===
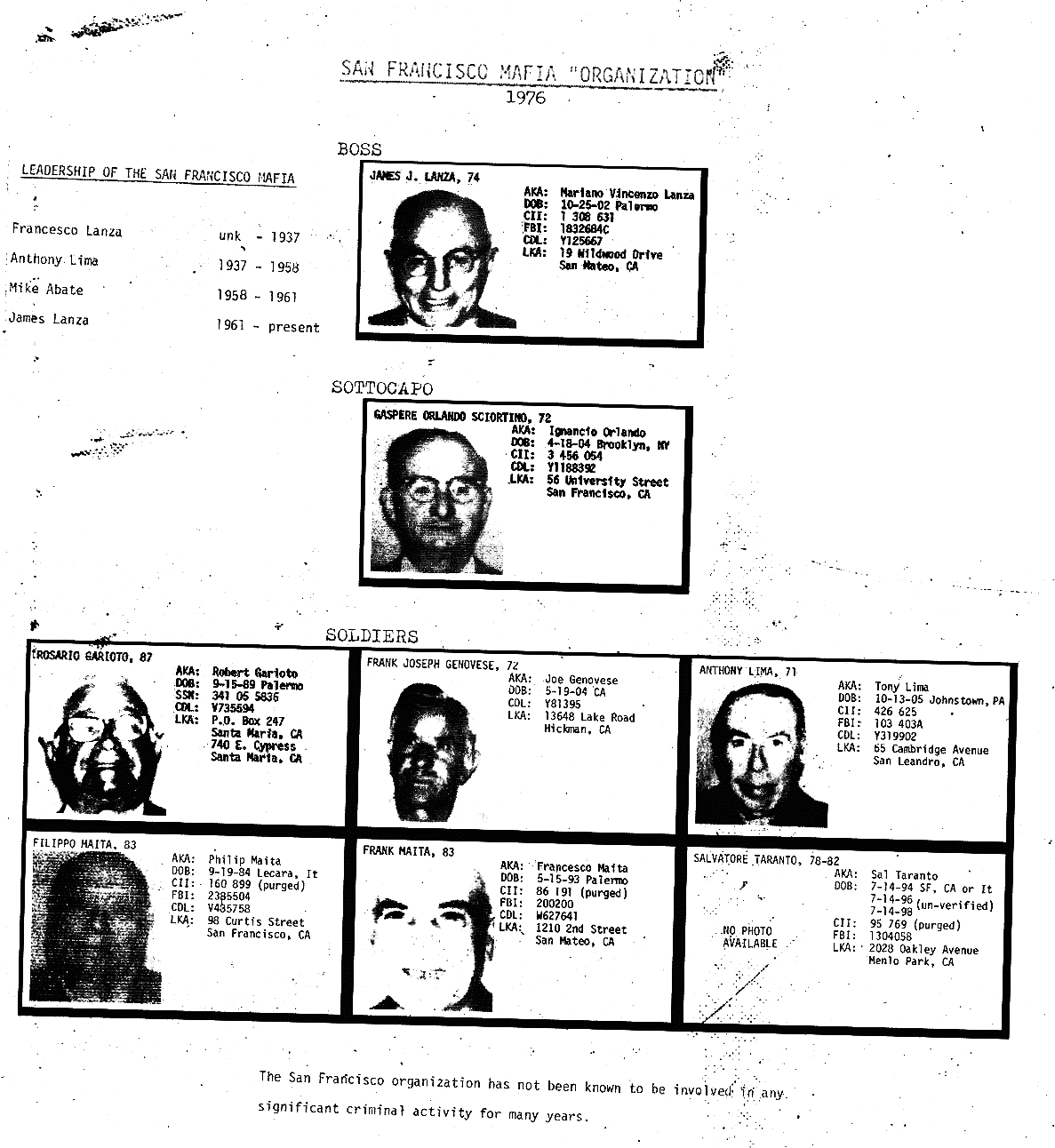
FBI chart of the San Francisco family in 1976

Francesco Lanza's son, James Lanza, became the syndicate's new head. Lanza held the position from 1961 to 2006 during which he extended the family's connection through other syndicates. LIFE Magazine published his picture and listed him as the crime boss of San Francisco in the late 1960s. Lanza had a close friendship with San Francisco mayor Joseph Alioto. This allegation has been denied by Alioto. Lanza was well connected in Las Vegas via his friend William "Bones" Remmer, a Jewish associate with ties to the Genovese crime family of New York.

Lanza became wary of the serious damage that defectors could cause and took precautions against the risk of turncoats like Joseph Valachi. As a result, he brought very little new blood into the San Francisco mob as the membership aged. Lanza also made solid ties with other bosses, including Joseph Civello of Dallas and Joseph Cerrito of San Jose. His longtime underboss, Gaspare "Bill" Sciortino was the cousin to the underboss of the Los Angeles crime family Samuel Sciortino.

In his book, "Jimmy the Weasel" Fratianno said he reported to Lanza in 1973 when he moved to the Bay Area after his release from prison. A few years later, Lanza ended his friendship with Fratianno. Lanza complained about him being in San Francisco. In 1977, when Fratianno heard he had a hit on him, one of the charges was that he was bringing too much attention to the existence of the San Francisco crime family. Lanza was believed to have given permission for the murder of former New England crime family associate turned government witness Joseph Barboza in 1976.

By 1990, there were only a few made men left in the San Francisco mob, one was Sergio Maranghi, who was involved in cocaine and heroin trafficking. Maranghi moved to the U.S. from Florence, Italy in 1975 and eventually settled in San Francisco in 1978. He first began working as an employee of Starfish Co., a small fish processing company, which did a lot of business with Alioto's Restaurant.

In 1980 Maranghi opened the Anchor Bay Cafe in North Beach. Lanza quickly noticed Maranghi's ability as a money maker and soon made him a member of the crime family. Maranghi was spotted many times meeting with Lanza and other San Francisco mob figures at the Anchor Bay Cafe until it closed down in 1983. He was one of many involved in a cocaine bust in October 1991. Maranghi decided to become an FBI informant instead of serving a long prison sentence and told federal agents of cocaine transactions he had had with his associates over a period of several years.

Another man arrested was Gaetano Balistreri, a San Francisco mob associate, who owned the Portofino Cafe on Columbus Ave. Balistreri was arrested for distributing cocaine, but the charge was eventually dropped. In 1994, the San Francisco Police raided the Portofino and arrested Balistreri again, this time for running an illegal gambling operation with video poker machines. Another made member still living at the time was Steve Trifiro, who ran a small gambling operation near Sacramento, California.

Lanza died of natural causes on February 14, 2006. He was 103.

== Historical leadership ==
=== Boss ===
- 1932–1937: Francesco "Frank" Lanza—died on July 14, 1937
- 1937–1958: Anthony Lima—imprisoned
- 1958–1961: Michael Abati—deported
- 1961–2006: James Lanza—died on February 14, 2006

=== Underboss ===
- 1932–1937: Anthony Lima—became boss
- 1937–1953: Michael Abati—became boss
- 1953–1961: James Lanza—became boss
- 1961–unknown: Gaspare Orlando "Bill" Sciortino—stepped down

== See also ==
- North Beach, San Francisco

General:

- List of Italian Mafia crime families
- Organized crime in California
