= Angelo Meli =

Italian-American mobster

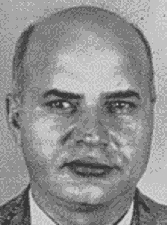
- Born: February 10, 1897; San Cataldo, Sicily, Kingdom of Italy
- Died: December 1, 1969 (aged 72); Fort Lauderdale, Florida, U.S.
- Resting place: Holy Sepulchre Cemetery, Southfield, Michigan, U.S.
- Citizenship: American
- Occupation: Mobster
- Children: 4
- Relatives: Bill Bufalino (nephew-in-law); Vincent Meli (nephew); Jack Tocco (son-in-law); William Tocco (co-father-in-law)
- Allegiance: Detroit Partnership

Angelo Meli (Italian: [ˈandʒelo ˈmɛːli]; February 10, 1897 – December 1, 1969) was an Italian-American mobster who became a consigliere and then leading Chairman of the Detroit Partnership criminal organization of La Cosa Nostra.

== Early life ==
Angelo Meli was born on February 10, 1897, in San Cataldo, Sicily, the youngest son of 13 children, born to Vincenzo Meli and Maria Antonia Gugaglio. Meli immigrated to the United States at the age of 17, settling in Scranton, Pennsylvania, to work as a coal miner. He worked in a Pittsburgh foundry and moved to Detroit in 1918. In Detroit, Meli worked as a baker and restaurateur. Throughout his time there, he owned a bakery, two restaurants, and the Whip Cafe, which he owned with "Black" Leo Cellura, another member of the Detroit Partnership.

His brother Frank and nephew Vincent "Little Vince" Meli were members of the Detroit Partnership.

In 1924, Meli married Jennie Dimercurio, and had two sons, Vincent H. and Salvatore, and two daughters, Maria Antoinette and Angela. In May 1929, Meli became a naturalized citizen at the age of 32 through the US District Court in Brooklyn, New York. Before his death, he had 16 grandchildren.

In 1945, Meli's niece, Marie Antoinette Meli, married attorney Bill Bufalino, a cousin of Northeastern Pennsylvania mob boss Russell Bufalino. In 1950, Meli's son, Vincent, married Pauline Perrone, daughter of Santo Perrone, a Detroit bootlegger. In 1952, his daughter Maria, married Detroit Mafia boss Jack Tocco, son of mob boss William Tocco.

== Criminal career ==
Angelo Meli moved to the city of Detroit in 1915 and soon became affiliated with the Gianola Mob. In 1919, in the wake of the Gianola-Vitale War, 'Singing' Sam Catalanotte, Meli, Chester LaMare, and Leo Cellura started the West Side Mob of Hamtramck, Michigan.

In the early 1920s, backed by former Gianola gang member Sam Catalanotte's liquor and vice rackets, Meli, Cellura, and LaMare opened up the Venice Cafe in Detroit. The West Side Mob excelled in extorting brothels, gambling houses and bootlegging operations. With Meli's assistance, LaMare soon dominated crime in Detroit. It required an effort by state investigators on recommendations from Michigan Governor, Alex Groesbeck, to smash the organization. Thirty-one criminals were convicted of liquor law violations, however, Meli escaped without convictions. In the midst of the investigation, Leo Cellura and Angelo Meli left the Westside Mob in Hamtramck. In doing so, Meli entered into an agreement with Salvatore Catalanotte, boss of Detroit's Unione Siciliana. With Catalanotte's support, Meli formed the Eastside Mob with top aides Leo Cellura, William Tocco, and Joseph Zerilli. Catalanotte was instrumental in establishing the partnership between the Eastside Mob and the River Gang and other Jewish groups. LaMare, on the other hand, was arrested and sentenced to one year in prison amidst the Hamtramck investigations, but was eventually let off with a fine in 1926 for violating Prohibition laws. By 1927 he was able to resume his position as the leader of the Westside Mob.

After Catalanotte's death on February 14, 1930, LaMare and the West Side Mob began raiding Meli-controlled speakeasies, and liquor storage houses. Meli responded by ordering LaMare's murder, which happened on February 6, 1931. After LaMare's murder, Meli oversaw the merger of Detroit's various mob factions into what later became the Detroit Partnership. Despite Meli's reputation as a mafioso in Detroit, and 16 attempts for his arrest for crimes including murder and armed robbery between 1915 and 1963, Meli was only ever convicted of a concealed carry charge in 1920. His bail was forfeited in 1921 due to his not showing up to court.

== The Crosstown Mafia War (1930-1931) ==
Angelo Meli was believed to be the leader of the dominant wing of warring Detroit gangs in 1930. It is theorized that Chester LaMare sought to eliminate Meli and Zerrilli as rivals by setting up a phony peace meeting at the Vernor Highway Fish Market on May 31. Meli, wary, sent Gaspare Scibilia and Sam Parina in his place and they were shot and killed by LaMare gangsters. Following these murders, LaMare went into hiding.

Following was a slew of other mob-related murders, collectively known as the Crosstown Mafia War. It is believed that both West and East Side Gangs of Detroit, including that of Angelo Meli, were involved in these killings. According to deputy chief of detectives Robert A. MacPherson, Zerilli claimed that Meli gangsters were not engaging in this warfare, but merely seeking to kill LaMare. However, police actively pursued Meli for his suspected involvement. Thomas Licavoli and Frank Cammarata—two of the three suspected trigger-men in the notorious killing of Gerald "Jerry" Buckley on May 31, 1930—were believed to be Meli gangsters. Eight associates of Meli, in total, were arrested in connection with the Buckley murder. Nick Dellabonte—who, alongside Frank Salimone, was charged with the murder of patrolman Clause Lanstra on June 1, 1930—was the brother-in-law of Angelo Meli. Dellabonte admitted to hiding from police in Meli's home for the month following the murders. On October 27, 1930, police raided Meli's Capitol Coal Co. seeking Meli for questioning and discovered machine gun shipments. It was also discovered that Meli had been armoring his automobiles in Detroit. Seven of Meli's men were subpoenaed by police, but he was still in hiding at the time.

LaMare was to testify against rival gangs of Leo Cellura, William Tocco, Meli, and Zerilli, but he was slain six hours before he was scheduled to appear as a witness in court, on February 7, 1931. It is believed he was either executed in retaliation for Scibilia's death, or to prevent his testimony. Police determined that Elmer Macklin and Joe Antico, both members of LaMare's own gang, were responsible for his murder. They speculated that Meli's gang orchestrated this assassination and that the perpetrators were threatened with death if they failed.

== After the establishment of the Partnership ==
Once the Detroit Partnership was established, Meli became the first and longest serving consigliere. He was considered to be one of the five members of the Ruling Council of the Partnership, along with Joseph Zerilli, Peter Licavoli, Black Bill Tocco, and John Priziola. He was a major figure in illegal weapons smuggling and in settling labor disputes. Smuggling liquor across the border from Canada was also a very lucrative practice for Meli and the Partnership. Meli's involvement in labor racketeering helped establish Jimmy Hoffa's rise in the Teamsters Union. He suffered only one conviction; on charges of carrying a concealed weapon. Meli had extensive legitimate business holdings in Michigan area, including a motel, a farm, a trucking company, a gas station, and two different music stores. He also had holdings in a warehouse and a cold storage facility.

Meli's family was very interconnected with the rest of the Detroit mafia community. His son, Vincent H. Meli (not to be confused with his nephew, Vincent A. Meli), married Pauline Perrone, daughter of Detroit mobster Santo Perrone, while his daughter Maria would go on to marry Jack Tocco, the eventual head of the Detroit Partnership. In 1957, the US government unsuccessfully attempted to deport Meli, on the grounds that he had lied about his criminal record on his application for citizenship. Over time, as Meli's health declined, he began to spend less time working with the Partnership, and spent more time at his residence in Fort Lauderdale, Florida.

== Death ==
Meli died at his Fort Lauderdale residence on December 1, 1969. On December 6, 1969, he was buried in Holy Sepulchre Cemetery in Southfield, Michigan.

American Mafia
Unknown	Detroit Partnership; Consigliere; 1931–1969	Succeeded by John Priziola
