= Anthony Joseph Zerilli =

Italian-American mobster (1927–2015)

- Born: October 24, 1927; Detroit, Michigan, U.S.
- Died: March 31, 2015 (aged 87); Weston, Florida, U.S.
- Other name: “Tony Z”
- Parent(s): Joseph Zerilli; Josephine Finazzo
- Allegiance: Detroit Partnership

Anthony 'Tony' Joseph Zerilli (October 24, 1927 - March 31, 2015) was an Italian-American mobster from Sterling Heights, Michigan. From 1949 he was one of the majority owners of the highly profitable Hazel Park Raceway. In 1970 he succeeded his father Joseph Zerilli as head of the Detroit Partnership ("The Partnership") criminal organization.

After Zerilli was convicted and imprisoned in 1974, his father came out of retirement to lead the organization until his death in 1977, when Jack Tocco became head of the Partnership. Anthony Zerilli was later his deputy. The Detroit Partnership is believed to be part of the American Cosa Nostra.

== Early life and education ==
Anthony (Tony) Joseph Zerilli was born in Detroit, Michigan on October 24, 1927, to Josephine (Finazzo) and Joseph Zerilli. At the time of Tony's birth, his father was an up-and-coming member of the Eastside Mob under the direction of Angelo Meli and his cousin and brother-in-law Vito William Tocco.

As a teenager, Tony worked at the Detroit Italian-American Bakery in Roseville, Michigan. In 1947, Tony reportedly became a made man in the Partnership by murdering Gust Andromalus in a Detroit basement as ordered by the Partnership. Like his cousin Jack Tocco, Zerilli graduated from the University of Detroit in 1949.

== Hazel Park Raceway and the Spaghetti Palace ==
In 1949, Zerilli became president of the Hazel Park Racing Association and Track in Hazel Park, Michigan, a suburb of Detroit. Originally planned as an auto track, Hazel Park Raceway was the first modern 5/8-mile horse racing track in Michigan. With family help, Zerilli had purchased a controlling interest in the operation for US$50,000.

Over the next twenty-three years, Hazel Park produced an estimated $15,000,000 a year in revenue, netting an annual profit for its investors of $1,200,000. During this period state law limited pari-mutuel betting to the races run at the track. Although listed as the number one man in the Hazel Park operation, Zerilli is thought to have deferred to his cousin Jack Tocco in business dealings.

Hazel Park was such a financial success that in August 1970 Zerilli, Tocco, and Dominic "Fats" Corrado decided to develop another race track. The three men invested $2,500,000 in 280 acres (1.1 km^{2}) of land in Hollywood, Florida, to construct a second horse racing complex. But the second project, to be called Hazel Park South, was cancelled after Zerilli ran into legal problems in Las Vegas.(See below) Because of his legal difficulties, Zerilli cancelled the Hazel Park South project; in 1972, he and his partners sold the Hazel Park Raceway in Michigan. Zerilli made $780,000 from his 92,634 shares.

With this revenue, Zerilli invested in several other businesses, including the Spaghetti Palace restaurant, established in 1968 near the Macomb Mall in Roseville, Michigan. Zerilli used this restaurant as his headquarters. It continued as a popular venue in Roseville under the direction of Joseph Zerilli, Rosalie Zerilli and Jack Giannosa before closing in the early 1990s.

== Trouble in Las Vegas ==
During the early 1960s, Zerilli began spending a good portion of his time in Las Vegas, where various Mob families from the East had invested. He was watching over the Partnership's investments while seeking new chances to expand his family's influence in that city. Zerilli and Michael Polizzi approached mob "connection man" "Handsome Johnny" Roselli about buying a casino. Roselli introduced the pair to Maurice Friedman, a developer and casino owner with a string of arrests dating back to the 1950s.

Friedman was in the process of developing the New Frontier Hotel and Casino on the Las Vegas Strip. In 1964, when the Nevada Gaming Commission denied gaming licenses to Zerilli and Polizzi, Friedman agreed to act as a front boss for the two men. But, Friedman was also rejected for a license by the Commission. Zerilli and Polizzi eventually gained access to the casino when the Commission approved former municipal judge Arthur Rooks, from Hamtramck, Michigan; and Irving Shapiro, owner of the Toledo Hotel, as key operators in the Frontier. Friedman later testified that he was set up in the Frontier to oversee the development and financing on orders from Zerilli and other unseen Partnership members from Detroit.

Zerilli was soon forced out of Las Vegas. Friedman had been tried and convicted of cheating the Friars Club of Beverly Hills, California, and was facing a long prison sentence. In a plea deal for reduced prison time, Friedman agreed to testify against his Detroit bosses. As a result, Zerilli, Polizzi, Jack Shapiro and lawyer Peter J. Bellanca were convicted of skimming approximately $250,000 a month from the Frontier for more than two years. In 1967, Johnny Roselli arranged the sale of the Frontier to billionaire industrialist Howard Hughes for $25 million.

In 1970, Zerilli was chosen to succeed his father, who had retired, as boss of the Detroit Partnership. His reign lasted until 1974, when he was convicted and sent to prison on charges related to the Frontier Hotel and Casino case. After his son was imprisoned, Joseph Zerilli emerged from retirement to lead the Partnership until his death in October 1977. His nephew Jack Tocco was chosen to succeed Zerilli's father as the new boss. Tony Zerilli was imprisoned until 1979. After returning to Detroit, he took his place as the underboss of the Detroit Partnership alongside his cousin.

The Tocco/Zerilli regime led the Detroit Mafia while keeping out of the news and maintaining distance from law enforcement. But on March 15, 1996, Zerilli, Jack Tocco, and 15 other alleged Partnership members and associates were indicted on a 25-count federal charge of violating the Racketeer Influenced and Corrupt Organizations Act (RICO). They were charged with conspiracy to control illegal gambling within the Detroit area for the previous 30 years, involvement with hidden casino interests in Las Vegas, and alleged involvement with the criminal organization known as the "American Mafia" or "La Cosa Nostra," known to run organized crime in the United States. Zerilli and the rest of the alleged crime family leaders were freed on bail to await trial.

Zerilli's lawyers gained postponement of the trial indefinitely due to his ill health. The trial eventually began in February 1998; on April 29, 1998, the jury returned its verdicts. Anthony Joseph "Jack" Tocco was found guilty on 12 counts, including two counts of racketeering, eight counts of extortion, and two counts of attempted extortion. Zerilli was convicted on several counts, but his lawyers arranged bail and he was free while the case was being appealed. The appeal was heard August 19, 2002, and the court upheld his convictions. Zerilli faced U.S. District Court judge, Lawrence Zatkoff on November 7, 2002, for sentencing.

Zerilli was remanded to prison in late 2002. In November 2007 he was serving the final months of his sentence in a halfway house in the Detroit area, with projected release date April 6, 2008. He was expected to resume leadership of the remains of the Detroit Mafia, one of the original 24 American Mafia crime families that is documented as having controlled organized crime in the United States from the 1930s to the 1990s. Although not as powerful as it was at one time, the Detroit Mafia is believed by state and federal investigators to be one of roughly 10 Mafia crime families in the United States that are highly influential in the American underworld.

== One-time boss ==
By 1964, Zerilli was recognized as the leader of his own unit or "crew" within the Detroit Mafia. The young Zerilli had a heightened status as a mid-level mobster not only within the Detroit underworld, but within the national underworld. The Zerilli family was trying to increase its power over the Detroit underworld, mainly in the areas of gambling and labor racketeering.

Zerilli and various influential underlings were recorded by law enforcement bugs discussing various criminal plots, including gambling operations, kidnapping International Brotherhood of Teamsters chief Jimmy Hoffa, police payoff policies, and the easing of internal disputes. The tapes recorded in the offices of Anthony Giacalone, between 1961 and 1964, demonstrated Zerilli's position in the Partnership. He was not included on the crime families' charts during the Valachi Hearings. At one point Giacalone complained bitterly about Pete Licavoli's dominance of area gambling operations, although Licavoli had not lived in the Detroit area for many years. Zerilli tried to placate Giacalone, and promised to have the matter heard before his father Joseph Z. Zerilli, then head of the Partnership, and Papa John Priziola, the only two remaining senior members of the chair who could sit in judgement of Licavoli.

Shortly after these tapes were recorded, Zerilli succeeded his father, who retired. After the younger Zerilli was convicted and imprisoned, his father came out of retirement until his own death in 1977. The younger Zerilli was demoted while in prison; his cousin, Jack Tocco, son of Detroit Partnership patriarch, Giacomo "Jack" Tocco, was named as the head of the family. Zerilli was later named as underboss and allegedly remained in this highly powerful position within the organization.

On April 4, 2008, Zerilli was released from federal prison; he was "put on the shelf" or demoted in 2008.

== Claims as to the location of the remains of Jimmy Hoffa ==
Labor leader Jimmy Hoffa disappeared in July 1975 and was believed to have been killed. His body was never found. There was speculation that it was a mob hit. On January 13, 2013, NBC New York's Marc Santia reported that Zerilli claimed to know the location of Hoffa's remains. Santia had formerly reported for NBC in Detroit and said that he was approached by Zerilli for an interview. In the broadcast, Zerilli said that Hoffa was buried in a "shallow grave" in a field in Oakland County, 20 miles north of the now-closed Bloomfield Township restaurant Machus Red Fox, where Hoffa was last seen alive.

The Detroit Free Press reported that this alleged burial site was near the intersection of Buell and Adams roads, on a property reportedly previously owned by reputed Detroit crime boss Jack Tocco. Zerilli said in the Santia NBC report that "they" intended to move the body to a permanent grave in the upstate Rogers City area, but that Hoffa's remains were never reinterred.

At the time of Hoffa's disappearance, Zerilli had been in prison after being convicted on charges related to Las Vegas casino skimming. In his interview with Santia, he denied any involvement in the Hoffa affair, claiming to be his "friend", and saying that he thought of Hoffa as a "gentleman." While suggesting that he was privy to unspecified knowledge of Detroit Partnership activities, Zerilli added, "I would've...if I wasn't away (in prison) I don't think it (the Hoffa disappearance) would've even happened."

On June 17, 2013, Detroit media outlets reported that the FBI was in the process of excavating a large tract of the Buell Road parcel in Oakland County. No remains were found.

== Going public ==
In his interview with Santia, Zerilli said he was "dead broke." He reportedly hired a publicist, launched a website, and discussed plans for an exposé, all unprecedented for such a crime figure.

== Family feud ==
On January 16, 2013, The Macomb Daily reported that Zerilli had spoken about Hoffa not only to create interest in his actions but as a result of a growing rift between Jack Tocco, the head of the family, and him. This may have dated to the early 1970s, when the former partners were involved in business dealings in Detroit and Las Vegas.

Quoted in the Daily's report, former U.S. Attorney Keith Corbett said, “There is a good deal of acrimony between Tony and his cousin, Jack...and the resentment goes both ways."
