= Salvatore Catalanotte =

American mobster (1893–1930)

Salvatore "Sam" Catalanotte (born Catalanotto; February 15, 1893 – February 14, 1930) was an Italian-American mobster. He was also nicknamed "Sam Sings in the Night", from a literal translation of a close misspelling of his last name (Italian canta la notte). Catalanotte immigrated from Sicily to Detroit in 1912 and participated and survived the Giannola and Vitale gang war. After surviving this war, Catalanotte later assumed the highest leadership position within the Detroit mafia. In addition to his mafia dealings, Catalanotte was also recorded to be a baker and a director of the Detroit Italian bakeries. Catalanotte died from pneumonia and his funeral took place in Detroit.

== Background and family ==
=== Birth, marriage and children ===
Salvatore (Samuel, Sam) Catalanotte was born in Alcamo, Trapani, Sicily on 15 February 1893. It is unclear whether Catalanotte's full name was Salvatore or Samuel as he has Salvatore written on his immigration and Samuel crossed off. However, he was known as Sam "singing in the night" Catalanotte. According to his marriage records he was the son of Mariano and Angelina Catalanotte who lived in Italy. In his immigration records, he reports having black hair and blue eyes and he was 5 foot 3 inches, weighing 142 pounds. When he lived in Detroit, his residence was at 2942 Leland Street, Detroit, later in life, he resided at 303 Rivard Boulevard, Grosse Pointe Park. Sam's occupation on records was a baker. He married Frances (Francesca) Sabitina when he was 26 years old and she was only 17. They married on April 4, 1922. According to his naturalization records in September 1927, Sam and Frances had two children, daughters, Virginia Betsy Catalanotte Palazzolo 1921-2013 and Rose “Rosalia” Barresi 1922–2020. Daughters both buried at Resurrection Cemetery in Clinton Township of Macomb County, Michigan, while mother and father are both buried at: Mount Olivet Cemetery - Detroit, Wayne Michigan.

=== His Brother- Giuseppe (Joe) Catalanotte ===
According to “It Happened in Michigan”, Sam Catalanotte also had a brother named Giuseppe (Joe) Catalanotte who went by Cockeyed Joe, who was a gangster who had been on trial for murder. Joe and Sam did business together and Joe lived for much longer after Sam. Sam had been a major gangster figure in Detroit and after his death, Joe attempted to regain Sam's power. Joseph “Giuseppe / Cockeyed Joe” Catalanotte - BIRTH: 8 Mar 1900 - Alcamo, Provincia di Trapani, Sicilia, Italy - DEATH: unknown / BURIAL: Burial Details Unknown - FindAGrave MEMORIAL ID: 249208243 - Joe was last known to have been deported by the U.S. Federal Government to Cuba, and later from Cuba back to his home town Alcamo, Provincia di Trapani, Sicilia, Italy.

== Immigration ==
Catalanotte spent his childhood in Alcamo, Sicily. During his teenage years, he saw major changes in Alcamo. Between 1901 and 1911, over 32,000 residents emigrated which decreased the population in Alcamo by 37.1%. At the same time, Alcamo was plagued by phylloxera—a bug that infects and destroys grape crops—and two banks went bankrupt, leaving many residents in poor financial standing. Catalanotte decided to join the emigration wave in hopes of better opportunities abroad. He first arrived in America on June 4, 1912 at the age of 19. He took the Ancona ship from the Palermo port, Sicily's capital ~50 km from his hometown. He returned to Sicily within the year, then came back to America for good on April 13, 1913. He settled in Detroit because of the large community of Italian immigrants.

== Criminal career ==
Catalanotte immigrated to Detroit, Michigan, in 1912. He arrived from Palermo with the SS Ancona, landing in Ellis Island the 4 June 1912. Catalanotte was involved in the Giannola brothers gang and survived the Giannola and Vitale gang war from 1918 to 1919. The Giannola gang participated in “rum running”, or illegal liquor business. After this gang war, Catalanotte assumed a leadership position within the Detroit mafia and was generally viewed as an Italian-American community leader. Chester LaMare also worked under Catalanotte in the Detroit mafia. Catalanotte has also been credited with establishing a level of peace between the different gangs of Detroit, lasting through his time as chief leader of the underworld and ended at his death. Catalanotte was initially convicted of carrying concealed weapons without a permit, and when he afterwards applied for and received a permit, he failed to disclose his prior conviction of illegally carrying concealed weapons, which resulted in yet another conviction.

Catalanotte was also a director of Detroit Italian bakeries, which the public assumed much of his wealth came from, and was also a member of the organization Cuello D’Alamo.

== Death ==
On February 14, 1930, Catalanotte died in his home in Grosse Pointe due to complications with pneumonia; a day away from his 36th birthday. His funeral was held on February 17 in the Church of the Most Holy Family. Catalanotte's body was taken from his home to the church in a procession more than a half a mile long. It is estimated to have cost around $20,000 Following the funeral, the body was taken in a procession to Mount Olivet Cemetery in Detroit where Catalanotte was buried. The procession following the funeral consisted of more than 200 cars.

Catalanotte's death led to a vacancy in the leadership structure of the underworld sparking a power struggle between the predominant Mafia gangs in Detroit consisting mainly of the Eastside and Westside mobs. This ended the predominant peace that Catalanotte had maintained during his regime.

== See also ==
- Jack Tocco
- Gaspar Milazzo
- Gaetano Gianolla
- William Tocco
- Joseph Zerilli
