= Gaspar Milazzo =

Italian-American mobster (1887–1930)

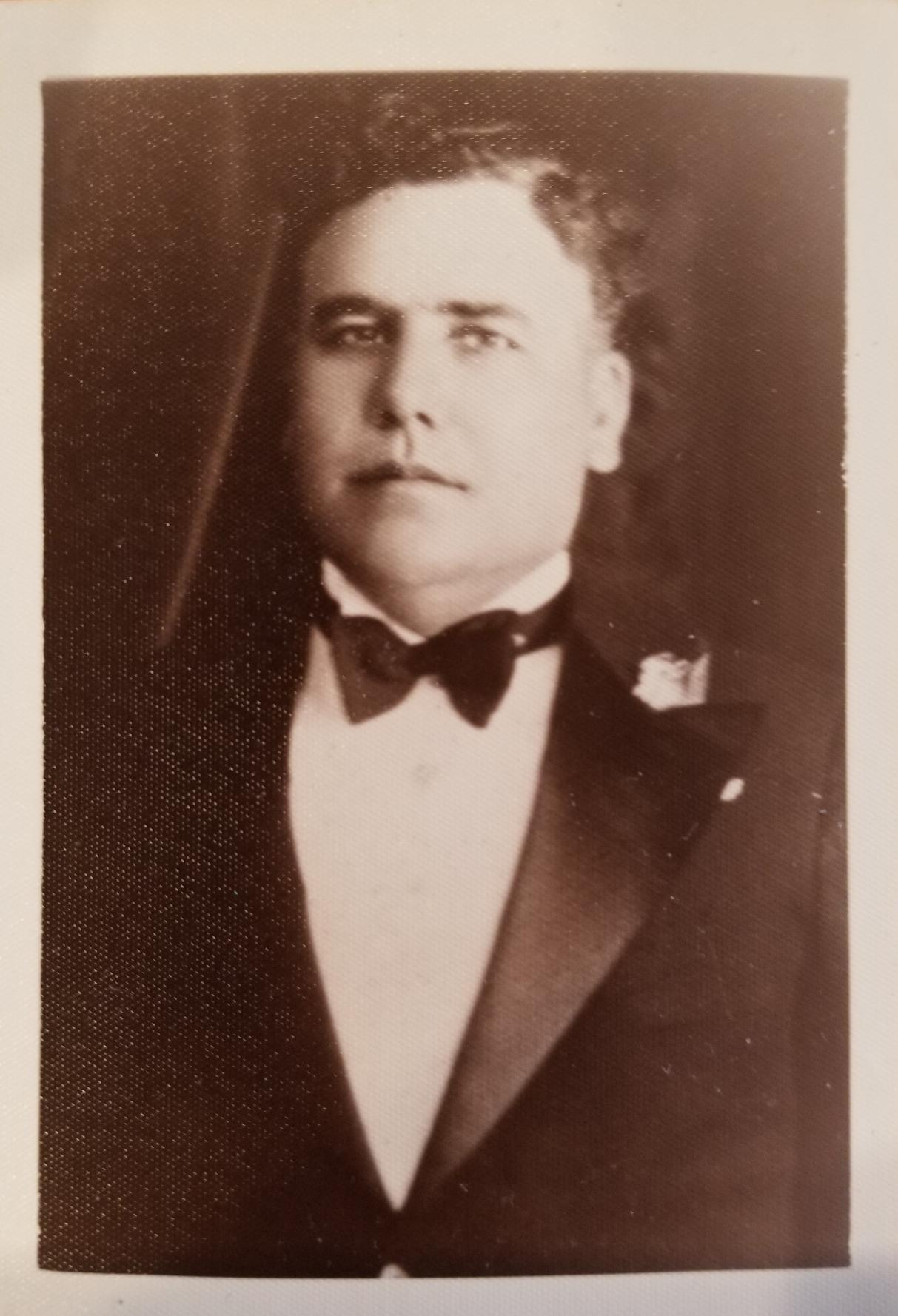
- Milazzo's Wedding Portrait
- Born: April 25, 1887; Castellammare del Golfo, Sicily, Kingdom of Italy
- Died: June 1, 1930 (aged 43); Detroit, Michigan, U.S.
- Cause of death: Murdered
- Other names: Gaspar Scibilia; Gaspar Lombardo; "The Peacemaker"
- Occupation: Crime boss
- Successor: Angelo Meli
- Allegiance: Castellammarese Clan, Detroit Partnership

Gaspar Milazzo (April 25, 1887 – May 31, 1930) was an Italian-American mobster and major organized-crime figure in Detroit, Michigan, during the Prohibition era. He had earlier been a member of the Brooklyn-based gang that would later become known as the Bonanno crime family.

== Early life ==
Born to Vincenzo Milazzo and Camilla Pizzo in Castellammare del Golfo, Sicily, Milazzo immigrated to the U.S. in 1911 and settled in Brooklyn, New York. Upon his arrival, Milazzo quickly established himself within Brooklyn's Sicilian community and the Italian underworld. His criminal record would contain the alias Gaspar Sciblia and Gaspar Lombardo, Sciblia being his wife's maiden name.

Once powerful and now deceased New York Mafia Boss, Joe Bonanno wrote his 1983 autobiography, "A Man of Honor", that "Gaspar Milazzo and his cousin Stefano Magaddino were important men in the Brooklyn-based "Castellammarese Clan".

== Arrival in Detroit ==
Gaspar Milazzo began working with Salvatore Catalanotte and created a close working relationship and alliance with the powerful Mafia leader in the early-to-mid-1920s, there are conflicting reports as to exactly when Milazzo arrived in Detroit, possibly making stops in other cities with Castellammarese Clan influence such as Philadelphia, Pittsburgh and even California where he could look over his criminal and business opportunities in these areas of the country, but by no later than 1923 Milazzo was established in Detroit.

After the death of Catalanotte in February 1930, Milazzo continued to be a high-ranking member of the Detroit crime family, although the actual extent of his power is under debate. Some organized crime writers and authors claim that Milazzo was the successor to Sam Catalanotte, but if that was even true he had a very, very short reign. It is known that Milazzo was a close associate of the East Side Gang led by Angelo Meli, William "Black Bill" Tocco and Joseph "Joe Uno" Zerilli who took over and led the East Side Mob, the remnants of the former Gianolla Gang, Vitale-Bosco Gang and eventually became the first three leaders of the modern Detroit Partnership, otherwise known as the Detroit Combination or the Zerilli crime family. Milazzo also had a close working relationship with the other leading Detroit Mafia factions including the Down River Gang led by brothers Thomas "Yonnie" and Peter Licavoli and their cousins, the brothers Joseph "Joe Misery" and Leo "Lips" Moceri, one of the more formidable Mafia factions within Detroit whose members would become the members of the Detroit Partnership's highest levels. There was the West Side Mob which was the remnants of Sal Catalanotte's faction, Wyandotte-area boss, Joseph "Joe the Beer Baron" Tocco, and the La Mare Gang led by Chester "Big Chet" La Mare of the Hamtramck area.

== Murder ==
The Italian underworld within Detroit had experienced its own power struggles in the mid-to-late 1910s and with the death of top Detroit Mafia Boss, Sal Catalanotte in early 1930, the Detroit Mafia was once again experiencing unrest, rivalry and conflict. The truce and alliance that Catalanotte had created and Milazzo had assisted with for the last few years was now coming unhinged and one of the most volatile conflicts that had already seen some violence was between the East Side and West Side Mobs.

West Side Mob leader Chet La Mare had sent word to East Side Mob leader Angelo Meli that he wanted a sitdown to discuss Mafia affairs and possibly end the feud, but Meli was no fool and he knew that it was not safe to meet with the treacherous La Mare. Meli figured that because Gaspar Milazzo was such a highly respected figure within the Detroit Mafia and known for his mediation skills he could send Milazzo in his place and La Mare would not take it as an insult as he would understand how Milazzo would be seen as the only man who could mediate this dispute so Meli asked Milazzo to go to the meeting in his place and Milazzo accepted. What was not known to Milazzo and Meli was that powerful New York Mafia Boss Joe Masseria had begun to support Chet La Mare in his bid to take over the Detroit Mafia, which was something that would not please Milazzo who was a close associate of Angelo Meli and his two right-hand men, Joe Zerilli and Bill Tocco. It's not known for certain whether or not Milazzo knew about Masseria's support of La Mare. Milazzo accepted Meli's proposal to have him attend the "sit-down" meeting with La Mare as Meli believed that La Mare wouldn't dare kill a Mafia Boss with Milazzo's respect and support knowing it was instantly start a war.

The meeting was set for the Vernor Highway Fish Market in Detroit and on May 31, 1930, Gaspar "The Peacemaker" Milazzo and his right-hand man and driver, Sam "Sasa" Parrino, attended the meeting in place of Angelo Meli and his associates. Milazzo and Parrino were seated and while awaiting La Mare or his representatives they began their lunch. Without comment two gunmen leaped out and unleashed a barrage of shotgun blasts that hit Milazzo in the head and killed him instantly, Parrino was hit in the chest, abdomen and arm and soon died. Gaspar Milazzo died at the age of 43. He left behind his wife, Rosaria, and four children.

== Aftermath ==
The reactions to the murder of Gaspar Milazzo was one of shock and outrage, the men who were closely aligned with Milazzo such as Meli, Tocco and Zerilli called for vengeance and were determined to eliminate La Mare and his associates for such a disgraceful attack on a man who had been a friend to all who knew him, even La Mare whose safety in other Mafia territories outside of Detroit was assured by a Gaspar Milazzo with one phone call on many occasions. Some organized crime historians and writers believe that Milazzo had become the most senior Detroit mafiosi upon Catalanotte's death, but with Milazzo being murdered only 3 months after, there was no time for Milazzo to assume power as he was allegedly supposed to do, or if he could have. Some speculate that Chet La Mare became the top Boss in Detroit, but upon Milazzo's death his closest associates and supporters unleashed a wave of violence upon the La Mare faction and decimated it within a year with over 14 murders. La Mare himself would be betrayed and murdered by his own men less than a year later. While some organized crime historians and crime scholars speculate that Milazzo's murder started the bloody Castellammarese War in New York City between Joe "The Boss" Masseria and Milazzo's associate, Salvatore Maranzano. Others dispute this based on the fact that close Maranzano associate and ally Gaetano "Tommy" Reina was murdered in New York on Masseria's orders three months prior to Milazzo's killing, but it is widely believed or considered to be the first volley within the nationwide Mafia war that lasted from 1930 to 1931 being that Milazzo and Parrino were the first Castellammarese casualties of the war and that it was this huge insult against the Castellammarese that cemented their resolve and motivated them to go to war against Joe the Boss.

In 1999, Milazzo was portrayed by Ralph Santostephano in the television movie Bonanno: A Godfather's Story.

== See also ==
- List of homicides in Michigan
