= Katranis crime family =

Greek American organized crime network

- Founded by: Petros "Pete the Greek" Katranis
- Named after: Katranis family
- Founding location: Detroit, Michigan
- Years active: Mid-20th century–1970s
- Territory: Greektown and the Detroit Metropolitan Area
- Ethnicity: Primarily Greek American
- Leaders: Petros "Pete the Greek" Katranis; Michael Katranis; Gregory "Little Pete" Katranis
- Criminal activities: Bookmaking, illegal gambling, debt collection, loansharking, and extortion
- Allies: Detroit Partnership

The Katranis crime family was a Greek American organized crime network based in Detroit, Michigan, centered primarily within the city's historic Greektown district. Active during the middle of the 20th century, the group operated illegal gambling, bookmaking, debt collection, and related racketeering activities.

The principal figure of the organization was Petros "Pete the Greek" Katranis, who maintained close ties with the broader Detroit organized crime network. Declassified Federal Bureau of Investigation records, regarding the Detroit mob figure Anthony Giacalone, identify Katranis as a collector responsible for gathering tribute from bookmakers in the Detroit and Mount Clemens areas.

While some contemporary accounts refer to the network as a "Greek Mafia," historical evidence indicates it functioned as a specialized Greek American faction operating within the local underworld, rather than as an independent syndicate comparable to traditional Cosa Nostra families. Investigative reporting notes that the Katranis crew operated under the oversight of the Vitale and Giacalone factions of the Detroit Partnership.

== Background ==
=== Greek Americans in Detroit ===
Greek immigrants began arriving in Detroit in significant numbers during the late 19th and early 20th centuries. The Detroit Historical Society records that the city's Greek community had begun developing by the late 19th century, with Greek businesses, including coffeehouses, groceries, restaurants and other commercial establishments, appearing in the early 1900s.

The neighborhood that became known as Greektown had originally been settled by German immigrants during the 19th century. In the early 20th century, Greek immigrants moved into the area and established businesses. By the 1920s, the district had become increasingly commercial, with many Greek residents moving elsewhere while restaurants, coffeehouses and stores remained.

During the 1960s, Greek American community leaders worked to preserve Greektown's cultural identity, as redevelopment threatened the historic district. The first Greek festival was held in 1965, helping establish Greektown as a major commercial and entertainment district.

=== Organized crime in Detroit ===
Detroit developed a large and complex organized-crime environment during the 20th century. Italian American mafias became particularly influential, while criminal operators of Greek, Jewish backgrounds also participated in gambling, bookmaking, extortion, loansharking and other illicit activities.

Historian James A. Buccellato's study of Detroit organized crime describes the development of the city's mafia and its relationships with political, business and criminal networks during the 20th century.

== Notable members ==
=== Petros "Pete the Greek" Katranis ===
Petros Katranis was the principal figure associated with the Katranis organization. Later accounts describe him as the leader of a Greek American group based in Detroit's Greektown and as an associate of the city's Italian American organized crime establishment.

A December 1972 FBI report states that a confidential source described Katranis as a collector, and reported that Katranis was collecting a $200 tribute from each bookmaker in the Detroit and Mount Clemens areas, with organized crime leaders seeking to increase the amount to $500. The same document records a December 13 1972 report that Katranis had been murdered several days earlier. The source characterized the killing as connected to Katranis' activities and his relationship with the Italian mafia.

=== Michael Katranis ===
Michael Katranis was a son of Petros Katranis and was associated with the Katranis network. A contemporary report in the Grosse Pointe News dated June 27 1968, identified him as being among six men arraigned before Judge Paterson on alleged conspiracy charges. The men had been arrested on John Doe warrants. The same report described proceedings involving Vito and Tony Giacalone in connection with weapons charges. The newspaper report provides contemporary evidence that Michael was the subject of an organized-crime-related investigation in the Detroit area.

Later reporting describes him as an enforcer and collector associated with the Detroit Mafia and Greektown. Michael died in July 2015 at the age of 76. His obituary, published by The Detroit News, identifies him as the brother of the late Greg Katranis.

=== Gregory "Little Pete" Katranis ===
Gregory "Little Pete" Katranis was another member of the Katranis family and was associated with gambling activities in Detroit. He became particularly associated with the Clifford Hotel on Clifford Street in Detroit. Historic Detroit describes the hotel as a gambling location, where card games and the dice game barbudi were played.

On May 28 1972, FBI informant George Nicolaou reported that he had been severely beaten inside the hotel. Nicolaou later testified before a federal jury that Christos, Michael and Gregory Katranis had attacked him with fists, a cane and a pistol. The incident became part of a federal criminal investigation. In April 1974, members of the Katranis group were charged with obstruction of a criminal investigation, conspiracy to obstruct a criminal investigation, and firearms offenses in connection with the investigation.

Historic Detroit states that Gregory Katranis was not charged in those proceedings because he had already been found dead in December 1972, with his body placed in the trunk of a cadillac. Later reporting by Scott Burnstein describes Gregory Katranis as a Detroit mob collector and states that he was killed in December 1972. Burnstein gives a different description of the circumstances of the killing, including an account in which Katranis was shot and that his body was subsequently found in a swimming pool.

== Sources ==
- Buccellato, James A. (2015). Early Organized Crime in Detroit: Vice, Corruption and the Rise of the Mafia. The History Press. ISBN 978-1-4671-1754-8.
- "Anthony Giacalone, Part 04". Federal Bureau of Investigation, FBI Vault.
- "Clifford Hotel (Hotel Clifford, Clifford Apartment Hotel)". Historic Detroit.
- "Greektown Historic District". Detroit Historical Society.
- "Proclamation - The Greek-American Family in Michigan". Detroit Historical Society.
- "Grosse Pointe News, June 27, 1968" (PDF). Grosse Pointe Public Library digital collections.
- Burnstein, Scott (September 6, 2017). "Kid Rock Rubbed Elbows With Gangsters, Greek Mobster In His Past, Will Tip-Off Music Bill At Little Caesars Arena Amidst Protests". The Gangster Report.
- Burnstein, Scott (December 6, 2022). "The Little Pete Katranis Hit: Mafia Enforcer In Detroit Killed In December '72, Lost Temper, Then His Hands For Assault On Popular Mobster". The Gangster Report.
- "Michael Katranis obituary". Legacy.com. The Detroit News. July 14, 2015.
