= Holy Sepulchre Cemetery (Southfield, Michigan) =

Cemetery in Oakland County, Michigan

Coordinates: 42.471569°N 83.299630°W

- Interactive map of Holy Sepulchre Cemetery

Details
- Location: Southfield, Michigan
- Type: Roman Catholic cemetery
- Find a Grave: Holy Sepulchre Cemetery

Holy Sepulchre Cemetery in Southfield, Michigan, is an American cemetery operated by Catholic Funeral and Cemetery Services, a ministry of the Roman Catholic Archdiocese of Detroit.

== Notable people ==
Among the notable figures buried there are:

- Larry Aurie, hockey player for the Detroit Red Wings
- Vince Banonis, football player for the Detroit Lions
- Vincent M. Brennan, U.S. Representative from Michigan
- Anthony Giacalone, a Detroit Mafia Member & Suspect in the murder of Jimmy Hoffa
- William Bufalino, Mafia Lawyer and Legal Counsel to Jimmy Hoffa, rumored member of the Mafia
- Angelo Meli, a known member of the Detroit Mafia
- William Tocco, known member of the Detroit Mafia
- Walter Briggs Sr., owner of the Detroit Tigers
- Al Cicotte, baseball player for the Detroit Tigers
- Charles Coughlin, Roman Catholic priest and noted radio commentator during the 1930s and 1940s
- John Francis Dearden, Archbishop of Detroit, 1958–1980, created Cardinal in 1969
- John Dingell Sr., American politician

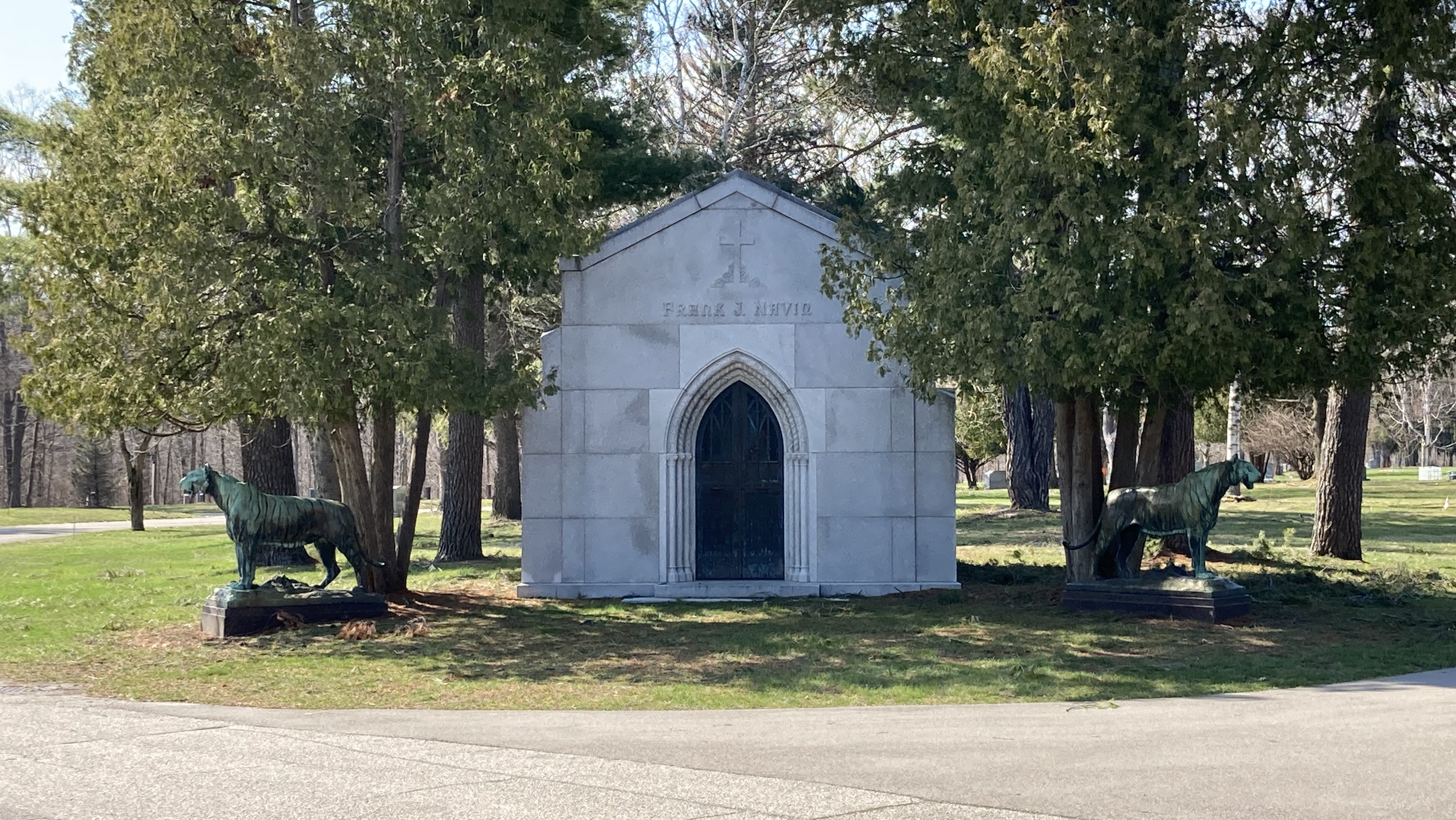
Navin mausoleum, flanked by sculptures of tigers

- Charlie Gehringer, Hall of Fame baseball player for the Detroit Tigers
- Walter Hagen, professional golfer, winner of eleven major championships
- Harry Heilmann, Hall of Fame baseball player for the Detroit Tigers and Cincinnati Reds
- Mike Ilitch, businessman who founded the pizza restaurant chain Little Caesars and was also later the principal owner of the Detroit Red Wings and the Detroit Tigers
- Viola Liuzzo, American civil rights activist and murder victim
- Edward Aloysius Mooney, Archbishop of Detroit, 1937–1958, created Cardinal in 1946
- Francis Joseph Navin, principal owner of the Detroit Tigers from 1908 to 1935
- Dick Radatz, Major League Baseball relief pitcher
- Jay Sebring, murder victim of the Manson Family
- Edmund Szoka, Archbishop of Detroit, 1981–1990, created Cardinal in 1988
- Vic Wertz, 4-time All-Star professional baseball player, he was the batter who hit the ball for Willie Mays' most famous catch
