= Detroit Partnership =

Italian-American organized crime group

The Detroit Rebels
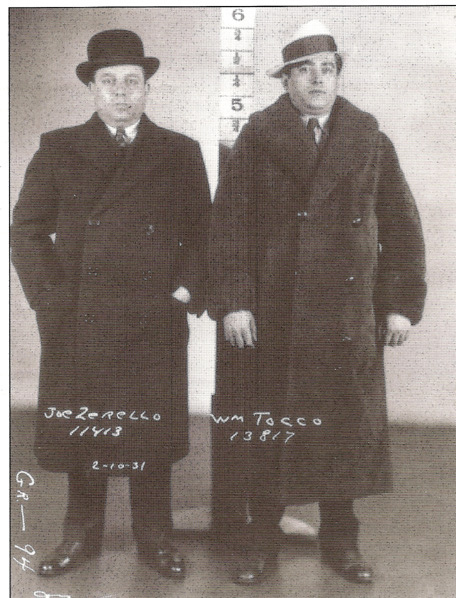
- Joseph Zerilli and William Tocco in 1931
- Founded: c. 1908; 118 years ago
- Founder: Pietro Mirabile
- Named after: Joseph Zerilli
- Founding location: Detroit, Michigan, United States
- Years active: c. 1908–present
- Territory: Primarily the Detroit metropolitan area, with additional territory throughout Michigan, Northwest Ohio and Southwestern Ontario, as well as Las Vegas, San Diego, South Florida, Tucson and Partinico
- Ethnicity: Italians as "made men" and other ethnicities as associates
- Membership (est.): 40–50 made members (2011)
- Activities: Racketeering, gambling, loan-sharking, sports betting, bookmaking, labor racketeering, narcotics trafficking, money laundering, smuggling, bootlegging, fraud, police corruption, prostitution, pornography, assault, and murder
- Allies: Badalamenti Mafia clan; Bufalino crime family; Chicago Outfit; Cleveland crime family; Five Families; Los Angeles crime family; Patriarca crime family; Philadelphia crime family; Pittsburgh crime family; San Francisco crime family; St. Louis crime family; Chaldean mafia; Highwaymen MC; Outlaws MC; Winter Hill Gang
- Rivals: Purple Gang; and various other gangs in the Detroit area

The Detroit Partnership, also known as the Zerilli crime family (Italian pronunciation: [dzeˈrilli]), the Tocco–Zerilli crime family, the Detroit crime family, the Detroit Mafia, or the Detroit Combination, is an Italian American Mafia crime family based in Detroit, Michigan. The family mainly operates throughout the Greater Detroit area, as well as in other locations, including Windsor, Ontario; Toledo, Ohio; and Las Vegas.

Italian organized crime in Detroit originated in Black Hand extortion rings, which preyed upon the southern Italian and Sicilian immigrant communities in the city. After a series of gang wars between various Mafia factions for control of the Italian lottery and extortion rackets during the early 20th century, a period of stability followed under the control of Salvatore Catalanotte. During the Prohibition era, a gang of Detroit mafiosi known as the River Gang smuggled Canadian beer and liquor into the United States from Ontario and controlled most of the bootlegging market in Southeast Michigan. The Detroit Mafia also formed close links with Toledo, a major hub for bootlegged whiskey. Following another period of internecine warfare in the Detroit Mafia known as the Crosstown Mob Wars in 1930 and 1931, the modern Detroit Partnership was formed, led by Angelo Meli, Joseph Zerilli, William "Black Bill" Tocco, John Priziola and Peter Licavoli.

The Partnership consolidated power in the Detroit–Windsor region throughout the 1940s and 1950s. During Zerilli's reign as boss of the crime family, which lasted until his death in 1977, the Partnership maintained substantial influence over Detroit's labor unions, cartage and waste removal industries, and other legitimate businesses. The organization's membership peaked at approximately 100 "made men" in the 1960s. Utilizing its close links with the Sicilian Mafia, the Partnership became a major distributor of heroin in North America after World War II. During the 1960s and 1970s, the Detroit family infiltrated the casino industry in Nevada, "skimming" profits from The Frontier and the Aladdin in Las Vegas, and the Edgewater in Laughlin. Other pivotal operations of the organization included loansharking and illegal gambling, including horse race betting and sports betting, over which it held tight control throughout the Detroit–Pontiac corridor. After decades of avoiding major prosecutions by law enforcement, in part due to its secretive nature, the Partnership was weakened when the organization's leaders were indicted under the RICO Act as part of the Federal Bureau of Investigation (FBI)'s Operation Gametax in 1996. Despite numerous convictions which resulted from the Gametax investigation, the Detroit family continues to operate in the 21st century. As of 2011, the Partnership consists of an estimated 40 or 50 "made" members.

As a result of an edict issued in 1931 by William Tocco and Joseph Zerilli, that members of the organization must marry the daughters, sisters, nieces or cousins of other members, in a measure to ensure loyalty, the Detroit Partnership has been affected significantly less by defections, law enforcement infiltration and infighting than other Mafia families in the United States. Only one "made" member of the Partnership has ever testified against the organization. The crime reporter Scott Burnstein has called the Detroit family "the picture of success, stability, functionality and diversification".

== History ==
=== Early years ===
Three brothers originally from Terrasini, Gaetano Giannola, Antonio "Tony" and Salvatore "Sam", were grocers and fruit peddlers. They first came to the attention of authorities in late 1911 when their grocery store was raided and police confiscated $2,000 worth of stolen olive oil. Weeks later the mutilated corpse of a former Giannola associate, Sam Beundo, was found charred and left in a field. Beundo had allegedly tipped off law enforcement to stolen merchandise found in the basement of the Giannola store. The murder of Beundo established the Giannola brothers as a feared force within the Italian underworld.

==== The Giannola–Adamo war (1912–1913) ====
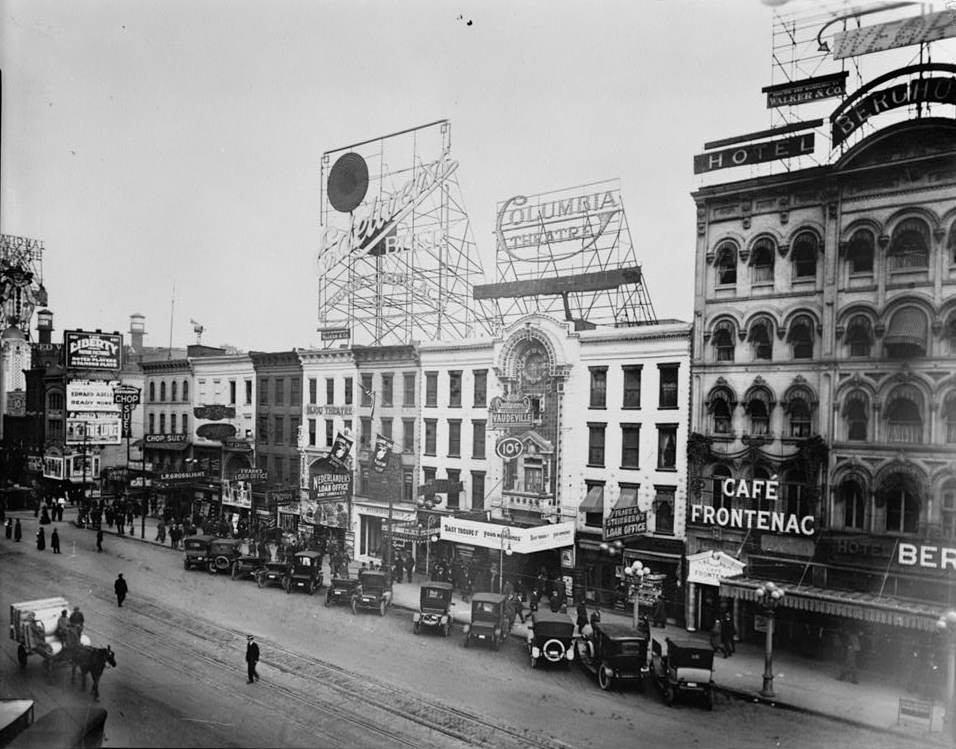
The 00 block on Monroe Avenue, Detroit, 1913

Between 1912 and 1913, the Giannola brothers took over the Wyandotte area rackets gang starting a feud with Wyandotte Mafia boss Vito Adamo. The brothers felt they had secured victory after a series of attacks on the Adamo gang, which left several members dead. Adamo moved to Detroit and aligned himself with Mafia leader Pietro Mirabile, while the Giannolas sought to take over the illicit beer trade. The Adamos were able to fend off the Giannolas' first attempts by giving away free ice with their deliveries. The Adamo gang killed two Giannola gang members, William Catalano and John Jervaso, in April 1913. A string of killings and arrests on both sides followed.

Adamo and two associates were put on trial for the August 1913 murder of Tony Giannola's top aide Carlo Callego. Shortly thereafter an attempt was made on the life of Tony Giannola. In the latter part of 1913, the Giannolas struck indirectly at the Adamos with the elimination of their associate and adviser, Ferdinand Palma, a former Detroit detective turned bank owner and racketeer. In November 1913, both Vito, 34 and Sam Adamo, 32, were gunned down by shooters near their home.

The Giannola gang then became the dominant Italian crime group in Detroit. They controlled the most lucrative rackets within Detroit's Italian underworld. Top members of the gang who would go on to lead the Detroit Mafia and rule the local underworld included John Vitale, Salvatore Catalanotte, Angelo Meli, William Tocco, Joseph Zerilli, Leonardo "Black Leo" Cellura, and Angelo Polizzi. Tony Giannola remained the leader of the gang running operations from the base in Wyandotte. His younger brother Sam secured a reputation as a tough enforcer who led a group of killers, and Gaetano remained the adviser of the group.

==== The Giannola–Vitale war (1918–1919) ====
The Giannola brothers had aligned themselves with mobster John Vitale, who had entered the liquor business with associates Sam Cipriano, Peter Bosco and Joseph Stefano. The Giannola-Vitale alliance and their "liquor combine" were the main competitors to the Adamo brothers. While the Giannolas had fought directly with the Adamos, Vitale and his associates had continued to run the affairs of their liquor business. With the elimination of the Adamo brothers, the Giannola gang's ascension gave Vitale the opportunity to expand his liquor business. Vitale became one of the gang's most trusted and influential lieutenants, along with Cipriano and Bosco. This relationship continued until Bosco was murdered on the orders of Tony Giannola after a disagreement over proceeds from their bakery business. Animosities over the Bosco killing grew and eventually conflict arose between the Giannola brothers and Vitale.

In late 1918, Vitale broke away from the Giannola gang and established himself independently, aligning himself with the remnants of the Bosco group. What became known as the "Giannola-Vitale War" emerged as one of the bloodiest battles in the history of the Detroit Mafia. It left many dead on both sides as they vied for absolute control over Detroit's Italian underworld. Several of Detroit's future Mafia leaders became top Giannola gunmen during this time, including Giuseppe Manzello, Angelo Meli, Bill Tocco, Joe Zerilli, Leo Cellura and Angelo Polizzi.

The Vitale gang struck the first major blow to their rivals when Tony Giannola was murdered in January 1919. His brother Sam took over as the new leader of the gang. The Vitale gang made an attempt on his life in February 1919. Sam escaped unharmed, but his brother-in-law Pasquale D'Anna was killed. Sam Giannola ordered a surprise attack on the Vitale forces in retaliation. He ordered his gunmen to shower the Vitale headquarters with bullets precisely when D'Anna was being laid to rest during his funeral. No one was killed, but Vitale mistakenly shot and wounded one of the police officers who responded to the shooting and was arrested.

Three weeks later, Sam Gianola was arraigned on auto theft charges. The next day, he led a team of shooters into the Wayne County jail house in response to the killings of Tony and Pasquale, opening fire on three Vitale gang members. Joe Vitale and Salvatore Evola were each shot once and survived. Vito Renda was hit 21 times but lived just long enough to break the Mafia code of Omertà and reveal to authorities that Sam Giannola was one of the shooters. Giannola was arrested and charged with Renda's murder. During the murder trial months later, it took the jury 50 minutes to find him not guilty.

Two of Sam Giannola's sons died in a house fire in July 1919, and later that summer a sit-down was called so that representatives of the two factions could seek a peaceful solution. Detroit underworld legend claims that an agreeable arrangement was achieved and that a "peace pact" was drawn and written in blood by the two feuding Mafia chieftains. Some understanding was reached regarding the liquor rackets and the other criminal activities. However, with the passing of the Volstead Act in October 1919, new motivation for the mobsters presented itself.

With the advent of Prohibition, tens of millions of dollars in illicit profits were at stake in control of the new liquor import and bootlegging trade. In early October 1919, weeks before the passing of the Volstead Act, Sam Giannola was hit by a barrage of bullets originating from a car parked in front of a bank. Giannola was hit 28 times, staggered back into the bank, collapsed and died. John Vitale, the prime suspect in the murder, was meeting with his attorney at the time of the incident discussing the strategy for his upcoming trial.

With the death of Giannola, his gang split into two independent factions, both still opposed to John Vitale.

==== John Vitale's reign ====
At the start of 1920, Vitale had emerged as the top Mafia boss in Detroit. Although the Giannola gang had fractured, two dominant figures within the Giannola organization emerged to take control of splinter factions of young mafiosi. Giuseppe Manzello, a Giannola gang gunman whose youth and ambition attracted younger members of the gang, rose to some prominence at the age of 20. Manzello's rise was met with opposition by the Renda/Mirabile family, who were the last remaining resistance within the old Giannola gang to the younger, more liberal members. The Renda/Mirabile family were more conservative and had more in common with Vitale and his faction.

On August 10, 1920, while Joe Manzello stood curbside talking to his close associates Angelo Meli, 23 and Angelo Polizzi, 21, a car sped by and showered the three men with bullets. Manzello was hit by eight bullets, Polizzi by seven. Meli escaped injury but Manzello and Polizzi were rushed to hospital. Polizzi eventually recovered; Manzello died days after the shooting as a result of his injuries. Manzello's followers demanded revenge on John Vitale who they felt had ordered the shooting.

Salvatore Catalanotte, known to his friends as "Singing Sam", was a Gianola gang lieutenant by the time he was 20. At the time of the Gianola-Vitale war, Catalanotte was the president of Detroit's Unione Siciliana. He became leader of a splinter group within the gang after the murder of his bosses. Catalanotte was a protégé of Gaetano Giannola. Catalanotte formed a strong alliance with Wyandotte area beer baron, Joseph Tocco and Hamtramck Mafia leader Chester La Mare. This faction became known as the Westside Mob.

The remaining Manzella group members were opposed to the Vitale leadership and on August 11, 1920, the group retaliated and struck back at Vitale by murdering Antonio Badalamenti, a leading Vitale gang member and the boss's nephew. The attack on Badalamenti in front of his grocery store was allegedly led by Joe Zerilli, the roommate and close associate of Manzella and Polizzi. Along with Zerilli, six other Manzella group members were arrested, including Zerilli's cousin Bill Tocco, Manzella's cousin Carlo Manzella, Leo Cellura, John Mangone, Vito Paraino, Joseph Delmonico and James Barraco. All the charges were dropped against them two days later.

The elimination of Joe Manzella left Sam Catalanotte as the dominant member of the old Giannola gang and as a sign of friendship he appointed Angelo Meli the leader of the Manzella group. Bill Tocco and Joe Zerilli were named as Meli's right-hand men. Meli reorganized the group under the "Eastside Mob" flag.

On August 18, 1920, police believed that several of those freed from being charged in the Badalamenti murder participated in the murder of Joe Vitale, the 17-year-old son of John Vitale. The killing may have been accidental with the true target was the senior Vitale, as gunmen directed a volley of bullets towards Vitale, his son and wife while they were leaving their home. Vitale was struck by 18 bullets fired from two moving cars at 3:00 am on September 28, 1920. No one was ever charged with his murder. The death of Vitale marked the end in the series of feuds. Relative peace reigned following his death and the ascension of Sam Catalanotte as the head of Detroit's Sicilian Mafia.

Catalanotte organized the remaining Mafia factions under a liquor combine that became known as the "Pascuzzi Combine". The combine was a liquor smuggling and bootlegging syndicate that gave each group and its leaders their own specific territory to operate, while working together for the overall expansion of Detroit Mafia power and influence. The Pascuzzi Combine created a unified and cohesive criminal organization that controlled liquor smuggling, bootlegging, gambling, prostitution, narcotics and other rackets and was the forerunner of the Detroit Partnership under the future Zerilli-Tocco regime.

=== Prohibition era ===
Throughout the Prohibition era, from 1920 to 1933, the Detroit River was utilized to facilitate the flow of illegal liquor from Canada to Detroit. The bootleggers who did this were referred to as rum runners. These bootleggers also owned the majority of the speed boats in the river. Detroit had a dedicated fleet of patrol boats to prevent the transportation of liquor across the border. However, this system was ineffective because federal officers were caught taking bribes. Towards the end of Prohibition, the gangs began upgrading to larger boats able to manage heavy seas and carry more liquor, and added larger motors to enable higher workload and maintain their schedule. Detroit continued to add more of a police presence, but the rum runners were able to go around the checkpoints.

In the late 1920s, following the Eighteenth Amendment to the United States Constitution, the Detroit Partnership capitalized on new transportation mediums in order to conduct their illicit activities. They were aided by Detroit's proximity to the Canadian border and neighboring city of Windsor, Ontario, with the province not having a ban on the production and exportation of alcohol.

Until the late 1920s, goods and civilians crossed the Detroit-Windsor border via ferry, as there was no bridge. The automotive industry within Detroit encouraged immigrants from Canada to seek work in the United States, which in turn invited bootleggers to shuffle their illicit goods through large crowds of immigrants. Initial plans and blueprints to build the Ambassador Bridge and Detroit-Windsor Tunnel found public support as Detroiters became upset with the apparent lack of infrastructure. By the time the Bridge and Tunnel were built in 1929 and 1930, respectively, the liquor trade was under the purview of the state and provincial governments. The city of Windsor and Detroit-Tunnel were consequently nicknamed "Windsor the Wicked" and "Detroit-Windsor Funnel" due to a negative reputation from illegal liquor trading.

==== Boss "Singing Sam" Catalanotte (1921–1930) ====
The Detroit Mafia as a unified organization can be traced to the early 20th century "Motor City" mafiosi who came together to begin what was known by the early 1930s as the Detroit crime family or Detroit Partnership. Gaspar Milazzo was born in 1887 in Castellammare del Golfo, Sicily. Milazzo, known as "The Peacemaker", and Stefano Magaddino, known as "The Undertaker", were two of the earliest Castellammarese Clan leaders to settle in the Brooklyn area. Their crew faced opposition from Buccellato clan who had also settled there and were involved within the Italian underworld. Continued violence between the two groups caused Milazzo and Magaddino to flee New York City in 1921 after they were sought for questioning in connection with the murder of a Buccellato clan member. Magaddino fled to Buffalo, New York, and Milazzo to Detroit, where both used their high level positions within the "Castellammarese Mafia" to organize their own crime families. The relocation of Milazzo and Magaddino and their establishment of powerful East coast Mafia families played a role in the eventual unification of the American Mafia, known to its members as La Cosa Nostra or "This Thing of Ours".

Milazzo established himself as a powerful mobster within the Detroit underworld. Detroit had a large Sicilian immigrant population and was one of the East Coast's bootlegging hubs. At the time of Milazzo's arrival the Jewish Purple Gang controlled much of the liquor trafficking in the area. Milazzo became recognized as a Mafia adviser and mediator of disputes as many of the areas mafiosi sought his council and leadership. Milazzo aligned himself with Salvatore Catalanotte, known as "Singing Sam", the local head of the Unione Siciliana. Milazzo and Catalanotte aligned the city's Mafia factions into a loosely organized and cohesive unit that controlled bootlegging, gambling, narcotics, prostitution, and other rackets within the city and surrounding areas.

Catalanotte had brokered an uneasy peace under the "Pascuzzi Combine" around 1920. Milazzo assisted Catalanotte with the continued unification and leadership and after Catalanotte's death in February 1930, Milazzo continued to oversee the peace between the local Mafia factions. Milazzo was then recognized as the senior Mafia leader in the area and the boss of the local Mafia for a short time. Milazzo was a close associate of the East Side Gang, led by Angelo Meli, William Tocco and Joseph Zerilli. Milazzo's Mafia group and the Eastside Gang maintained alliances with other mob factions, including the River Gang, led by brothers Thomas and Peter Licavoli who shared the local bootlegging rackets and various underworld activities with each other.

==== The Crosstown Mafia War (1930–1931) ====
Milazzo had been recognized as one of the Detroit Mafia's top bosses since the early 1920s and relative stability had reigned within the local underworld throughout this time, but by 1930 continuing Mafia rivalries based in New York and Chicago concerning his Castellammarese allies directly involved Milazzo. At the heart of the volatile situation within New York City's Mafia lay Milazzo's fellow Castellammarese mafiosi who found themselves being opposed by powerful boss Giuseppe "Joe the Boss" Masseria. The ongoing feud had reached a boiling point and supporters on both sides in New York, as well as Chicago were preparing for war.

Gaspar Milazzo and his longtime ally, Buffalo Mafia boss Stefano Magaddino had secretly, but willingly supported their allies in New York and Chicago as they opposed Joe Masseria and his supporters. By 1930, both men openly supported their allies, including Chicago Mafia boss Giuseppe Aiello, who was being opposed by a powerful Masseria ally in Chicago, Al Capone. Joe Masseria, the recognized "boss of bosses", was incensed by the disrespect Milazzo and Magaddino where showing him by supporting his enemies and soon Masseria decided Milazzo and Magaddino, both powerful and influential mafiosi, must be eliminated.

Masseria accomplished this in Detroit by supporting a Milazzo adversary, Cesare "Chester" William LaMare, the now head of the Westside Mob, sometimes referred to as the Catalanotte Gang in Detroit. LaMare was born in Ripacandida, Italy on January 6, 1887, to two parents of Italian descent. LaMare later established himself as a naturalized U.S. citizen and in 1917, proclaimed his occupation to be a self-employed fruit merchant in Detroit. LaMare's parents were allegedly of Castellammarese descent and some Mafia historians claim he was a close associate of Milazzo. In the early 1920s, LaMare established a base of operations in Hamtramck. He opened a popular night club known as the Venice Cafe. With his business partners and the leaders of the Eastside Gang, Angelo Meli, William Vito "Black Bill" Tocco, and Joseph "Joe Uno" Zerilli, LaMare grew rich and powerful, shaking down brothels and gambling houses for protection and muscling into bootlegging rackets. Hamtramck became so corrupt that in the fall of 1923, Michigan Governor Alex Groesbeck ordered detachments of the Michigan State Police into Hamtramck to take control of the city government. This operation resulted in the arrest and eventual conviction of 31 men, including Hamtramck Mayor Peter C. Jezewski, for Prohibition law violations. LaMare was sentenced to a year in federal prison, but the judge increased his original fines and gave him probation on LaMare's promise to "go straight".

In early February 1930, Sam Catalanotte died from pneumonia. The situation was exactly what LaMare had been waiting for. LaMare had previously been the principal lieutenant of Sam Giannola and believed he should have been elevated to Catalanotte's position of supreme boss by the end of the Giannola-Vitale War.

Following the death of Sam Catalanotte and with the support of Joe Masseria in New York, LaMare began to make plans to eliminate the leaders of the Eastside gang which included Angelo Meli, William Tocco and Joseph Zerilli. LaMare's Westside gang consisted of mostly members from the old Sam Catalanotte gang, a downriver gang headed by William Tocco's brother, Joseph Tocco, and Benny Vitagliano (Benny the Baker). There had been an ongoing rivalry between the Eastside and Westside gangs formed as LaMare forced his way into the Eastside gang's rackets. LaMare's aggressive ventures into the Eastside gang had almost brought about open warfare in the Detroit Italian underworld. LaMare used the potential warfare as an excuse to set up an assassination attempt disguised as a peace meeting. LaMare scheduled a meeting between the two divisions of Detroit at a Vernor Highway fish market, where he planned for three gunman to assassinate Eastside mob bosses.

The Fish Market Murders developed into the major gang conflict between the Eastside and Westside Mobs, which would later be known as the Crosstown Mafia War. Meli immediately swore to avenge the deaths of his two representatives. Between May 31 and July 23, 1930, at least 14 men were murdered by gangland guns.

The killings stopped abruptly with the murder of WNBC radio commentator Gerald Buckley on July 23, who was shot in the lobby of the LaSalle Hotel on the same night that the vote to recall Detroit Mayor Charles Bowles took place.

In response to the killing, The Detroit police enacted severe measures to restrict undesirable and illegal crime, as they tried to find persons of interest after Buckley's murder. The Detroit Police put a grand jury into place immediately to investigate the crimes that were happening. Most mob leaders went into hiding, while gangs maintained a much lower profile as the war continued. The police and the Eastside Mob were looking everywhere for Meli. Police speculated that Meli told Joe Amico and the other assassins from the fish market that they needed to put their boss, LaMare, "on the spot", soon or they would end up dead. On February 6, 1931, LaMare arrived at his home with his bodyguard, Joe Girardi. LaMare asked his wife to drive Girardi home. Two men, later identified by fingerprints as Joe Amico and Elmer Macklin, entered the house and shot LaMare twice in the side of his head. Chester was found dead in the kitchen several hours later by his wife.

LaMare's death successfully ended the Crosstown Mafia War in 1931. Amico and Macklin were later tried and acquitted for the murder of LaMare. Leaders of the Eastside Mob became the originators of what was to become Detroit's modern-day Mafia organization.

=== Establishment of the Detroit Partnership ===
==== Castellammarese War ====
After the death of Gaspar Milazzo a war ignited within the Detroit Mafia and at the same time the Castellammarese War in New York had officially begun. During this time in Detroit Chester La Mare, with the support of powerful New York boss Joe Masseria was recognized as the new Detroit Mafia boss.

La Mare went into hiding while more than a dozen Mafia members were killed in Detroit during the Eastside gang/Westside gang war that lasted roughly a year. In February 1931, La Mare was having a meal with his bodyguards, Joe Amico and Elmer Macklin, when he was murdered. While Amico spoke to La Mare, Macklin rose to wash some dishes and subsequently shot his boss in the back. Both Amico and Macklin had a murky history with their previous operations, being described as "not too well trusted even by the gangland [they] served." La Mare's wife was not present at the time of the murder, as she was driving one of her husband's associates back to his home in Detroit. Some theorized that Mrs. La Mare was informed of or even involved in her husband's murder, given the unique circumstances of her absence that night. Eventually, these rumors dissipated. Betrayed by his own men in his home, La Mare and his authority were swiftly put to an end. The death of La Mare in early 1931 and other Mafia leaders later on, such as Joe Tocco, led to the remaining Detroit Mafia leaders uniting under one group and leadership: that of the reigning Eastside gang leaders, Angelo Meli, "Black" Bill Tocco and Joe Uno Zerilli.

Alongside Meli, Tocco and Zerilli were their allies John Priziola and Peter Licavoli who become part of the Detroit Partnership's "Ruling Council", the crime family's top leadership committee. This was basically the formation of the Detroit crime family or Detroit Partnership as it became known within the American underworld. At the same time Detroit's Mafia factions were in opposition of each other once more throughout 1931, the Castellammarese War raged on within New York's Italian underworld, pitting the city's two most powerful, old world Sicilian bosses and their supporters against each other.

The assassination of New York Mafia "boss of bosses", Joe Masseria on April 15, 1931, effectively ended the large scale Mafia war based in New York. The next round of events in New York's Italian underworld would influence not only Detroit's underworld future, but basically that of the American underworld. Soon after the death of Joe Masseria his main rival and successor, Salvatore Maranzano was murdered on September 10, 1931, by a rising faction of young Mafia leaders within the New York Mafia. These young, modern Mafia leaders had helped Maranzano eliminate Masseria, but all the while they were biding their time and planning their eventual take over of the New York underworld and consolidation of the Italian underworld nationwide.

The death of New York's two old world-style Mafia leaders, Masseria and Maranzano signaled and solidified the rise of a young, modern Mafia leader, Charles "Lucky" Luciano and his supporters known as the "young turks". Under the leadership of Luciano and the allied leaders within New York's Five Families came the establishment of The Commission, the ruling committee of the American Mafia. Under the New York Mafia's new regime, which included bosses Charlie Lucky Luciano, Joseph "Joe Bananas" Bonanno, Vince Mangano, Thomas Gagliano and Joseph Profaci, the Detroit Partnership was officially recognized within the Italian-American underworld's new organizational structure. The powerful mid-west crime family became one of the 24 original Mafia crime families that comprised La Cosa Nostra in America and began its dominance within the Michigan underworld.

=== Zerilli era (1936–1977) ===
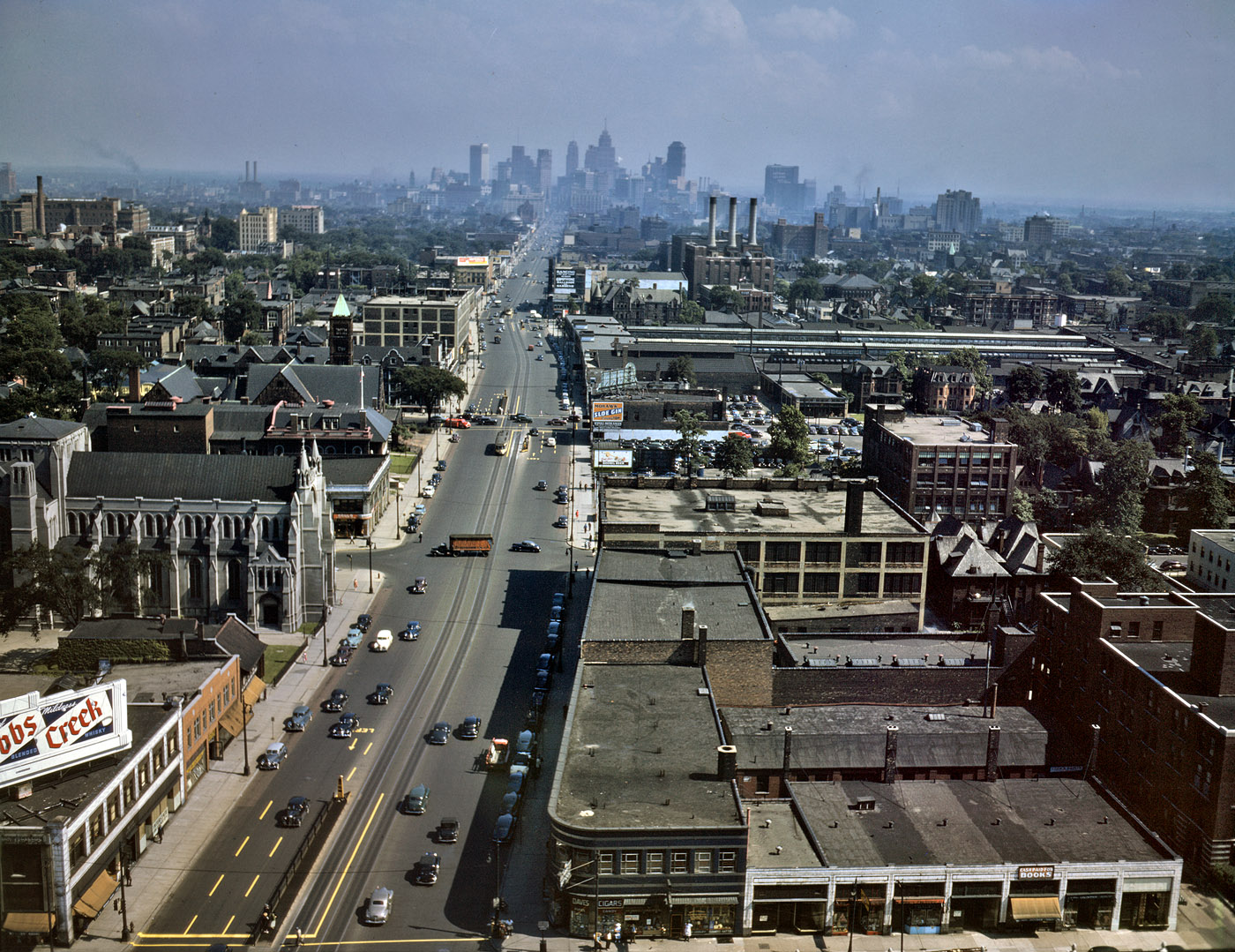
Woodward Ave, Detroit, 1942. Photograph by Arthur Siegel.

The first official or "sitting boss" of the Detroit Partnership was William Tocco, born Guglielmo Vito Tocco in Terrasina, Sicily, in 1897 and known as "Black Bill" Tocco. Tocco had been one of the top leaders of the Eastside gang, along with Joseph Zerilli and Angelo Meli who became underboss and consigliere to Tocco. Tocco's reign as the supreme ruler of the Detroit Mafia lasted roughly five years as he was indicted on tax evasion charges in March 1936. Even though the financial portion of the case was settled in 1937 Tocco stepped down as boss soon after his indictment due to the publicity, something that early, traditional American Mafia bosses shunned.

Tocco was convicted and sentenced to eight years in prison and was replaced by his trusted underboss and brother-in-law, Joseph Zerilli, who then headed the Ruling Panel' of the Detroit Partnership. Some Detroit underworld historians and mob watchers believe that Black Bill Tocco served as the number two man or underboss for his brother-in-law Joe Zerilli from the time of his imprisonment until his semi-retirement in the mid-1960s.

Upon his release from prison in the mid-1940s, Tocco moved to Florida, but without question maintained a great deal of power within the Detroit underworld and his influential status within the Detroit Partnership. While living in semi-retirement in Miami, Bill Tocco remained a senior adviser to boss Joe Zerilli and his fellow mafiosi in Detroit and was considered a respected Mafia leader by his peers across the country until his death of natural causes on May 28, 1972, at the age of 75.

After a 1956 Commission meeting, the crime families of Philadelphia, headed by Angelo Bruno, and Detroit, headed by Zerilli, were added to The Commission. As a commission member Zerilli acted as a senior L.C.N. leader alongside the five New York City bosses and other top Mafia bosses from around the country at the time that included Stefano Magaddino of Buffalo, Sam Giancana of Chicago, Angelo Bruno of Philadelphia, Santo Trafficante Jr. of Tampa, Carlos Marcello of New Orleans and Raymond Patriarca Sr. of New England. Joe Zerilli remained the top boss of the Detroit Mafia until his death of natural causes on October 30, 1977, at the age of 79.

Anthony Joseph Zerilli had taken over as acting boss of the Detroit Partnership around 1970 when the elder Zerilli went into semi-retirement, but it was short-lived, as "the old man", as he was known to his peers in his later years, was called out of retirement until his death to lead the crime family he helped build over the better part of five decades due to the untimely imprisonment of his son and successor in 1974.

With the imprisonment of the younger Zerilli and one of his closest associates, Michael Santo Polizzi, known as "Big Mike" because they had concealed their ownership of the Frontier Hotel and Casino in Las Vegas, the old man was basically forced out of retirement to lead the crime family at the highest levels once more until a suitable successor could be chosen.

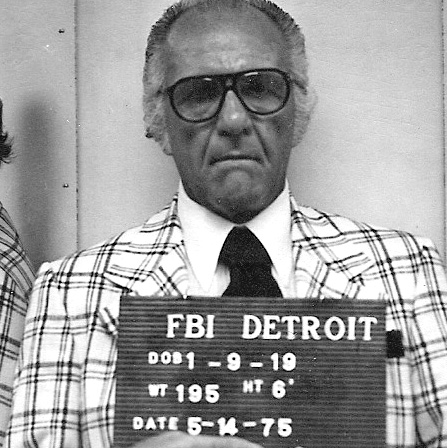
FBI mugshot of Anthony "Tony Jack" Giacalone in 1975

Anthony Giacalone gained national fame in the 1970s with the disappearance of Jimmy Hoffa. Prior to then, there had been growing tension between Hoffa and several Mafia members, who opposed his plans to return to prominence in the International Brotherhood of Teamsters. The latter included Giacalone, Anthony Provenzano and Giacalone's brother Vito. On July 30, 1975, Hoffa disappeared after he had gone out to a restaurant to meet Provenzano and Giacalone. Giacalone had not been near the restaurant that afternoon, though he was suspected of being involved in a conspiracy to murder Hoffa. Giacalone was later jailed for 10 years in 1976 for income tax fraud at FCI, Oxford, Wisconsin.

==== Gotham Hotel ====
From its construction in 1924 until the early 1940s, the hotel was named the Hotel Martinique. However, not enough hotels catered to the black community during this time. In 1943 John White, Walter Norwood, and Irving Roane purchased the hotel with the hopes of making it an oasis for the black community in Detroit. The Gotham Hotel became the most renowned hotel for black people in Detroit and regularly hosted popular celebrities and athletes, such as Langston Hughes and Jackie Robinson.

The hotel's clientele included black businessmen, gamblers, and mafia affiliated cronies including Anthony Giacalone and Pete Licavoli. Giacalone was a Detroit mafia gambling boss who teamed up with Licavoli to manage the gambling/illegal rackets at the hotel.

In 1962, a gambling racket run inside the building formerly occupied by the Gotham Hotel was raided by the Michigan State Police, aided by the IRS and local authorities. Security at the hotel was tightly controlled by the use of a "building-wide buzzer alarm system" and an extensive camera system that linked to a television in the lobby. All authorities involved handled the case with complete secrecy when investigating the hotel, and at 5:00 pm on November 9, 1962, 112 officers, led by Anthony Getto of the IRS’ intelligence division, raided the hotel. Upon trying to use the elevators, they found that the power to them was cut, and officers had to use the stairs to reach all nine stories and 250 rooms of the hotel. On the top floor, a crooked dice game was found with $5,000 on the table. On the other nine floors, bet slips, adding machines, counting machines, guns, ammunition, and at least 30 safes were found. The next day, the safes were cracked to find a grand total of $49,200 in the safes alone. The raid amounted to 160,000 bet slips, $60,000 in cash, and 33 adding machines.

Forty one arrests were made in the raid. Nine people were held in federal custody and arraigned the next day on charges for not having a gambling stamp and evading taxes. Also in federal custody were John White, Earle Cuzzens, Benjamin Ormsby, Curtis Lewis, James Cummings, James Gholston, Nick Richardson, Delores Stone, and Dorothy Grier. Those caught playing dice on the tenth floor were placed under investigation for violating Michigan gambling laws. White and Cuzzens were released on $10,000 bond. The other individuals found in the dice game were tried on charges for gambling or conspiracy.

The raid on the Gotham hotel meant that a gambling location could no longer presume immunity in Detroit. Many operators moved their gambling operations outside of the city, while operators that stayed were continually on the move. This made policing easier because there were more opportunities to observe them and catch their mistakes. The phone numbers of Giacalone and Licavoli appeared in the personal phone directory of White confiscated during the raid, evidence, the police used to confirm the longstanding belief that operators at the Gotham were connected to the Detroit Syndicate.

==== The American Lebanese Club ====
The American Lebanese Club was a mafia-run gambling establishment fronted as a "social fellowship" organization. The American Lebanese Club eventually became the Lower East Side of Detroit Club, abbreviated to Lesod Club. Members of the Lesod Club played Barbut, a dice game of Middle Eastern origin. The Lesod Club, operated by Anthony and Vito Giacolone, moved locations a number of times throughout its existence due to police-generated pressure. Police had regular surveillance on the Lesod club and raided it many times, attempting to uncover the illegal gambling that was carefully hidden under the facade of a social club, until its closure in 1962.

The American-Lebanese Club was first raided by police in 1942 for gambling suspicions. From 1942 until early 1959, it was raided 18 times and 275 people were arrested, yet none of them had been charged. Police were unable to bring about a court case due to insufficient evidence—that is until Asab Jordan went to the police after amassing a $5,000 debt gambling at the club.

After this event, the police set up a 24-hour surveillance sting operation in October 1959 to track which members were visiting the club. They installed lights in the area and took pictures of various members to arrest in the future. There were reports that members were so fed up with the surveillance that they started taking pictures of the police officers that were watching the club.

On December 29, 1959, the police made their largest raid on the club, arresting 28 members, later bringing 11 members to trial. The police suspected that Vito Giacolone, an underboss of the Partnership, and Michael Thomas ran the gambling operations of the club, which could bring in $10,000 in a typical weekend. Asab Jordan was the star witness in the case, but police almost lost his testimony when he failed at attempting suicide, which he says was unrelated to the case, but more so related to pressures to pay his debts.

Over the following months, others were arrested in relation to the gambling charges, with individuals being identified by the pictures the police took over several months. The people arrested after the raid were never charged, while the 11 people awaiting trial pleaded guilty and were facing two years in prison. Ultimately, the 11 members were assessed fines ranging from $100-$300, with Vito Giacolone receiving the highest fine of $300.

After the constant surveillance and resulting court cases, the American-Lebanese Club stopped operating and became the Lower East Side of Detroit (LESOD) Club.

==== The Lower East Side of Detroit (LESOD) Club ====
When the American-Lebanese Club was shut down in 1959, the Lesod Club, originally Lower East Side of Detroit Club, took its place at 106 W Columbia St. and later moved to River Rouge. The Lesod club was much like the American-Lebanese Club. Registered as a men's social club, the Lesod club ran an illegal barbudi game that could rake in $30,000 in one night. The club was run by two mafiosi, Vito and Anthony Giacalone. Adding onto the security measures put in place when it was the American-Lebanese Club, the Giacalone brothers developed extremely cautious systems to protect the club against police.

The game was played upstairs behind a locked door with a peephole. The outside was guarded who screened people before they were allowed to enter through the locked door downstairs. On one occasion Billy Giacalone and his henchmen, Otis Tincer, who were both involved in security, let police upstairs to look around; all they found after hearing people rushing around upstairs was men playing checkers.

Eventually, the police filed a petition for abatement of a nuisance and they subpoenaed everyone who entered the club in the nights that followed. All of the witnesses pleaded the fifth amendment, but the police already had enough evidence for a search warrant. Before the search warrant could be exercised, the Lesod Club closed and did not try to reopen in the city of Detroit. Despite not reopening in the city, Vito attempted several times to move the gambling operation to the suburbs.

=== Tocco era (1977–1996) ===
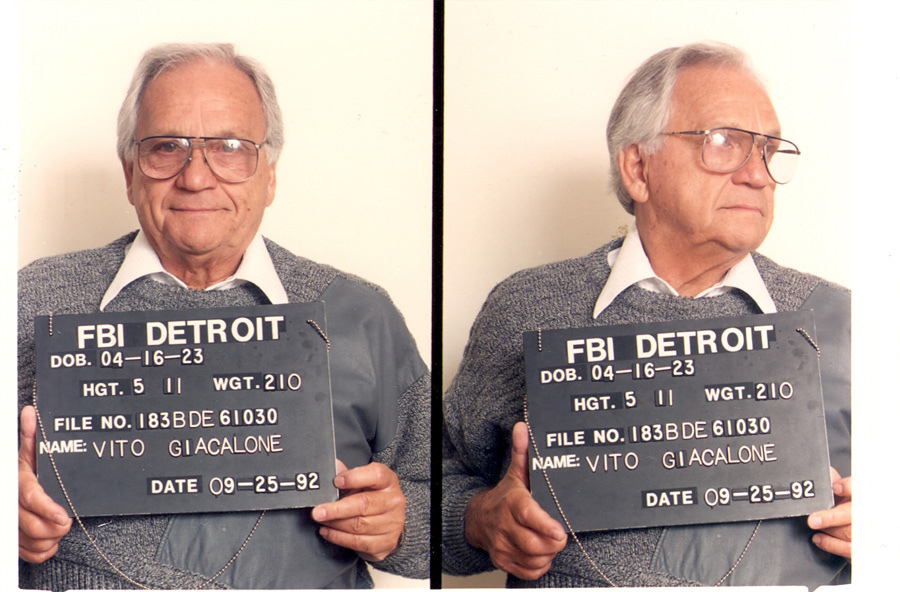
FBI mugshot of Vito "Billy Jack" Giacalone in 1992

Upon his death in 1977, Joe Zerilli was succeeded as boss by the most senior member of the Ruling Council, John Priziola, known affectionately to his peers as "Papa John". Born Giovanni Priziola, the longtime Detroit Mafia leader was one of only two charter ruling council members left alive and active at the time of Zerilli's death. The other senior ruling council member was former Down River Gang leader and Prohibition era czar, Peter Licavoli, who by this time was himself semi-retired and living in Tucson, Arizona, not far from his friend, retired Mafia boss Joe Bonanno.

Licavoli was characterized as a powerful Detroit Partnership member who had been the crime family's Toledo, Ohio, operations overseer and people say he held a great deal of influence over Detroit area gambling operations, along with many other personal business interests.

Pete Licavoli ran his business affairs from his Arizona ranch which he then sold to Estes Homes for development in 1980. He died of natural causes on January 11, 1984, at the age of 81, the last of the original ruling council members. With the death of boss Joe Zerilli, John Priziola as the Detroit Partnership's most senior leader effectively became the top boss of the crime family. Only Peter Licavoli held the same status and a similar level of authority as a charter ruling council member. Priziola had been a longtime Detroit Mafia leader who was greatly respected throughout the Detroit Mafia, but much of his power came from being the leader of a powerful and wealthy faction within the Detroit Partnership.

The "Partinico faction" was a group of Detroit Mafia leaders that included Raffaele Quasarano and deported Sicilian-American mafiosi, Francesco "Frankie Fingers" Coppola. These men, along with associates in San Diego, California, and Windsor, Ontario, ran the crime family's heroin importation operations. Through their influential underworld connections nationwide they amassed a great deal of wealth and power over the years with the help of their narcotics contacts in Sicily.

Priziola was a traditional, old world mafioso who ran his affairs and those of the crime family from the shadows, so to run the day-to-day operations he officially named Joe Zerilli's nephew and Bill Tocco's son, Giacomo "Jack" Tocco as the acting boss of the crime family. Papa John acted as the crime family's official consigliere, but due to his senior position and the great deal of power and influence Priziola carried throughout the Detroit Partnership his word was final. The long criminal career of Papa John Priziola within Detroit's underworld was influential, but his time as the top boss in Detroit was short-lived, as he died of natural causes at the age of 84 on April 14, 1979, less than two years after his predecessor, Joe Zerilli.

Joe Zerilli had demoted his son and chosen successor Tony as acting boss after he was convicted in the early 1970s and allegedly before his death Zerilli gave his blessing and encouraged his supporters to name his nephew and protégé, Jack Tocco as his eventual successor to the throne of the Detroit crime family. Jack Tocco's intelligence and abilities as a leader were known within the Detroit underworld during the time the young Tocco made his way through the ranks of the Detroit Partnership in the 1950s and 60s. The fact that Tocco basically held a "mafia pedigree" and was considered "mafia royalty" as the son of Black Bill Tocco worked greatly to his advantage and he was eventually named the new sitting boss of the Detroit crime family soon after the death of Papa John Priziola.

According to law enforcement sources Jack Tocco allegedly became the official boss of the Detroit Partnership on June 11, 1979, in a ceremony held at the Timberland Game Ranch in Dexter Township. Apparently as a sign of appreciation for the support his father gave him and to show that they were united as a family Jack Tocco named his cousin Tony Zerilli his official underboss immediately after he was released from prison in 1979 after serving over four years of his prison sentence.

According to law enforcement, Mafia historians, and true crime authors, the Tocco-Zerilli regime still maintains its leadership within the Detroit Mafia, known in local underworld and law enforcement circles to this day as the "Partnership" and the "Combination".

=== The Partnership since 1996 ===
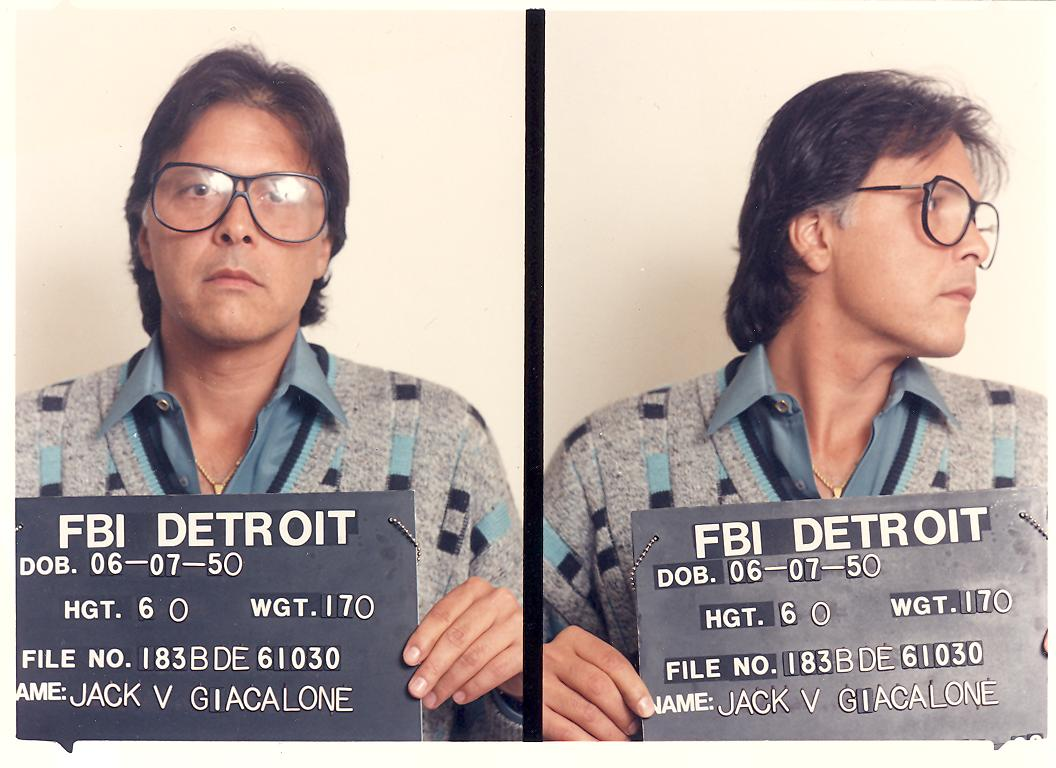
FBI mugshot of Jackie Giacalone

The Partnership was hit by indictments in March 1996 against 17 members and associates. Among those indicted were boss Jack Tocco and underboss Anthony Joseph Zerilli. Four alleged capos were also indicted. One was Anthony Joseph Corrado, who was identified in 1974 by the Nevada Gaming Commission as one of a few individuals from Detroit who received "lavish" treatment while vacationing at the Las Vegas casinos.

Anthony Joseph Tocco was another reputed capo. He was among 30 Detroit men placed on the record of the Senate Labor-Management Rackets Committee by Robert F. Kennedy who claimed that Tocco either was a delegate to a crime convention in Apalachin, New York, or among "their contacts and associates." Vito William Giacalone is a reputed capo along with his brother Anthony.

The Detroit Partnership has been able to remain stable entering the 21st century, but the organization has been diminished greatly in numbers. It was believed to have around 50-70 made men as of 2010, but at the same time the organization has proven itself to be a very stable and resilient crime family considering what most other Cosa Nostra families deal with in the way of internal strife and law enforcement scrutiny. The Detroit Partnership has remained stable and is still considered a top criminal organization within the state of Michigan. Most of their members are related by blood or marriage, making it hard for outsiders, including law enforcement, to gain information on them. This has led to few people becoming informants against the Partnership and has made building a criminal investigation against them difficult.

On June 19, 2001, 34-year old John Jarjosa Jr. was shot and killed in Southfield, Michigan, on 8 Mile Road. Detroit mob associate 31-year old Gerard "Jerry the Blade" Bianchette was murdered at a Macomb County construction site by a shotgun blast on August 10, 2002. Bianchette was considered a protégé of Anthony Joseph Zerilli and his murder is believed to be stemmed from a drug-deal that Bianchette felt Louis "Butch" Stramaglia owed him money from.

In March 2006, 15 alleged members and associates of the Partnership were indicted on RICO charges relating to bookmaking, money laundering and extortion following an FBI investigation which began in 1998. According to the indictment, Peter Tocco and Jack Giacalone headed two related criminal enterprises in the Detroit area that laundered money, concealed ownership of illegal proceeds and participated in illegal interstate travel in aid of racketeering. In March 2007, Tocco, along with Peter Joseph Messina, Thomas James Mackey, John William Manettas and Wayne Joseph Kassab, pleaded guilty to racketeering charges.

A large number of associates oversee gambling, loansharking, extortion, narcotics and labor racketeering operations, along with many legitimate businesses. Jack Tocco, having been semi-retired for years, died of natural causes in 2014. Jackie Giacalone, who had been groomed to take over for years, became boss before Tocco's death. Joseph Mirabile took over as underboss, but peacefully succeeded the position to Anthony La Piana upon Giacalone's ascension to boss. Giacalone was allegedly made in 1986.

As of 2011, it is believed that membership in the Detroit Partnership stands at around 50 made members.

Partnership street boss and consigliere Peter "Specs" Tocco died on June 19, 2024.

== Historical leadership ==
=== Boss (official and acting) ===
- 1890s–1913 – Pietro Mirabile – stepped down, later fled Detroit in 1914.
- 1913 — Vito Adamo — murdered on November 24, 1913.
- 1913–1919 — Antonio "Tony" Gianola — murdered on January 3, 1919.
- 1919 — Salvatore "Sam" Gianola — murdered on October 2, 1919.
- 1919–1920 — Giovanni "John" Vitale — murdered on September 28, 1920.
- 1921–1930 — Salvatore "Singing Sam" Catalanotte — died on February 14, 1930.
- 1930 — Gaspar "The Peacemaker" Milazzo — murdered on June 1, 1930.
- 1930–1931 — Cesare Lamare — murdered on February 7, 1931.
- 1931–1936 — Guglielmo "Black Bill" Tocco — stepped down in March 1936, becoming underboss.
- 1936–1977 — Joseph "The Old Man" Zerilli
  - Acting 1970–1974 — Anthony "Tony Z." Zerilli — imprisoned in 1974.
  - Acting 1974–1977 — Giacomo "Jack" Tocco
- 1977–1979 — Giovanni "Papa John" Priziola
- 1979–2014 — Giacomo "Jack" Tocco — semi-retired in 2014, and died on July 14, 2014.
  - Acting 1998–2002 — Tony Tocco
- 2014–present — Jack "Jackie the Kid" Giacalone

=== Street boss (front boss) ===
- 1950s-2001 — Anthony "Tony Jack" Giacalone – died in 2001
- 2002–2014 — Jack "Jackie The Kid" Giacalone — became boss in 2014.
- 2014–2024 — Peter "Blackie/Specs" Tocco – died on June 19, 2024
- 2024–present – Giuseppe D'Anna

=== Underboss (official and acting) ===
- 1936–1963 — Guglielmo "Black Bill" Tocco
- 1963–1972 — Peter Licavoli — imprisoned in 1972.
- 1972–1977 — Peter "Bozzi" Vitale — stepped down in 1977.
- 1977–2008 — Anthony "Tony Z." Zerilli — demoted, then shelved
  - Acting 2002–2008 — Vito "Billy Jack" Giacalone
- 2008–2014 — Joseph "Joe Hooks" Mirabile — retired in 2014, died 2019.
- 2014–present — Anthony "Chicago Tony" LaPiana

=== Consigliere ===
- 1931–1969 — Angelo Meli
- 1969–1977 — Giovanni "Papa John" Priziola — became boss in 1977
- 1977–1981 — Raffael "Jimmy Q." Quasarano — imprisoned in 1981
- 1981–1993 — Michael Santo "Big Mike" Polizzi
- 1993–2008 — Anthony "Tony T." Tocco
- 2008–2014 — Dominic "Uncle Dom" Bommarito — retired in 2014
- 2014–2019 — Anthony "Tony Pal" Palazzolo — died January 2019
- 2019–2024 — Peter "Specs" Tocco – died on June 19, 2024

== Current members ==
=== Administration ===
- Boss — Jack "Jackie the Kid" Giacalone — In 2013, Giacalone's daughter went into a coma due to a severe peanut allergy. His family has provided her with 24 hour care. The family would later receive a $29 million jury verdict payment from the hospital for negligence.
- Underboss — Anthony "Chicago Tony" LaPiana — LaPiana was initially an associate in the Elmwood Park crew of the Chicago Outfit, where he was a protégé of John DiFronzo. He relocated to Detroit in the early 1970s and married the daughter of Partnership capo Vincent Meli in 1974. LaPiana was inducted into the Partnership alongside Jack Giacalone in February 1986 and headed the crime family's white-collar faction. He succeeded Meli as crew capo and was made acting underboss around 2012 before being promoted into the position officially in spring 2014.
- Consigliere – Eugene "Gene" Baratta — captain; son-in-law of Anthony Zerilli. Baratta previously served as acting consigliere.

=== Caporegimes ===
- David "Davey the Doughnut" Aceto — capo; In March 2006, Aceto was one of 15 people arrested for racketeering conspiracy related to a multimillion-dollar sports bookmaking ring. He pleaded guilty and was released from prison on April 6, 2010.
- Giuseppe "Joe the Hood" D'Anna — capo; In 2003, D'Anna and his younger brother Girolamo, also a Detroit mobster, were indicted and charged with one count of conspiracy and two counts of attempted extortion for an incident involving a restaurant owner in Shelby Township. D'Anna was made capo around 2014 by Giacomo Tocco. In October 2016, D'Anna was sentenced to 16 months in federal prison after pleading guilty to a 2011 incident in which he beat up a rival restaurant owner with a baseball bat and threatened to kill him. He was released from prison on February 21, 2018.
- Joseph "Joey Jack" Giacalone — capo.

=== Soldiers ===
- Vincenzo "Vinnie Meatballs" Bronzino – Bronzino was among 15 people indicted on federal racketeering charges in March 2006.
- Anthony "Nino" Corrado Jr
- Dominic "Chicago Dom" Corrado
- Paul "Big Paulie" Corrado — possible acting capo. He is the son of former Detroit mobster Anthony Corrado.
- Paul "Cousin Paulie" Corrado – cousin of Paul "Big Paulie" Corrado
- Peter Anthony Corrado
- Peter Jack Corrado
- Girolamo "Mimmo" D'Anna
- Vincent Giacalone
- Antonino "Anthony" Vitale - suspected of drug trafficking with connections in South America and money laundering. Suspect in two unsolved homicides. Connected to a prominent restaurant group.
- Patrick Rugiero – convicted in 1992 for drug trafficking, brother to Anthony
- Anthony Rugiero – acquitted in 1992 for drug trafficking, brother to Patrick
- John "Johnny Bananas" Sciarrotta (born in March 1955) – current soldier. Sciarrotta's family hailed from Calabria. According to the information by Nove Tocco, a Detroit family soldier turned witness, Sciarrotta's father was a bookmaker and associate of the Detroit family, before dying in December 2018. By the mid-1970s, Sciarrotta served as a business agent for Teamsters Local 299. In 1974, Sciarrotta was arrested for larceny, and in 1975 and 1976, he was arrested for obstruction of justice. In February 1977, Sciarrotta was arrested for embezzlement along with Richard Fitzsimmons, the son of Jimmy Hoffa successor and the President of the International Brotherhood of Teamsters, Frank Fitzsimmons, Sciarrotta was acquitted in April 1978. By the 1980s, Sciarrotta was responsible for collecting gambling debts on behalf of Henry Allen Hilf, an associate in the crew headed by Detroit family capo, Vito "Billy Jack" Giacalone. In around 1990 or 1991, Sciarrotta assisted Nove Tocco and Paul "Big Paulie" Corrado in several extortion schemes which targeted gamblers, bookmakers and numbers lottery operators, and by April 1991, Sciarrotta along with Tocco and Corrado, were extorting various numbers business operators. In November 1991, Sciarrotta was involved in the beating of George Wierzba, along with Tocco, Corrado and Dominic Rubino, Wierzba ended up paying over $14,000. It is also believed that Sciarrotta was involved in the extortion of John Jarjosa, whom paid over $40,000 from between 1992 and 1995. By the mid-1990s, Sciarrotta became involved in a heroin distribution ring. In December 1995, Sciarrotta pled guilty to weapons charges, and in January 1996, he was found guilty of conspiracy, Sciarrotta was released from prison in 2000. By the late 2010s, Sciarrotta was believed to have been the partner of David Miranda within a cocaine distribution ring. In March 2019, Sciarrotta was under investigation by the DEA, FBI and the Michigan State Police, Sciarrotta was surveilled conducting a cocaine deal with an accomplice to an undercover law enforcement agent, Sciarrotta was arrested at a gas station in Canton Township the same day he was surveilled. Sciarrotta's home in Dearborn, Michigan, was raided and cocaine among with 3 handguns were found at his residence. In late 2019, Sciarrotta was sentenced to 10 years in prison and his release date is December 2030.
- Louis "Butch" Stramaglia – suspect in Bianchette murder
- Anthony Tocco Jr.
- Joseph N. Tocco
- Peter "Peter Gotti" Tocco – Salvatore Tocco's son. Alleged driver for boss Jack Giacalone
- Peter "Little Pete" Tocco – son of deceased consigliere/street boss Pete Tocco
- Salvatore Tocco

=== Associates ===
- Antonio Ciraulo (born on January 12, 1951) — current associate. Ciraulo was born in Italy and his family hailed from Palermo. The Ciraulo family immigrated to the United States from between 1966 or 1967. By the early 1970s, Ciraulo resided in James Township, Saginaw County in Michigan, and by 1975, the Ciraulo family lived in Detroit located on 14227 Eastwood Street, around this time, it is believed Ciraulo was associated with the Detroit family through his association with Vito "Billy Jack" Giacalone, and Ciraulo was placed into the crew as an associate during the early 1980s which was headed by Giacalone whom was elevated to the position of capo. Ciraulo was first arrested in October 1984 during a gambling raid by the Detroit Police Department. In January 1985, Ciraulo was arrested for conspiracy and illegal gambling however he had avoided conviction. In April 1988, it was ruled by the Michigan Court of Appeals that Ciraulo was permitted to possess a handgun for self-protection reasons despite operating an illegal gambling den in Sterling Heights. According to information by prosecution witness, Nove Tocco, Ciraulo was involved in distributing heroin and cocaine on behalf of the Giacalone crew. In October 1991, Ciraulo was implicated in the murders of Dennis Graziani and Thomas Gambini, shooting them in the head, at the Casino Express Agency in Clinton Township, Ciraulo was also accused of stabbing a third man, Matthew Edmunds, however he had managed to escape the Casino Express, he was held without bail at the Macomb County Jail and pleaded not guilty to murder and armed robbery. In September 1992, Ciraulo was convicted of weapon charges, assault and robbery, he had declined the plea deal which would of commuted him to a sentence of 10 years in prison, and instead in October 1992, he was sentenced to life imprisonment. By the 2020s, he had served stints at the Michigan Reformatory, the Thumb Correctional Facility and the Lakeland Correctional Facility in Michigan.
- Gino Accettola — associate. Accettola was convicted of fraud sixteen times between 1991 and 2019. He served his first prison sentence during the 1990s. In August 2018, Accelotta was sentenced to seven years in state prison for embezzling around $200,000 from Interlink Payment Systems, a Clinton Township credit-card processing company. In August 2022, he was sentenced to eleven years in federal prison for defrauding seventeen people of over $4 million in an investment fraud scheme.
- Vito Parisi — associate. Parisi is a former associate of Nove Tocco and brother-in-law of former capo Frank "The Bomb" Bommarito . Parisi was arrested in 2013 for marijuana manufacturing.

== Former members ==
- Francesco "Frankie Bomb" Bommarito (born on November 14, 1929) — former soldier. Bommarito was born in Michigan, and his family hailed from Palermo and Trapani. Bommarito was arrested four times, in 1948, 1957, 1961 and 1968 for armed robbery, burglary, fraud and illegal gambling. By the early 1960s, Bommarito was a close associate of Vito William "Billy Jack" Giacalone. In around August 1975, Rosalise Yearego had informed the FBI that Bommarito had worked with Jackie Giacalone at the fruit market located on 23411 Greater Mack, St. Clair Shores prior to the sale of the fruit market and was now employed at a bar on Warren Avenue. In December 1983, Bommarito had met Charles Acker, an undercover informant for the FBI, at Denny's in Detroit, regarding an attempt to murder Ernest Kanakis, as Kanakis had murdered Nicolo Ditta, Joseph Siragusa and Frank Randazzo in July 1976, and by March 1984, it was agreed $7000 would be given for murdering Kanakis, later in the end of the month March in 1984, Bommarito was indicted for conspiracy to murder and was released on $50,000 bond, in 1985, Bommarito was convicted and he served 3 years in prison. By the early 1990s, Bommarito became the acting capo for Billy Giacalone, in around this time, Bommarito became the liaison from between the Detroit family and the Outlaws motorcycle club, in particular, he had meet with Harry "Taco" Bowman on several occasions, the Outlaws MC International President. In 1991, Bommarito married Linda Parisi. He died in October 2016.
- Emanuel "Rough Manuel" Badalamenti — former consigliere. Badalamenti oversaw a rum-running ring which operated from Wayne County, Michigan to Toledo, Ohio during the 1930s. In 1939, he and six other members of the bootlegging ring were imprisoned for income tax evasion and conspiracy to violate liquor laws. Badalamenti was released from the Federal Correctional Institution, Milan on August 13, 1942. He later founded the Vending Machine Co. of Monroe and operated the Star Market in Monroe until he retired in 1967. Badalamenti died on April 16, 1973, at the age of 70.
- Vincent "Little Vince" Meli — former capo. Meli was the son of Frank "the Music Man" Meli, nephew of Angelo Meli, and father-in-law of Anthony LaPiana. He was an Army Special Forces veteran of World War II, and graduated with a business degree from the University of Notre Dame. Meli was a labor racketeer. He died of bone cancer on January 7, 2008, aged 87.
- Raffaele "Jimmy Q" Quasarano — former consigliere. Quarasano was a drug trafficker and reputed "hit man" whose headquarters was based at Motor City Barber Supply in Roseville. Along with Peter Vitale, he also owned Central Sanitation in Hamtramck, where Teamsters president Jimmy Hoffa was allegedly incinerated in 1975. In 1980, Quarasano was convicted with Vitale of racketeering and tax offenses involving the extortionate takeover of a Wisconsin cheese company, and sentenced to four years in prison. Quarasano died on October 22, 2001, at the age of 90.
- Peter Dominic "Specs" Tocco — former street boss and consigliere. Tocco died on June 19, 2024.

== Former associates ==
- Francesco "Chinkie" Versaci (born on February 17, 1926) — former associate. Versaci was born in Michigan, and his family hailed from Calabria. During the 1940s, Versaci served in the American Navy. By the 1960s, Versaci was associated with Detroit family capo, Jack W. Tocco. By the 1970s, Versaci was heavily involved in illegal gambling. By the 1980s, Versaci may have had been assigned to Detroit family capo, Anthony J. Tocco, and were seen together by FBI surveillance in October 1981 at The Nugget restaurant located on 14620 East Eight Mile Road, Sam Bagnasco and Joe Mirabile also attended the meeting, and according from information by Nove Tocco, Versaci and Jack Tocco were partners in the bookmaking business around about this time. In October 1984, Versaci was living at St. Clair Shores in Macomb County. In 1985, Versaci operated the Frank’s Meat Market located on 15 Mile and Kelly Road in Clinton Township. In January 1993, Versaci was noted to have contributed a $5000 donation to the Children’s Hospital of Michigan Auxiliary. He died in January 2012.
- Petros "Pete the Greek" Katranis — former associate. Katrinis headed a faction of Greek-American Partnership associates based in Detroit's Greektown. He was the father of Michael and Gregory Katrinis.
- Ronald Richard Morelli (born on September 1, 1938) — former associate. Morelli was born in Detroit and his family hailed from Lazio. Morelli became an associate of the Detroit family in the late 1950s, through Anthony Giacalone. In February 1963, Morelli was employed at the Gold Cup Coffee Company. By August 1963, Morelli became associated with Anthony Corrado and often met together at social clubs, including at the East Warren Recreation and the French Leave bar. In December 1963, Morelli became in debt to Billy Giacalone for $500. By April 1964, Morelli was involved and operating barbuit and crap games on Monroe Street in Detroit with Billy Giacalone. According to the FBI in November 1967, Morelli was a money collector for Giacalone for his loanshark operations. In June 1968, Morelli was arrested for extortion and conspiracy, and pled not guilty in September 1968, he was acquitted in December 1969. By December 1970, Morelli was heavily involved in prostitution and illegal gambling, and was active in Ohio and Michigan. In June 1971, Morelli was indicted for illegal gambling and extortion, with Bob LaPuma and Saul "Sol" Shindel, in December 1971, Shindel was accused of stealing money from Giacalone's operations and went on a gambling spree in Las Vegas, and Shindel was murdered during that same month, Morelli and LaPuma were identified as suspects in the murder. According to author, Scott Burnstein, Morelli became an acting capo on behalf of the Anthony Giacalone crew during the early 1970s, however witness, Nove Tocco, identified him as an associate. Morelli was a suspect in the December 1972 murder of Gregory "Little Pete" Katranis. In January 1975, Morelli pled guilty to illegal gambling and was sentenced to 1 year in prison. Upon release, Morelli became involved in fixed card games, loansharking and other illegal gambling operations with LaPuma and the Giacalone crew, around this time, Morelli was associated with Paul Leggio, Daniel Triglia and Jack Vito Giacalone. In March 1976, Morelli was suspected of his participation in the murder of Frederick "Tommy" Labarrie Jr. In March 1977, Morelli was indicted for illegal gambling, along with Antonino "Tony" Ruggirello, Peter Victor Cavataio and Henry Allen Hilf. In May 1977, Morelli was indicted for racketeering, prostitution and illegal gambling, with Detroit police officer, Ronald Jones, and was acquitted in April 1977, Robert Henry Kohner, a home burglar, was shot and killed, it is believed Kohner was killed as he was set to testify against Morelli in May 1977. In December 1978, after Morelli was found guilty of wire fraud and conspiracy, he was sentenced to 15 years in prison, he was released on $100,000 bail. He died in August 1985 while incarcerated at FCI Milan.

== Government informants and witnesses ==
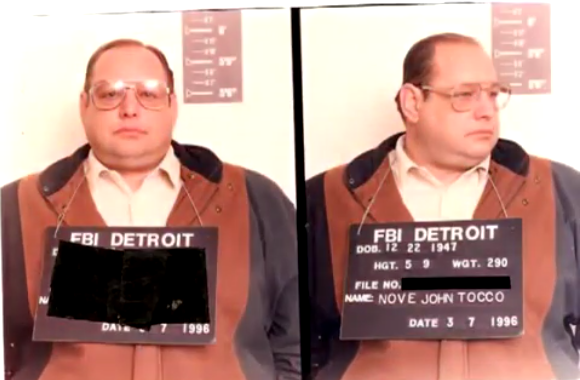
FBI mugshot of Nove Tocco in 1996

- Nove Tocco — former soldier. Tocco is a grandson of Joseph Zerilli, nephew of Anthony Zerilli, and cousin of Jack Tocco. He was convicted in a cocaine conspiracy in 1986 and served five years in federal prison. In 1992, Tocco was involved in a conspiracy to kill the biker boss Harry "Taco" Bowman. He became the first "made" member of the Partnership to cooperate. During the late 1990s, Tocco was convicted of several offenses so he testified against Jack Tocco in 2000 to receive a lighter sentence. He is currently in the witness protection program.
- Silverio Joseph Vitello (born on October 6, 1928) — former soldier. Vitello's family hailed from Campania and Lazio. By the early 1950s, Vitelli was associated with the Detroit family and heavily involved in the numbers lottery business as a runner. In February 1954, Vitello married Anna Calisi in the Bronx, New York. By the late 1950s, Vitello operated the Sal’s Pizzeria in Greektown. By the 1960s, Vitello had resided in St. Clair Shores, Macomb County. In January 1964, Vitello was arrested for obstruction of justice. By the late 1960s, Vitello, James "Jack" Russo and Joseph D. Cusmano, managed to secure a dominant position within the steel hauling industry, at Capitol Cartage from between 1965 and 1974, Vitello had also started his own business called S&V Cartage which was engaged in the trucking industry. In 1975, Vitello, Bily Giacalone and Jackie Giacalone were partnered with Jax Warehouse, a steel storage facility in Detroit, and by 1976, the trio were involved in J&S Brokerage. By April 1979, Vitello had a home in Michigan and in Ohio, and was heavily involved in the carting industry, associated with Billy Giacalone. According to information by Vitello, he had been involved in delivering tribute money from other Detroit family associates to Billy Giacalone, and admitted that he personally "kicked up" $1000 to Giacalone each week and gave him between $15,000 and $35,000 at Christmas. In March 1981, Vitello was arrested for conspiracy and mail fraud, and was convicted in November 1981, he was fined twice to the amount of $10,000 and $25,000, respectively, and was later sentenced to probation in November 1984. By the early to mid-1980s, Vitello operated the Transport Carriers Inc. and the Detroit-Toledo Express. In 1990, Vitello had hoped to open a new nightclub on Secor Road in Toledo with the initial name of Club Mafia, however he was forced to change the name by Anthony Zerilli and the club was later named Club Copa Cabana. In June 1991, Vitello was arrested for larceny as he was accused of stealing golf clubs and other items from a vehicle on 3300 Secor Road in Toledo. In November 1993, the FBI officially identified Vitello as a soldier for the Detroit family. In 1996, Vitello, along with members from the Detroit and Cleveland family were involved in a narcotics trafficking operation. In January 1998, Vitello was arrested for the purchase of narcotics and was released on $500,000 bail. In March 1998, Vitello agreed to cooperate and pled guilty to weapons charges, and he was acquitted of drug conspiracy. He died in May 2001.

== List of murders committed by the Detroit Partnership ==
Name	Date	Reason
Frank "The Undertaker" Bagnasco	September 21-22, 1937	46-year old Bagnasco was shot and killed after he had feuded with the administration of the Detroit family.
Joe "The Baron" Tocco	May 3, 1938	Tocco was born in Terrasini, Sicily. Tocco was a member of the West Side gang from Detroit and took control of the gang following the murder of Cesare "Chester" LaMare. By 1915, he had been arrested at least 11 times for crimes such as murder, arson, bootlegging and income tax evasion. Tocco had operated the Kitty Kat Beer Garden located at 635 South Bayside Avenue. Tocco died at the Wyandotte General Hospital as he had succumbed from 6 gunshot wounds the previous night. Tocco may have been murdered for a feud with Anthony "Tony Cars" D’Anna or he may have been killed in order to cement a new East-West alliance in the Detroit underworld.
Eddie Sarkesian	August 16, 1944	Sarkesian was born in Lebanon. Sarkesian was killed for robbing Mafia-operated gambling parlors.
Lydia Thompson	October 13, 1945	Thompson was killed by an axe and knife, or an icepick, and she may had implicated Santo "Cockeyed Sam" Perrone in her murder with a note on her desk mentioning Perrone.
Gus Andromulous	1947	Andromulous was strangled by wire by Giacomo "Black Jack" Tocco and Anthony "Tony Z" Zerilli as part of their initiation to become members of the Detroit family.
Eddie Martino	1949	Martino was a soldier for the Detroit family and served as a bookmaker. Martino was found shot multiple times and killed in Oakland County, Michigan.
Jack George	February 1, 1950	George was strangled and shot to death by Dominic "Fats" Corrado, as part of his initiation to become a soldier in the Detroit family, as George fell in disfavor of the Detroit family administration for robbing possibly associates and members of the family.
Salvatore "Toto" Vitale	1956	Vitale had served as a soldier for the Detroit family and killed after a feud with Giovanni "Papa John" Priziola and Raffaele "Jimmy Q" Quasarano. Vitale was last seen enroute to a meeting with Jack Tocco and Anthony "Tony T" Tocco at a bar in Windsor, Canada.
Leonardo "Leo" Difatta	August 19, 1957	38-year old Difatta was killed for the stick-up of several policy houses belonging to the Corrado crew.
Earl Atwood	August/September, 1957	Atwood was found in a gravel pit in Waterford Township, Michigan, shot in the head. It is believed Atwood was killed for owing a substantial amount of money to the Detroit family due to his gambling addiction.
Salvatore DiMaggio	March 28, 1968	DiMaggio was beaten to death on orders of Tony Giacalone by Peter Vassallo, John Palmer and Robert Dunaway, who had instructed the men to warn DiMaggio without killing him, as DiMaggio owed Giacalone a large sum of money for missing high interest payments from his gambling addiction.
Pete Klavinger Jr.	February 3, 1971	It is believed Klavinger was murdered by the Detroit family for acquiring debt to loansharks affiliated with the Detroit Mob.
Sol "Good Looking Solly" Shindel	December 6, 1971	Shindel was beaten with a fireplace poker and shot in the face at his home located on 15659 Pennsylvania Street in Southfield, Michigan. It is believed Shindel was possibly murdered as he was under indictment and for other accusations such as that he was skimming profits for himself from the rackets and that he had acquired a substantial money debt. Robert "Bobby the Animal" La Puma and Ronald "Hollywood Ronnie" Morelli, whom both had worked directly for Shindel, was suspected by law enforcement as the perpetrators.
Agnes Brush	February 27, 1972	Brush was stabbed to death in her office in Detroit. Brush was employed by a company that gave loans to a mob-connected development firm, and was killed after complaining about the shady financial transaction used to finance the famed Pine Knob Music Theatre, now called GTE Music Theatre, suburban Detroit.
Gregory "Little Pete" Katranis	December, 1972	Katranis was found dead in the trunk of a Cadillac vehicle, with a bullet in his head and his hands chopped off. It is believed Katranis was killed for loyalty concerns with him working with other organized crime groups, and for getting himself involved in a bar fight with Ronnie Morelli, an enforcer and driver for Anthony "Tony Jack" Giacalone, several weeks prior to his murder.
Harvey Leach	March 15-16, 1974	Leach was an associate of the Detroit family, and a furniture store owner. It is believed Vito “Billy Jack” Giacalone was involved in his murder, possibly as a result of Leach dating the girlfriend of Giacalone whilst he was in prison and also for owing Giacalone a substantial amount of money. Leach was found inside of the trunk of his 1973 Lincoln Mark vehicle. According to the Oakland County Medical Examiner’s office, the cause of death was noted as a neck wound, inflicted by a cleaver or an axe.
David DeLarosa	June 21, 1974	28-year old DeLarosa was shot and killed as coup to take over his illegal numbers business, by Norman "Pete the Arm" Crawford, an enforcer for William "Billy Lee" Loiacano, the nephew to the Giacalone brothers.
Jimmy Hoffa	July 30, 1975	62-year old Hoffa was last seen alive enroute to a meeting with Tony Giacalone, Lenny Schultz and Anthony "Tony Pro" Provenzano, a capo in the New York based Genovese family. Hoffa was murdered for his attempt to reclaim the Teamster union presidency following his five-year prison term for bribery, fraud and jury tampering.
Otto Wendel	December, 1977	Wendel served as the Secretary-Treasurer of Teamster Local 299. It is believed Wendel was shot and killed in his car, by a .38-caliber revolver, in Livingston County, Michigan to prevent him from testifying against Vincent "Little Vince" Meli in an extortion trial.
John "Johnny Coach" Cociu	January, 1980	Cociu was an associate of the Detroit family and a businessman, owning several bars in the Detroit area with Francis "Big Frank Nitti" Usher, a powerful Detroit drug dealer. Cociu was found shot and his head was decapitated, on January 23, 1980, in the trunk of his car, in Detroit, Michigan. The murder of Cociu remains unsolved.
Carlo Licata	July 30, 1981	Licata served as a soldier in the Detroit family, and is the son of Nick Licata, the former boss of the Los Angeles family, he was also the brother-in-law to Jack Tocco. Licata was shot twice in the chest and killed, he was found at his home, located at Long Lake Drive in Bloomfield Township, Michigan. No one was ever charged in connection with his death.
David Auer	June, 1983	Auer was found dead in the trunk of his Mercedes vehicle in the parking lot of hotel in Pontiac, Auer was beaten and shot in the head. Bernard "Bernie the Jew" Schrott and Billy Giacalone had split a million-dollar life-insurance pay out following the death of Auer.
Eddie Schave	August, 1983	Schave was an associate of the Detroit family, and a nightclub and restaurant owner within the Detroit area. Schave was found dead inside the trunk of his 1978 Oldsmobile Toronado vehicle. The murder of Schave remains unsolved.
Ralph Proctor	August 10, 1984	Proctor was an associate of the Detroit family, and heavily active within the labor unions. Proctor was shot 3 times in the head inside of his car outside of a restaurant in Six Mile Road, between Newburgh and Levan, in Livonia, Michigan. It is believed Proctor was murdered as a result of threatening to expose Detroit family activates within the labor unions if he was not repaid a loan he had previously given to a Teamster union. It has been alleged that Anthony "Chicago Tony" La Piana was possibly involved in his murder.
Peter "Fast Pete" Cavataio	July 9, 1985	Cavataio was found shot and tortured inside of a garage under the Ambassador Bridge. It is believed Cavataio was beaten by baseball bats, stabbed with a knife, and shot twice with a .22 caliber pistol. At the time, Cavataio was under investigation for drug trafficking, Cavataio had also owed significant amounts of money to gamblers connected to the organization, although it is believed Cavataio was murdered as he had lost protection from the Detroit Outfit following the death of his brother-in-law, Dominic Corrado, in June 1985.
Jimmy Stabile	October, 1985	Stabile was an associate of the Detroit family and a bookmaker. Stabile and his wife were shot to death at a Detroit produce market, possibly due to a debt he owed to the Detroit Mob.
Mark Giancotti	February 10, 1989	Giancotti was an associate of the Detroit family. Giancotti was found shot to death in his car outside of a store in Rochester Hills, Michigan.
Dennis Graziani and Tommy Gambini	October/November, 1991	Gambini and Graziani were shot and killed by Detroit family soldier, Antonio "Dago Tony" Ciraulo, as Ciraulo believed both of the men were sent by the New York families to kill him, stemming from a dispute Ciraulo had with a Mob family based in New York. In October 1992, Ciraulo was sentenced to life in prison.
Feodies "Yellow Man" Shipp Jr.	July, 1992	Shipp was an associate of the Detroit family, and active in fraud and drug dealing. Shipp was murdered in an FBI or DEA-protected hotel room after he had testified in a narcotics trial, Shipp was found with his throat cut and his hands and feet were bound with phone cord.
Peter McNeil	February 10, 1998	McNeil had informed on the Detroit family regarding the crime family trafficking cocaine from Europe into the United States. McNeil was shot three times and killed at his home in Hook, Hampshire, UK, whilst living under the name of James Lawson.
Jerome "Jerry the Blade" Bianchette	August 10, 2002	Bianchette was an associate of the Detroit family. It is believed Bianchette had previously served as an enforcer and driver to Anthony Joseph Zerilli. Bianchette was killed by a shotgun blast at a construction site in Macomb County, Michigan.
Carlo Bommarito	January 20, 2007	Bommarito served as a soldier for the Detroit family, and is the son of Frank "Frankie the Bomb" Bommarito, who had once served as a captain in the Detroit family, before dying in October 2016 at the age of 87. It is believed Bommarito was murdered for allegedly cooperating with the authorities.

== See also ==
- The Purple Gang
- The Flathead gang
- Paul Jaworski – boss of Flathead gang

General:

- Crime in Detroit
- History of Italian Americans in Metro Detroit
- List of Italian Mafia crime families

== Sources ==
=== Books ===
- Brandt, Charles. I Heard You Paint Houses: Frank "the Irishman" Sheeran and the inside story of the Mafia, the Teamsters, and the last ride of Jimmy Hoffa, Steerforth Press, Hanover (NH, USA) 2004. (ISBN 1-58642-077-1)
- Burnstein, Scott M. (2006). Motor City Mafia. Mount Pleasant, South Carolina: Arcadia Publishing. ISBN 978-0-7385-4084-9.
- Kelly, Robert J. Encyclopedia of Organized Crime in the United States. Westport, Connecticut: Greenwood Press, 2000. ISBN 0-313-30653-2
- Moldea, Dan E. The Hoffa Wars, Charter Books, New York: 1978 ISBN 0-441-34010-5
- Sifakis, Carl. The Encyclopedia of American Crime. New York: Facts on File Inc., 2001. ISBN 0-8160-4040-0
- Sifakis, Carl. The Mafia Encyclopedia. New York: Da Capo Press, 2005. ISBN 0-8160-5694-3
- Waugh, Daniel (2019). Vinnitta: The Birth of the Detroit Mafia. Lulu Publishing Services. ISBN 9781483496276.

=== Reports ===
- Keeney, John C. (January 31, 1984). Organized Crime in the Great Lakes Region (PDF) (Report). Deputy Assistant Attorney General Criminal Division – via National Criminal Justice Reference Service.
