= Vito Giacalone =

American mobster (1923–2012)

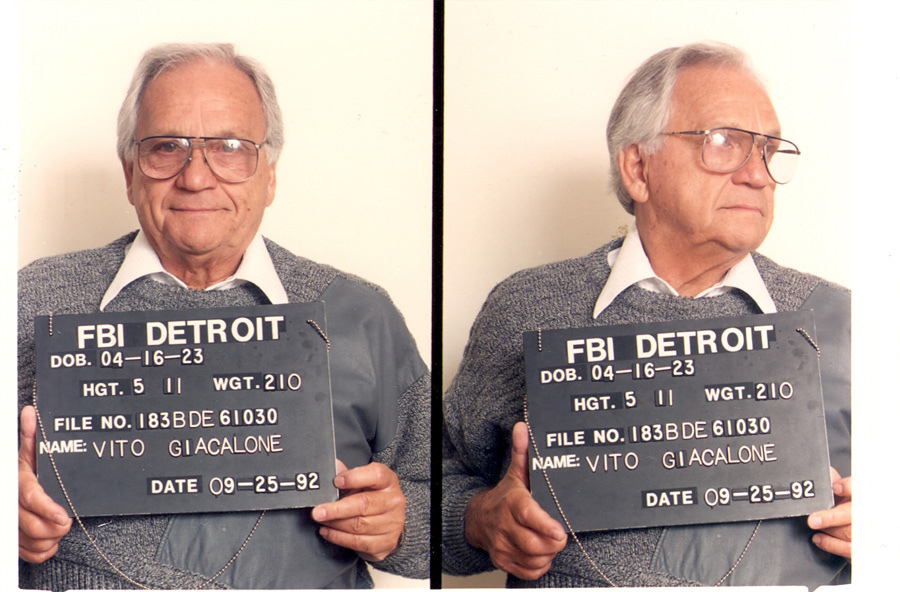
Detroit Partnership member Giacalone in 1992

Vito William "Billy Jack" Giacalone (April 16, 1923 – February 19, 2012) was an American organized crime figure in Detroit who served as a capo in the Detroit Partnership. He was the younger brother of Anthony "Tony Jack" Giacalone, also a capo in the Detroit Partnership.

Vito Giacalone was described in a 1992 court document as "the most important figure in the Detroit 'Family' after its 'boss' Jack Tocco". Furthermore, a 1992 IRS document cited Giacalone as "one of the prime suspects in the 1975 disappearance of former Teamsters leader James R. Hoffa".
