= Jack Tocco =

Italian-American mob boss

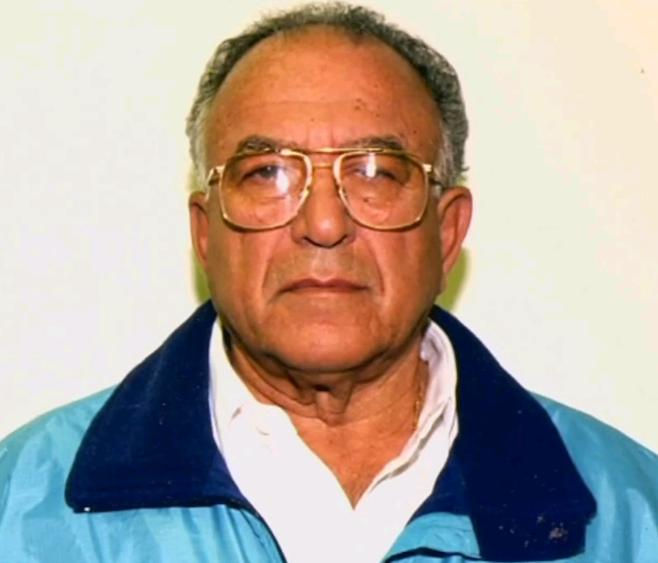
- Born: Giacomo William Tocco; Oct 1926; Grosse Pointe Park, Michigan, U.S.
- Died: July 14, 2014 (aged 87)
- Other name: “Black Jack”
- Education: University of Detroit (BS)
- Occupation: Crime boss
- Allegiance: Detroit Partnership
- Criminal charges: Extortion, racketeering, conspiracy
- Penalty: 1 year (1998); 34 months (2000)

Giacomo "Jack" William Tocco (c. October 1926 – July 14, 2014) was an Italian-American mobster and the longtime mob boss of the criminal organization known as the Detroit Partnership, based in Detroit, Michigan. He had numerous legitimate business holdings. Tocco was also convicted of horse doping at Hazel Park Raceway in 1970, as was widely reported in The Detroit News and The Detroit Free Press.

== Early life ==
Tocco was born in 1926 to parents Vito William Tocco and Rosalie Zerilli. He was raised in the upscale Windmill Pointe section of Grosse Pointe Park. In 1949, Tocco received a degree in finance from the University of Detroit.

== Criminal career ==
In 1979, Jack Tocco assumed leadership of the Detroit Partnership following the death of Joseph Zerilli. Tocco inherited a decimated organization with several key members facing prison. Tocco also lost a valuable resource with the death of Papa John Priziola, one of the last original ruling dons from the Partnership's inception in 1931. Around this time Jack's cousin Anthony Zerilli was released from prison. While many expected trouble between them, Tony found himself in legal troubles after being recorded bragging to a Federal Bureau of Investigation informant about his activities in Las Vegas. This triggered a federal investigation into the Detroit Family's interest in the Aladdin Hotel and Casino, which was being operated by convicted bank robber James Tamer.

== Real estate holdings ==
Jack Tocco accumulated an impressive real estate portfolio, which he and brother Tony have successfully managed. Amongst these is the 32-acre (13 ha) spread purchased in 1973 for $112,000. The property borders the Royal View Estates, a housing development started by the Tocco brothers in the 1990s. Located in Oakland Township, Royal View netted the brothers several million in profit. The plot was originally planned for fifteen luxury homes located on a 40-acre (16 ha) tract. According to land records, the Tocco brothers paid for the cost of the utility connections to be put in and then sold the lots to buyers and contractors who built the houses themselves. The Royal View project inspired the creation of the Royal View Estates Condominium Association in October 1989. Its founders were Jack and Anthony Tocco and Vito and William Badamo. The Toccos also planned on using another company, the Royal Construction Co., to develop condominiums and houses in the range of approximately 3,000 sq ft (280 m^{2}) apiece. Three months after the project began, Tocco & Tocco was replaced as contractor by Royal Construction, which was founded in 1964 by Sam Barone and Carlo Licata (who was married to Jack's sister and later to Santo Perrone’s daughter). As of 1996 the Tocco brothers owned at least one undeveloped lot in Royal View, with total revenues on home sales exceeding $6 million.

Tocco's properties included a condo in Boca Raton, Florida, purchased in 1993. His commercial holdings include three buildings and $1 million in commercial land in Warren, and several undisclosed properties. It was rumored that Tocco owned the Hillcrest Country Club & Moravian Hills Golf Club in Macomb County, where he allegedly used James Tamer and Simon Thomas as fronts to ensure the club's liquor license was approved. Purchased by Woodrow Woody in 1949, Hillcrest listed some of Michigan's most influential people as members. Woody sold the property to the Partnership's front man, James Tamer in 1980 for $6.5 million. In 1984, Tamer sold the property to Simon Thomas, a nightclub operator who shared a Lebanese heritage with the two previous owners. Thomas used his entertainment industry connections to bring in stars like Frank Sinatra, Paul Anka and Wayne Newton to perform in his establishments. In 2005 the Hillcrest Country Club & Moravian Hills Golf Club was sold. 30 acres of the site were used to develop the George George community park, while the remainder was sold to Meijer Inc. and a new Meijer's hypermarket was built on the location.

== RICO indictment ==
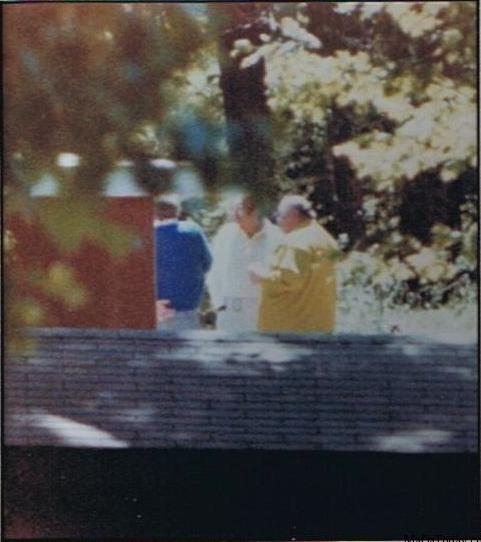
The photo was taken by FBI agents conducting a surveillance during the summer of 1979. The agents were able to surreptitiously witness and photograph a meeting celebrating Jack Tocco's elevation to head of the Detroit "family" of the LCN. The photo was introduced as evidence at the RICO trial of Detroit family hierarchy in 1998: Jack Tocco (center) along with Vito Giacalone (left) and Anthony Corrado (right).(Believed to be the only time such a meeting was ever witnessed/photographed by non-members of the Mafia.)

On March 15, 1996, Jack and 16 alleged Partnership members or associates were arrested. The government sought a forfeiture for proceeds derived from the defendants' respective alleged crimes, claiming that Tocco and four co-defendants were jointly and severally liable for $234,700 that had been collected in "street tax" extortions. The government further claimed that Jack Tocco, Anthony Corrado, and Vito Giacalone, in addition to the $234,700 amount, were jointly and severally liable for $4.2 million in profits from the sale of two hotels in Las Vegas (the Frontier Hotel and the Edgewater Hotel), $1 million extorted from Sal Vitello, and $38,400 in proceeds from the collection of unlawful gambling debts. Thus, the government sought a total forfeiture amount of $5,473,100. The district court concluded that the evidence presented by the government at trial did not provide, by a "preponderance of the evidence," a sufficiently quantified factual basis for assessing any forfeiture against the defendants. Prosecutors suffered another blow when Tony Zerilli and Tony Giacalone extended their trials indefinitely due to illness. The five defendants were charged, along with twelve other defendants, in a 25-count indictment relating to their alleged involvement in the Detroit branch of the national Mafia organization known as La Cosa Nostra. Jack Tocco and Anthony Corrado were convicted on two counts of conspiracy under the Racketeer Influenced and Corrupt Organizations Act (RICO), one based on a pattern of racketeering activity and one based upon the collection of unlawful debts, and on one count of a Hobbs Act conspiracy. Paul Corrado and Nove Tocco were convicted of the RICO pattern of racketeering activity conspiracy and the Hobbs Act conspiracy. Vito Giacalone pleaded guilty to the RICO collection of unlawful debts conspiracy. During sentencing, Jack Tocco was supported by several high-profile community figures, including former Detroit Tigers manager Sparky Anderson, ex-Warren Mayor Ronald Bonkowski, political fund-raiser Frank Stella, Tigers advertising agent Gary Vitto, members of the Kilgore family, Grosse Pointe City Councilman Patrick Petz and a host of restaurant owners, retired judges, doctors, lawyers and priests.

== Sentencing controversy ==
On November 13, 1998, Judge John Corbett O'Meara sentenced Tocco to a year or less in a halfway house, with stipulations that he could conduct family businesses daily and return to the facility at night. However, prosecutors demanded prison time, and on December 23, 1998, Tocco was re-sentenced to a year at the Federal Medical Facility in Rochester, Minnesota. His sentence was reduced for good behavior and he was released in 1999 after serving nearly 11 months. Still, prosecutors appealed Judge O'Meara's sentence, claiming it was below minimum sentencing requirements.

On January 5, 2000, the U.S. 6th Circuit Court of Appeals ruled that the judge who sentenced Tocco originally was too lenient in his sentence. Prosecutors arranged a deal with Tocco’s cousin, Nove, who was incarcerated on extortion charges. Nove agreed to testify against Jack Tocco, as long as he did not have to testify against his uncle Tony Zerilli, whom he considered a mentor. However, there was a problem with Nove's testimony; he was forced to admit that he never received direct orders from Jack Tocco allowing him to engage in the extortion activities that resulted in his original conviction. Nove was compelled to admit that his extortion of bookmakers was what had initially got him into trouble with brothers Jack and Tony Tocco. With prosecutors facing a situation potentially disastrous to their credibility, Tocco was re-sentenced to 34 months with credit for one year and one day served, making him eligible for early release. On November 21, 2001, Tocco was released from federal prison.

== Family and personal life ==
Jack Tocco was married for over sixty years and had eight children and seventeen grandchildren. He died on July 14, 2014.

== See also ==
- Gaspar Milazzo
- Joseph Zerilli
- Jimmy Hoffa
