= Joseph Zerilli =

Italian-American crime boss (1897–1977)

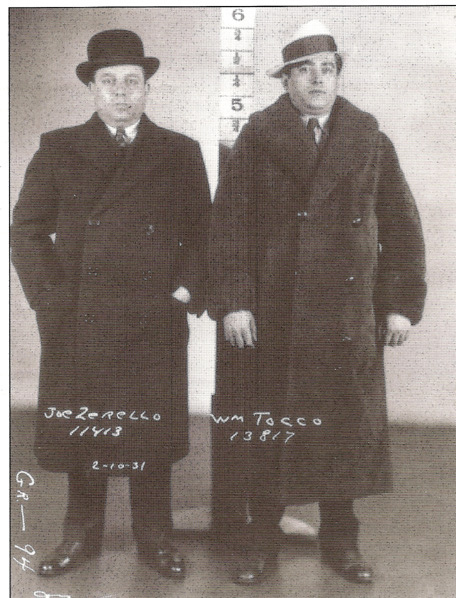
- Zerilli (left) and William Tocco, 1931
- Born: Giuseppe Zerilli; December 10, 1897; Terrasini, Sicily, Italy
- Died: October 30, 1977 (aged 79); Grosse Pointe, Michigan, U.S.
- Resting place: Mount Olivet Cemetery, Detroit, Michigan
- Occupation: Crime boss
- Children: Anthony Joseph Zerilli
- Allegiance: Detroit Partnership

Joseph Zerilli (born Giuseppe Zerilli; Italian pronunciation: [dʒuˈzɛppe ddzeˈrilli]; December 10, 1897 – October 30, 1977) was an Italian-born American mobster who rose to power in the crime family known as the Detroit Partnership, leading from the 1930s through much of the 1970s. He immigrated to the United States from Sicily in 1914 at the age of 17.

== Early life ==
Zerilli was born on December 10, 1897, in Terrasini, Sicily, to Anthony and Rosalie Zerilli. He immigrated in 1914 at age 17 to the United States, settling in Detroit along with numerous other Italian immigrants, especially many from Sicily.

While working as a laborer with the Detroit Gas Company, Zerilli joined the Purple Gang, founded by brothers and Abe Bernstein and his brothers Bugs Bill, Raymond and Isadore, who had moved from New York as youths. Other founders were Harry Fleisher, and Louis Fleisher. After Michigan had prohibited liquor sales a few years before the Prohibition era started nationwide in the United States, these young men developed a street gang into what became known as the Purple Gang. It was dominated by American-born Jews whose parents had immigrated from the Russian Empire and eastern Europe. They smuggled liquor first from Ohio, which still allowed sales. After Prohibition, they smuggled liquor from Windsor, Ontario, across the Detroit River in Canada, and used many other waterways between the two countries, selling the illegal products at great profit.

Zerilli began working with mobster Gaspar Milazzo to expand into loansharking, extortion, narcotics, labor racketeering, and bookmaking. The Purple Gang dominated the Detroit underworld into the early 1930s.

== Rise to power ==
In 1930, following the murder of Milazzo by New York mobsters, the Purple Gang became involved in syndicate gambling operations. The gang suffered much internal dissension and violence. By 1936, Zerilli assumed operational control of Detroit's criminal operations, which were dominated by Italian immigrants from Sicily. They formed what became known as the Detroit Partnership. In the early years, William Tocco was the official boss, and Zerilli succeeded him in 1964.

In 1931, Lucky Luciano of New York formed The Commission, which initially consisted of seven family bosses: the leaders of New York's Five Families: Charlie "Lucky" Luciano, Vincent Mangano, Tommy Gagliano, Joseph Bonanno, and Joe Profaci; Chicago Outfit boss Al Capone; and Stefano Magaddino, boss of the Buffalo, New York family. Charlie Luciano was appointed chairman of the Commission. The Commission agreed to hold meetings every five years or when they needed to discuss family problems.

After a 1956 Commission meeting, the crime families of Philadelphia, headed by Angelo Bruno, and Detroit, headed by Zerilli, were added to The Commission.

Zerilli was later convicted of carrying a concealed weapon.

== Later life ==
After more than 40 years, Zerilli retired from racketeering in 1970. His son, Anthony Zerilli, known as Tony, assumed control. In 1950 the younger Zerilli, then in his early 20s, had become a majority owner of the Hazel Park Raceway (with family help); it was located in suburban Detroit. With gambling in Michigan limited to betting at racetracks, Hazel Park generated millions of dollars in revenue for the Detroit Partnership.

In 1970 Tony became boss of the Partnership. Five years later, after he was convicted and imprisoned for concealing interests in a Las Vegas syndicate casino, his father coming out of retirement to once again lead the partnership.

On October 30, 1977, Joseph Zerilli died of natural causes. He was buried at Mount Olivet Cemetery in Detroit, Michigan. His nephew Jack Tocco was named to head the partnership. After Tony Zerilli got out of prison, he became an underboss reporting to Tocco.

In April 2000, Joseph Zerilli's grandson, Nove Tocco, a Detroit syndicate soldier, agreed to testify against his cousin Jack Tocco, still boss of the Detroit crime syndicate. Nove Tocco was the first member of the Detroit crime family to turn state's evidence since the family's founding in 1921.
