= William Tocco =

Italian-American crime boss (1897–1972)

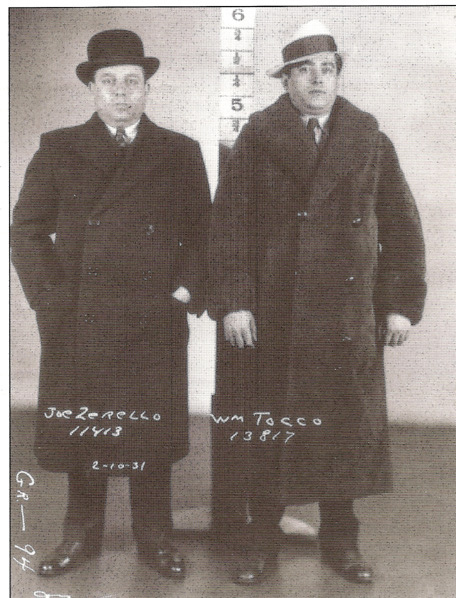
- Tocco (right) and Joseph Zerilli, 1931
- Born: Guglielmo Vito Tocco; February 12, 1897; Terrasini, Sicily, Kingdom of Italy
- Died: May 28, 1972 (aged 75); Grosse Pointe, Michigan, U.S.
- Resting place: Holy Sepulchre Cemetery, Michigan, U.S.
- Other name: Black Bill
- Citizenship: American
- Occupation: Crime boss
- Successor: Joseph Zerilli
- Spouse: Rosalia Zerilli (m. 1923)
- Children: 7, including Jack Tocco
- Relatives: Nick Licata (co-father-in-law); Joe Profaci (co-father-in-law); Joseph Zerilli (cousin and brother-in-law)
- Allegiance: Detroit Partnership

William Vito "Black Bill" Tocco (born Guglielmo Vito Tocco; February 12, 1897 – May 28, 1972) was an Italian-American mobster from Grosse Pointe Park, Michigan and a founding member of the Detroit Partnership of La Cosa Nostra.

== Early life ==
Tocco was born as Guglielmo Vito Tocco in Terrasini, Sicily on February 12, 1897. He was one of seven children born to Giacomo Tocco and Nicolina Moceri. In 1912, the Tocco family immigrated to the United States, and settled in Detroit, Michigan. Tocco became a naturalized citizen after serving in the United States Army during World War I.

== Criminal career ==
After returning to Detroit, Tocco joined his cousin Giuseppe Zerilli and Angelo Meli in backing the Giannola Brothers' bootlegging operations. On August 11, 1920, he was arrested for the murder of Antonio Badalamenti, a Vitale Gang leader killed in retaliation for an attack on Giuseppe Manzello and Angelo Polizzi. The charges were dropped two days later. With Manzello dead, Meli took over the Giannola Gang, renaming it the Eastside Mob, and appointing Tocco and Zerilli as his top aides.

After Giovanni Vitale's death on October 2, 1920, Salvatore Catalanotte dominated the Sicilian crime syndicate and organized the Pascuzzi Combine – a liquor syndicate consisting of the remaining gangs. With profits made by Tocco and Zerilli's in the Pascuzzi Combine, they purchased the Pheiffer Brewing Co. Pheiffer's assets were then taken over by States Products Co. The company continued producing malt products and did well for around five years, then it was changed to the Pheiffer Products Co.

On February 5, 1932, Tocco was arrested for conspiracy to violate the National Prohibition Act. Eight days after the raid, a federal injunction closed Pheiffer Products and Meyer Products for alleged wort production. Not long after this arrest, Zerilli and Tocco were barred from participating in the legal beer business by the Michigan Liquor Control Commission and were ordered to sell their interest in the Pheiffer Brewing.

== Personal life ==
In 1923, Tocco married Rosalia Zerilli, sister of Joseph Zerilli, and they purchased land in Grosse Pointe Park where they raised their seven children, including Jack Tocco, who would become a feared Detroit mafioso. Tocco's success in bootlegging earned him respect from Mafia families nationwide. In 1952, his son Anthony Tocco married Carmela Profaci, daughter of Joe Profaci. Due to the ties of his family and widespread respect, he was a major factor in aligning the Partnership with several crime families, including the Profaci crime family in New York. William Tocco’s bloodline reached from New York to Los Angeles just through the marriages of his children.

In 1953, Tocco’s daughter, Grace, married Carlo Licata the son of Nick Licata, a former mobster who was ousted by the Detroit Family and was adopted by the Los Angeles crime family headed by Jack Dragna. Furthermore, Tocco’s son, Jack, married the daughter of Angelo Meli, a fellow bootlegger from Detroit.

== The Hazel Park Race Track ==
The outfit's involvement with Hazel Park began in 1948 following the visit of a local auto dealer, Waldo Andrews to the law office of James Bellanca. Andrews had secured a 30-day option letter to purchase the Hazel Park Stadium Company (HPSC). Andrews then went on to fill Bellanca in with the details of the company plans, which centered around the proposed construction of an automobile or harness racing track in Hazel Park, Michigan. Bellanca started soliciting for investors, who happened to be Tocco and Joe Zerilli, through this they formed a second corporation, named Hazel Park Racing Association. The track was finished after Bellanca attained money from the syndicate leaders. Hazel Parks success led to a dispute between HPSC's original incorporators and Bellanca's Hazel Park Racing Association. Tocco, Zerilli and Bellanca expanded their interest in horse racing on June 27, 1957, by purchasing the Wheeling Downs Race Track in Wheeling, West Virginia.

== Last years and death ==
Tocco spent most of the last nine years of his life in Miami, Florida. On May 28, 1972, he died in Bon Secours Hospital (now Beaumont Hospital) in Grosse Pointe City, Michigan. He was 75 years old and he left behind his wife Rosalia, his children, and 28 grandchildren. The funeral was held in the Church of the Holy Family in Detroit. He is buried in Holy Sepulchre Cemetery.
