= Steven La Torre =

Italian-American mobster (1886–1984)

- Born: Stefano La Torre; March 12, 1886; Montedoro, Sicily, Kingdom of Italy
- Died: July 5, 1984 (aged 98); Pittston, Pennsylvania, U.S.
- Resting place: Memorial Shrine Cemetery, Carverton, Pennsylvania, U.S.
- Citizenship: United States
- Occupation: Crime boss
- Spouse: Rose Lucchino
- Children: 4
- Allegiance: Bufalino crime family

Steven Joseph La Torre (born Stefano La Torre; Italian: [ˈsteːfano la ˈtorre]; March 12, 1886 – July 5, 1984) was an Italian-American crime boss of the Bufalino crime family. He founded what would become the Bufalino crime family, which he ran from 1903 to 1908.

== Early life ==
La Torre was born on March 12, 1886, in Montedoro, Sicily, to Giuseppe La Torre and Maria Marranca. He entered the United States in May 1903, settling in Pittston, Pennsylvania. He set up a criminal empire in Pittston-Scranton-Wilkes-barre areas of Pennsylvania. La Torre paid for the passage of Mafia boss Santo Volpe to Pennsylvania in 1906. They formed "the men from Montedoro". In April 1907, La Torre was arrested with Santo Volpe, Charles Bufalino, uncle of future crime boss Russell Bufalino, and twenty other men for a protection racket against mine workers in the region.

La Torre married Rose Lucchino, and had two sons, Joseph and Samuel, and two daughters, Mary and Lena.

== Criminal career ==
In 1908, La Torre stepped down as boss of Pittston, but remained connected to the Mafia. Volpe became the new crime boss. In 1955, La Torre was called to a meeting with Joe Barbara where he refused to have a possible rat in the Pittston crime organization killed. Barbara became angry with La Torre and reduced his influence in the Mafia. La Torre remained a consultant to Russell Bufalino until his death in 1984.

== Death ==
La Torre died of natural causes on July 5, 1984, at the age of 98. He is buried in Memorial Shrine Cemetery, Carverton, Pennsylvania.

American Mafia
Preceded by Tommaso Petto	Bufalino crime family Boss; 1903–1908	Succeeded by Santo Volpe
