= Bufalino crime family =

Italian-American Mafia crime family

- Founded: c. 1900; 126 years ago
- Founder: Stefano LaTorre
- Named after: Russell Bufalino
- Founding location: Pittston, Pennsylvania, United States
- Years active: c. 1900–2008
- Territory: Primarily Northeastern Pennsylvania (especially the counties of Lackawanna and Luzerne), with additional territory in the Southern Tier of New York, Central New York, New York City and North Jersey, as well as South Florida
- Ethnicity: Italians as "made men" and other ethnicities as associates
- Membership (est.): 30–40 made members (1960s)
- Activities: Racketeering, counterfeiting, loansharking, extortion, illegal gambling, cartage theft, jewel theft, fraud, bid rigging, labor racketeering, narcotics trafficking, automobile theft, fencing of stolen goods, pornography and murder
- Allies: Buffalo crime family; Cleveland crime family; Colombo crime family; Detroit Partnership; Genovese crime family; Los Angeles crime family; Patriarca crime family; Philadelphia crime family; Pittsburgh crime family; Hells Angels MC
- Rivals: Various gangs in Northeastern Pennsylvania

The Bufalino crime family, also known as the Pittston crime family, the Pittston–Scranton crime family, the Scranton–Wilkes-Barre crime family, the Northeastern Pennsylvania crime family, the Northeastern Pennsylvania Mafia, or the Scranton Mafia, was an Italian American Mafia crime family active in Northeastern Pennsylvania, primarily in the cities of Scranton, Wilkes-Barre, and Pittston.

Based in Pennsylvania's Coal Region, the family's power originated in labor racketeering within the coal industry, as well as the garment industry in Pittston and New York City, where the Bufalino family colluded with the Five Families of New York. The family's namesake and longest-serving boss, Russell Bufalino, led the organization until his death in 1994.

== History ==
La Cosa Nostra (LCN) in Pittston originated in the 1880s, with one of the earliest known Sicilian Mafia members residing in the city being Stefano "Steven" La Torre, who settled in Pittston after immigrating from Montedoro in Sicily. La Torre formed a group of Montedoresi criminals, which included Santo Volpe. Volpe took over as boss of the Northeastern Pennsylvania crime family after La Torre abdicated the position. Under Volpe's leadership, the family took control of local bootlegging, counterfeiting, Italian lottery, and "black hand" extortion rackets.

Situated in the anthracite Coal Region of Pennsylvania, the family infiltrated the area's coal-mining companies as well as the United Mine Workers Union, the labor union that represented mine workers in contract negotiations with company management. During the 1930s, Volpe became a member of the State Coal Commission, and members of his crime family gradually took control of coal companies and union locals. Volpe was later succeeded as boss by Giovanni "John" Sciandra, a partner in the Knox Coal Company of Luzerne County. The family controlled a large territory in Northeastern Pennsylvania—which included Pittston, Scranton, Wilkes-Barre, Wyoming, Luzerne, Allentown, Hazleton, Bethlehem, Lancaster, and Easton—as well as Binghamton, Endicott, Endwell, Johnson City, and Auburn, in the Southern Tier of New York state.

=== Bufalino and Barbara hosting the Apalachin meeting ===
After the death of boss John Sciandra in 1949, the family elected Rosario Alberto "Russell" Bufalino to become the new boss of the crime family.

In November 1957, boss Russell Bufalino and Buffalo crime family caporegime Joseph Barbara held a national Cosa Nostra meeting at his Apalachin, New York estate. The meeting was preceded by the assassination of Albert Anastasia by a few weeks, as well as a smaller meeting at the New Jersey estate of Ruggiero Boiardo. The Apalachin meeting was attended by about 100 Mafia heads from the U.S., Italy and Cuba. A raid by New York State Police caught many heads of families or their deputies. Many other family heads and their deputies were suspected of being present by law enforcement but evaded detection and capture. All those apprehended were fined, up to $10,000 each, and given prison sentences ranging from three to five years, however, all the convictions were overturned on appeal in 1960.

=== Bufalino era ===
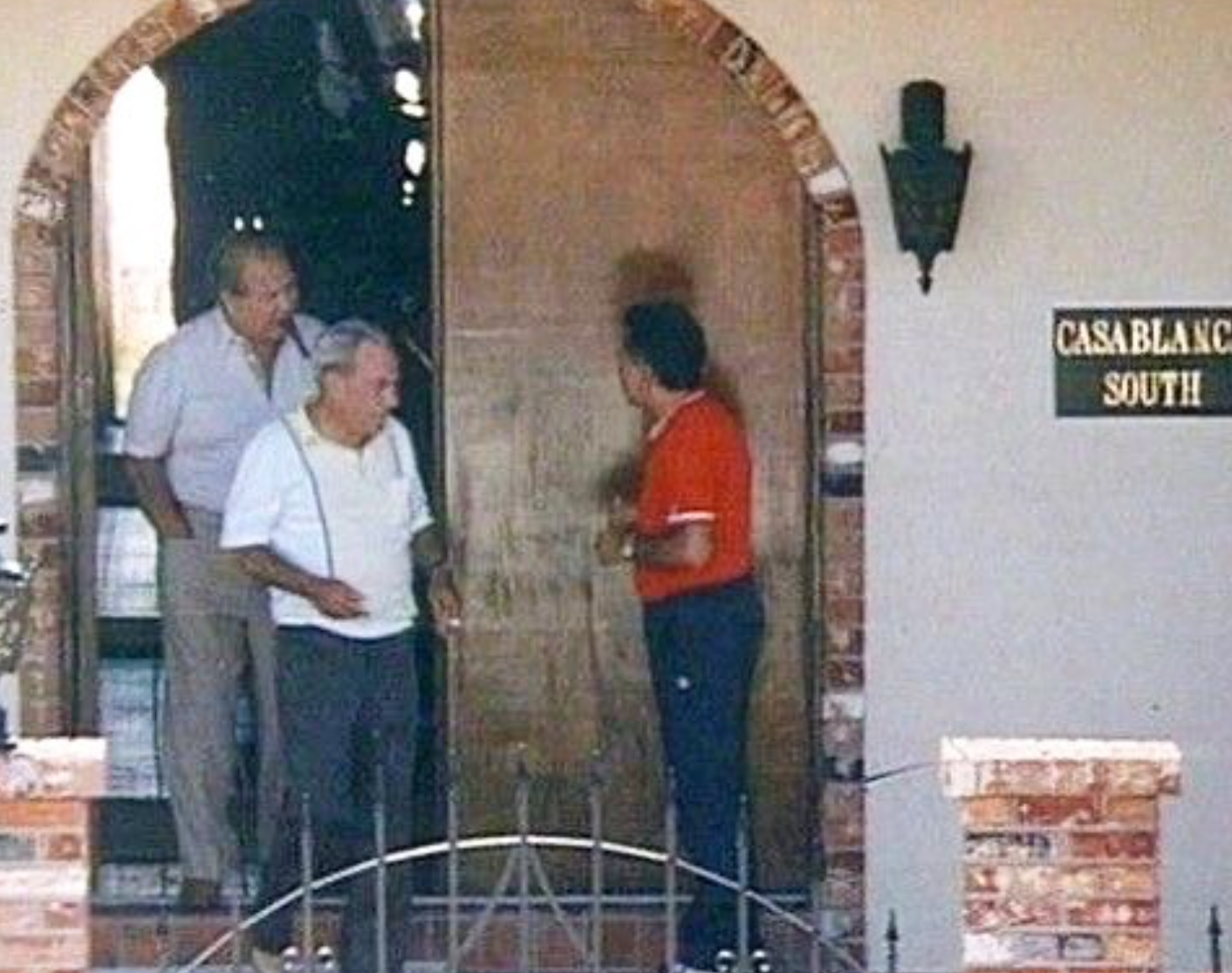
FBI surveillance photo of Buffalo boss Joe Todaro (L) along with Bufalino Underboss Eddie Sciandra (C) and Philadelphia boss Nicodemo Scarfo (R) meeting at Scarfo place in Fort Lauderdale Florida in 1986

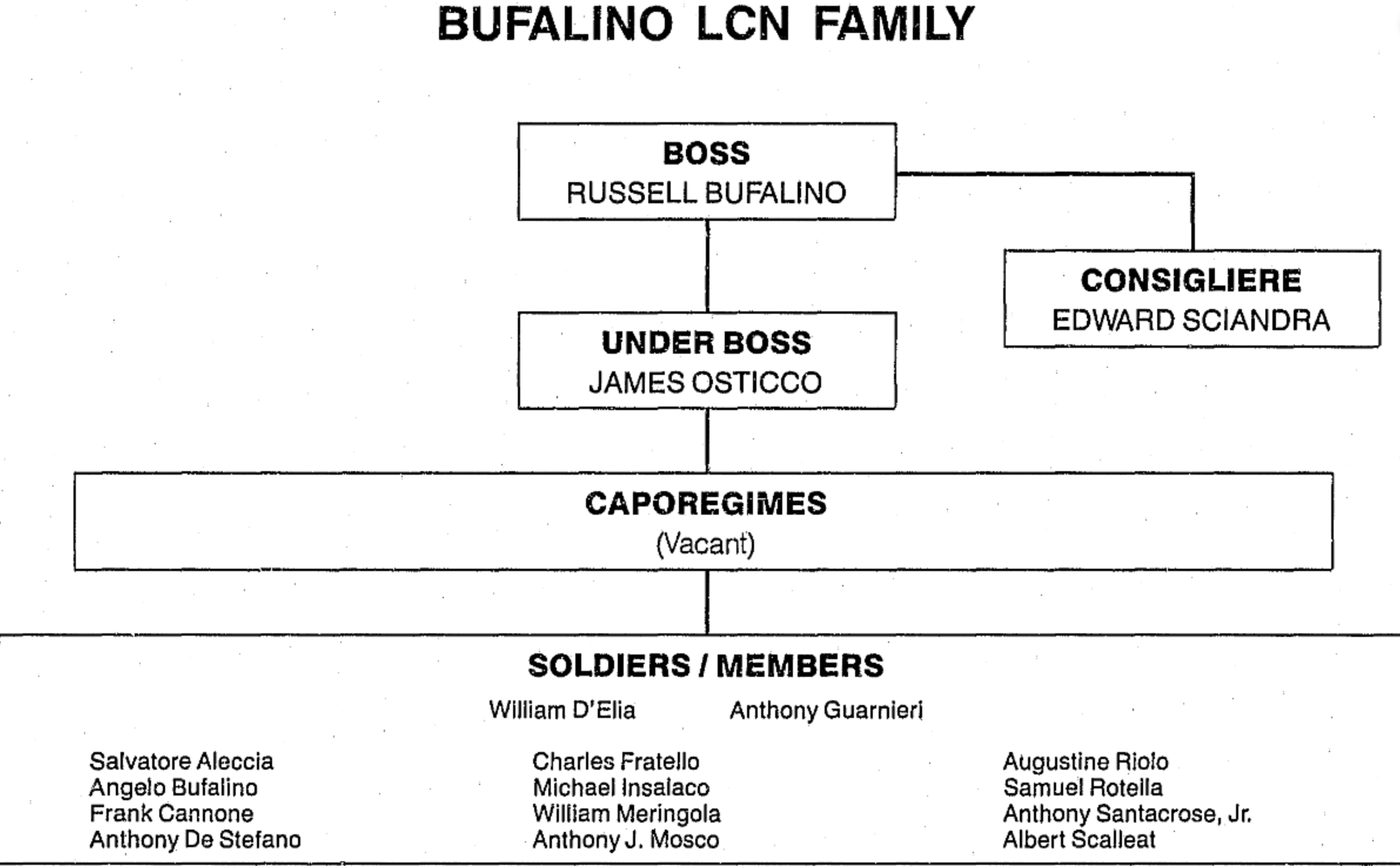
Bufalino crime family chart in 1989

Russell Bufalino became a powerful Mafia boss. He owned at least seven dress factories in the Pittston area and exercised complete control over the region's garment industry. Bufalino also spearheaded the family's infiltration of the Garment District of New York City. Additionally, the family became increasingly active in Central New York state and South Florida. During the 1960s, the family had a membership of 30 or 40 "made men".

The Bufalino family formed working relationships with other Mafia families as well as non-traditional organized crime groups such as outlaw motorcycle gangs. The family was permitted to maintain business interests in New York City by the Five Families. The Bufalino family relied on a New York family for representation on the national Mafia Commission, and the Colombo crime family represented the organization for many years. Additionally, the family maintained a close alliance with the Genovese crime family due to common interests in New York City and northern New Jersey.

After Bufalino was imprisoned in the late 1970s on extortion charges related to the collection of a debt, William "Big Billy" D'Elia became the family acting boss with the support from underboss Edward Sciandra. D'Elia was aided in running the family by captains Anthony Guarnieri, James David Osticco, and Phillip Medico, consigliere Remo Allio, as well as soldiers Angelo Bufalino, John Rizzo, Angelo Son, and Joseph Sperrazza. Bufalino was released from prison in 1980 briefly after serving his sentence for extortion. Towards the end of 1981, Bufalino was again imprisoned after being found guilty of conspiring to kill Jack Napoli, a witness in his 1978 extortion trial. Bufalino learned the whereabouts of Napoli, then in the Witness Protection Program, and conspired with Los Angeles mobster Jimmy Fratianno and another man he met in prison to murder Napoli. Fratianno turned government informant and testified against Bufalino at trial. He was sentenced to ten years imprisonment and released in 1989.

With the decline of Pennsylvania's coal industry, many of the Bufalino family's rackets became less lucrative. The membership of the family was also decimated during the 1980s by eight prosecutions, involving 24 members and associates, and eleven deaths. The family ceased inducting new members in the late 1970s due to Bufalino's apparent reluctance to recruit, and the Commission later prohibited the Bufalino family from permitting new members or appointing a new boss. The Genovese and Gambino families were given permission to assume control of the Bufalino family's activities in New York.

=== D'Elia, the last boss ===
Russell Bufalino died on February 25, 1994, of natural causes near Pittston, Pennsylvania. William "Big Billy" D'Elia became the new boss of the Bufalino family after the death of Bufalino. D'Elia started his criminal career in the Bufalino family in the late 1960s as Bufalino's driver, after his late sister married the only son of capo James David Osticco. According to the Pennsylvania Crime Commission, D'Elia was placed in the crew of caporegime Phillip Medico. D'Elia advanced through the ranks of the organization rather quickly, due to the natural attrition of members and indictments in the 1980s and 1990s. He took over the crime family's solid waste rackets and oversaw the traditional Mafia rackets run by the members and associates of the family. D'Elia also attempted to replenish the aging ranks of the family, with limited success. As boss, D'Elia worked with the other crime families in New York City, Pittsburgh, Philadelphia, Southern Florida, and Los Angeles. In the 1990s, D'Elia was linked to a money laundering scheme involving numerous Northeastern Pennsylvania bookmakers, escort services, corrupt politicians, and associates of Russian organized crime. D'Elia was closely aligned with the Philadelphia crime family. When Philadelphia crime family boss John Stanfa was imprisoned, D'Elia was one of Stanfa's choices as interim caretaker of the family.

On May 31, 2001, agents from the Criminal Investigation Division of the IRS, U.S. Postal Inspectors, and Pennsylvania State Police executed search warrants at the homes of D'Elia, his mistress Jeanie Stanton, Thomas Joseph, and Marranca, who has been identified as an informant working for the FBI and the Pennsylvania State Police. Marranca also testified on behalf of authorities against Louis DeNaples in front of the Fourth Statewide Investigating Grand Jury, in regards to DeNaples' mob ties and his ownership of the Mount Airy Casino. On February 26, 2003, D'Elia was banned from entering any Atlantic City, New Jersey casinos by the New Jersey Division of Gaming Enforcement, based on information shared by the Federal Bureau of Investigation and the Pennsylvania Crime Commission.

On May 31, 2006, D'Elia was indicted on federal charges of laundering $600,000 in illegal drug proceeds obtained from a Florida-based associate of the Bufalino crime family, among others, including Lucchese family associate Phillip "Fipper" Forgione. While D'Elia was free on bail, he solicited a U.S. Customs Agency informant to murder a witness in the case and was remanded to prison until his eventual guilty plea and sentencing. In March 2008, D'Elia pleaded guilty to witness tampering and money laundering. He was sentenced to nine years in prison. D'Elia cooperated with the government and testified against Louis DeNaples, the owner of Mount Airy Casino Resort in the Pocono Mountains. In 2010, D'Elia got two years dropped from his sentence for his assisting the government's investigation against DeNaples.

=== Status ===
In 2011, author Dave Janoski interviewed former Pennsylvania Crime Commission investigator James Kanavy who asserted that there is no longer a standalone family in Northeastern Pennsylvania, and that any remnants of the Mafia family would be aligned with the New York families.

== Historical leadership ==
=== Boss (official and acting) ===
- 1900–1905: Tommaso Petto — killed
- 1905–1908: Stefano LaTorre — stepped down
- 1908–1933: Santo Volpe — retired in 1933
- 1933–1949: Giovanni "John" Sciandra — died of natural causes in 1949. There is a common misconception he was murdered in 1940, but newspaper articles confirm he died of natural causes in 1949.
- 1949–1994: Rosario Alberto "Russell" Bufalino — imprisoned from 1978 to 1989; retired, he died on February 25, 1994
  - Acting 1978–1994: William "Big Billy" D'Elia — became boss
- 1994–2008: William "Big Billy" D'Elia — in 2006 he was indicted on money laundering charges, in 2008 he pleaded guilty and testified in front of a grand jury for leniency.

== Former members ==
- Frank Cannone – former soldier, deceased, he ran a bookmaking operation in Binghamton, New York.
- Anthony Dominic "Cy" Ciotti – former soldier. Ciotti was born in Erie, Pennsylvania on September 19, 1928, and served in the U.S. Coast Guard. He operated a large narcotics trafficking ring. In May 1983, Ciotti jumped bail and failed to surrender to authorities after he was sentenced in Pittsburgh to fifteen years in federal prison for conspiracy to import and distribute synthetic heroin, marijuana and cocaine. He was added to the U.S. Marshals Service (USMS) 15 Most Wanted Fugitives list and was apprehended at the Sheraton Hotel in Manhattan, New York on March 24, 1985. He was released from federal custody on November 22, 1991. Ciotti died on July 2, 2021, at the age of 92.
- Anthony "the Bone" Cozzone - served as bookmaker and accountant during 1950s. He died in 2002.
- Joe Genovese - former soldier in the family's Scranton faction. Genovese died of natural causes in May 1982.
- Anthony F. Guarnieri – former caporegime, died in 1992.
- Phil Medico – former capo. Medico and his brother Billy owned Medico Industries, a defense contractor which produced ammunition for the United States military. He died on February 11, 1983, from natural causes.
- Anthony J. Mosco – former soldier, he was active in Binghamton, New York Mosco served 17 years in federal prison for racketeering along with capo Anthony "Guv" Guarnieri and other family members and associates. He currently resides in Arizona and Florida and has been seen visiting with family members and associates in the Pittston area in recent years.
- James "Dave" Osticco – former underboss to Russell Bufalino. Osticco was indicted for conspiracy and obstruction of justice in October 1982. He died in 1990.
- Gioacchino "Jack the Dandy" Parisi – former soldier. Parisi immigrated to the United States from Calabria in 1920. He was convicted in New York of narcotics trafficking in 1926 and served nearly six years in federal prison at Atlanta and Leavenworth. He became a gunman for Murder, Inc. and, in 1939, allegedly killed labor leader Morris Diamond and music publisher Irving Penn. Penn was apparently shot dead after being mistaken for garment union leader Philip Orlofsky. Afterwards, Parisi fled New York for Hazleton, Pennsylvania. He owned the Irene Dress Company in Hazleton, served as production manager of the Nuremberg Dress Company in Schuylkill County, and managed the Madison Dress Company in Hazleton. Parisi was arrested by the Pennsylvania State Police on October 14, 1949, and extradited to New York, where he was acquitted of the Diamond and Penn murders. He died of natural causes on December 27, 1982, at the age of 83.
- Angelo Parrino – former soldier. Parrino died in August 1982 from natural causes.
- Angelo Polizzi – served as consigliere to Giovanni Sciandra. He moved to Detroit and started the Polizzi line of L.C.N. figures in the Detroit area.
- Angelo Sciandra – former soldier. He was the son of Edward Sciandra. He died in 1987.
- Edward "Eddie the Conductor" Sciandra – former consigliere to Russell Bufalino and close associate of Anthony Guarnieri and William D'Elia. Sciandra was arrested for tax fraud in November 1981. He died in 2003.
- Dominick Sesso – former soldier. Sesso died of natural causes in September 1980.
- Angelo Son – former soldier. Son died of natural causes on June 13, 1981.
- Salvatore "Sal Vicious" Trivalino – former soldier. Trivalino attended the Apalachin meeting on November 14, 1957. He retired from organized crime on December 25, 1982.

== Former associates ==
- John Krasner – former associate. Krasner was a pornographer based in Allentown, Pennsylvania who was closely affiliated with Russell Bufalino. According to a 1977 Justice Department report, he controlled "the majority of the pornographic business in the Middle District of Pennsylvania, southern New York state and New Jersey". Krasner had an arrest record beginning in 1944 and was convicted of obscenity charges on at least five occasions, including twice in 1972, in June 1973, and in February 1975. He was involved in a dispute with his business partner, Allen C. Morrow, over control of the pornography empire they built together, during which several adult bookstores were bombed. Krasner paid a contract killer $10,000 to murder Morrow. The hitman informed Morrow of the murder contract and offered to kill Krasner, but Morrow instead alerted authorities. Krasner was convicted of the murder plot in 1977 and was subsequently released on appeal bond. In 1978, Krasner was arrested after allegedly assaulting a clergyman who was picketing one of his porn shops, but charges were later dismissed. On February 5, 1979, he was shot and killed aged 53 by Solomon Webb in a motel parking lot during an attempted robbery while on vacation in Fort Lauderdale, Florida. Webb was convicted of first-degree murder. Krasner's pornography empire was inherited by his wife and children.
- Joseph Nicholas Muruca – former associate. Muruca was born in Endicott, New York and operated a bookmaking operation in Binghamton, New York. After he attempted to become independent of the Bufalino family, Muruca was lured to a barn in Agawam, Massachusetts on August 11, 1981, where he was shot five times by members of the Springfield faction of the Genovese family, on the orders of Anthony Guarnieri. He survived the shooting. Muruca later became a government witness after he was convicted of drug dealing. Genovese associate John "Jake" Nettis was convicted of Maruca's shooting, while Adolfo Bruno was acquitted.
- David Rosen – former associate. Rosen was an associate of Russell Bufalino and testified before a U.S. Senate Permanent Subcommittee in Washington, D. C. that he and Bufalino were involved in the distribution of pornographic films together. Bufalino also helped Rosen with labor problems he was experiencing at his newspaper distribution company in New York City.
- Frank "The Irishman" Sheeran – former associate and right-hand man to Russell Bufalino. He was indicted in July 1980 with six others on labor racketeering charges, and on October 31, 1980, he was convicted and sentenced to a 32-year prison term, he served 13 years and was released in 1993. He died at age 83 on December 14, 2003.

== See also ==
- Crime in Pennsylvania
- List of Italian Mafia crime families

== Sources ==
=== Books ===
- Anastasia, George. The Goodfella Tapes (Avon, 1998). ISBN 0-380-79637-6.
- Brandt, Charles. I Heard You Paint Houses: Frank "The Irishman" Sheeran and the Inside Story of the Mafia, the Teamsters, and the Final Ride of Jimmy Hoffa (Steerforth, 2004). ISBN 1-58642-077-1.
- Birkbeck, Matt. The Quiet Don: The Untold Story of Mafia Kingpin Russell Bufalino (Berkley/Penguin, 2013). ISBN 978-0-425-26685-4

=== Reports ===
- Lewis Jr., Alvin B. (April 1981). 1980 Annual Report (PDF) (Report). Pennsylvania Crime Commission – via Government of Pennsylvania.
- Lewis Jr., Alvin B. (April 1982). 1981 Annual Report (PDF) (Report). Pennsylvania Crime Commission – via Government of Pennsylvania.
- Reilly, Michael J. (March 30, 1991). 1990 Annual Report – Organized Crime in Pennsylvania: A Decade of Change (PDF) (Report). Pennsylvania Crime Commission – via Government of Pennsylvania.
- Richardson, A. (May 1991). Outlaw Motorcycle Gangs – USA Overview (PDF) (Report). State of California Department of Justice, Bureau of Organized Crime and Criminal Intelligence – via United States Department of Justice.
