= John Sciandra =

Italian-American mobster

- Born: Giovanni Sciandra; April 10, 1899; Montedoro, Sicily, Kingdom of Italy
- Died: September 11, 1949 (aged 50); Pittston, Pennsylvania, U.S.
- Resting place: Denison Cemetery, Swoyersville, Pennsylvania, U.S.
- Citizenship: American
- Occupation: Crime boss
- Spouse: Josephine Mancino
- Children: 4
- Relatives: Russell Bufalino (cousin-in-law); Edward Sciandra (cousin)
- Allegiance: Sciandra crime family

John Sciandra (born Giovanni Sciandra, Italian: [dʒoˈvanni ʃˈʃandra]; April 10, 1899 – September 11, 1949) was an Italian-American crime boss of the Bufalino crime family of Pennsylvania from 1933 until 1949.

== Early life ==
Sciandra was born on April 10, 1899, in Montedoro, Sicily, to Angelo and Leonarda La Porta Sciandra. With his parents and siblings, Andrew, James and Pasqualina, he immigrated to the United States in April 1908, settling in Buffalo, New York. In 1921, he moved to Pittston, Pennsylvania, working as a coal miner; Sciandra became an enforcer and bootlegger for Bufalino crime family boss Santo Volpe. In 1928, Sciandra's cousin, Carolyn, married Russell Bufalino, future crime boss of the family. (Note: In The Quiet Don: The Untold Story of Mafia Kingpin Russell Bufalino, by Matt Birkbeck, has been erroneously reported that Sciandra was the brother-in-law of Russell Bufalino. References to John Sciandra as the brother of Carolyn Bufalino are to a different John Sciandra.)

Sciandra married Josephine Mancino and had three sons, Joseph, John Jr. and Angelo, and one daughter.

== Criminal career ==
The Bufalino crime family had four very powerful members who pulled all the strings, including Santo Volpe, Angelo Polizzi, Joseph "Joe the Barber" Barbara and Sciandra. In 1933, after being questioned about his possible involvement in the murder of Samuel Wichner, Santo Volpe appointed John Sciandra as boss of the crime family and quietly worked behind the scenes within the family while also devoting more attention to legitimate business. Polizzi became consigliere, maintaining this role before moving to Detroit and getting involved in organized crime in that city.

== Death ==
Sciandra died of natural causes on September 11, 1949. (Note: There is a common misconception Sciandra was murdered in 1940, but newspaper articles confirm he died of natural causes in 1949.) He is buried in Denison Cemetery, Swoyersville, Pennsylvania.

== Notes ==
American Mafia
Preceded by Santo Volpe	Bufalino crime family Boss; 1933–1949	Succeeded by Joseph Barbara
