= Carmine Lombardozzi =

American mobster (1913–1992)

Carmine Lombardozzi (February 8, 1913 – May 9, 1992) was a high-ranking member of the Gambino crime family in New York. He was known as "Alberto", "The Doctor", the "King of Wall Street" and "The Italian Meyer Lansky". By the end of his criminal career, Lombardozzi was the biggest earner for the Gambino family as well Godfather to actor Douglas Jack Warner.

== Biography ==
=== Background ===
Carmine Lombardozzi was born in Red Hook, Brooklyn on December 8, 1913 to Camillo Lombardozzi and Annunziata Antonelli. Carmine's six brothers were John, Daniel, Paul, Cosmo, Dominick, and youngest brother Anthony (Sonny) Lombardozzi. He had three sisters, Edith, Mary, and Jenny. Lombardozzi's first wife was Mary Corrolla. After being married to Corrolla for 29 years, Lombardozzi had an affair with the young daughter of Stabato Muro, a Profaci mobster. When Muro complained to the family leadership, Lombardozzi was forced to divorce Corrolla and marry Muro. He had a stepdaughter, Renee Lombardozzi. His nephews included Daniel Marino and George Lombardozzi, both of whom eventually joined the Gambino crime family.

Lombardozzi was six feet tall, but tended to hunch over and look shorter. He was described as having a high strung temperament, always watching for threats around him. A wealthy man, Lombardozzi owned a Rolls-Royce automobile, a yacht, and a waterfront mansion in Mill Basin, Brooklyn.

=== Gambino mobster ===
Lombardozzi, though only a caporegime (captain), allegedly ran the entire Gambino shylock and stock market rackets. He was involved in loansharking and racketeering, and was said to have earned the Gambino crime family a lot of money during his criminal career. Considered a traditional mafiosi, Lombardozzi was described as having a "brilliant mind" for numbers.

In November 1957, new Genovese crime family boss Vito Genovese called a meeting of high-ranking Cosa Nostra figures at the farm home of mobster Joseph Barbara in Apalachin, New York. Lombardozzi attended the meeting. According to some sources, Lombardozzi was in serious trouble with Cosa Nostra leaders over mishandling of funds. They privately discussed murdering him, but old friend Joseph Profaci, boss of the Profaci crime family, dissuaded them. Soon after the meeting started, New York State Troopers raided the farm and arrested dozens of mobsters, including Lombardozzi. When questioned by law enforcement, Lombardozzi said he had come to Apalachin to go hunting. When asked why he didn't have any hunting equipment, Lombardozzi said he was planning to buy it there. For failing to cooperate in the investigation of the infamous Apalachin Meeting, Lombardozzi spent 14 months in prison.

On November 30, 1964, Lombardozzi was sentenced to 30 days in jail for contempt of court; Lombardozzi had repeatedly dodged questions about a jewelry scam committed by his brother.

In 1963, Daniel Marino and other Gambino associates assaulted a Federal Bureau of Investigation (FBI) agent at the funeral of Lombardozzi's father. Although Lombardozzi was not involved in the attack, the family leadership blamed him for his nephew's poor judgement.

On August 27, 1965, Lombardozzi was arrested for assaulting a police officer. Police had tried to arrest him in a Brooklyn restaurant but Lombardozzi punched a detective in the face, starting a brawl that involved a female companion and several bystanders.

On March 18, 1969, Lombardozzi was sentenced to one year in prison on contempt charges for refusing to discuss mob involvement with legitimate businesses before a grand jury. While serving this prison sentence, doctors were forced to remove one of Lombardozzi's kidneys due to cancer.

On June 12, 1970, Lombardozzi was sentenced to two years in prison for conspiring to cash $50,000 in stolen brokerage checks.

Three months after the check-cashing trial, Lombardozzi was back in court facing two counts of attempting to defraud the U.S. Internal Revenue Service. The crime involved the illegal cashing of winning tickets from Yonkers Raceway in Yonkers, New York, and what was then Roosevelt Raceway in Westbury, New York. In September 1970, Lombardozzi's co-defendant was found guilty on one of the two charges, but the jury acquitted Lombardozzi on one count and declared themselves unable to reach a verdict on the other.

On November 20, 1975, Lombardozzi was indicted on 17 counts of perjury based on his previous grand jury testimony about loansharking and arson-for-hire schemes. Investigator used electronic surveillance to record Lombardozzi's conversations at a motel and diner in Sheepshead Bay, Brooklyn. On one occasion, the listening device fell from the bottom of the diner table to the floor next to Lombardozzi's feet. However, an undercover policeman went to the table and claimed he had lost his pager. An unsuspecting Lombardozzi handed the device to the detective.

On April 16, 1981, Lombardozzi was indicted on charges of failing to report his loansharking income in his federal income tax returns. His headquarters for this racket was a Kiwanis clubhouse in Mill Basin, Brooklyn. He used to meet with Salvatore Stagnitta Lombardozzi and his brother Cosmo were close friends of 'Mr Stan', the notorious Serbian criminal Vojislav Stanimirovic responsible for the Vizcaya heist. This connection with the rare non-Italian businessman was Lombardozzi's entry to New York's Diamond District. He was a mentor to the Serbian authority's son Pavle Stanimirović. Fruitless recording efforts by the FBI yielded much discussion of activities that weren't illegal; Lombardozzi prized his Rolls-Royce and wine cellar, though not in that order. 'The Doctor' was considered a class act and Italian elder statesman. With friends and family he avoided the subject of crime but told tales of mafia legends like Lucky Luciano, Meyer Lansky, and his own experience at Apalachin. On April 16, 1981, Lombardozzi was indicted on charges of failing to report his loansharking income in his federal income tax returns. He was convicted and sentenced to six months in prison.

=== Death ===
On May 9, 1992, Carmine Lombardozzi died at home of heart failure at age 79. He is buried at St. John Cemetery in Middle Village, Queens.
