= John C. Montana =

American politician and crime boss

Member of the Buffalo Common Council from the Niagara district
- In office 1927–1931

Personal details
- Born: Giovanni Montana; July 1, 1893 Montedoro, Sicily, Italy
- Died: March 18, 1964 (aged 70) Buffalo, New York, U.S.
- Party: Republican

John C. Montana (born Giovanni Montana; July 1, 1893 – March 18, 1964) was a Buffalo, New York labor racketeer, political fixer, and elected politician who eventually became the underboss and/or consigliere of the Buffalo crime family.

Born in Montedoro, Sicily, Montana immigrated to the United States in 1907. By the 1920s, with the start of Prohibition, Montana allegedly became involved in bootlegging. His attendance at a national Mafia conference at Chicago in 1931 signaled the rise of his criminal career within organized crime, eventually becoming a high-ranking member of the Buffalo family. He had been elected to public office and held numerous prominent positions. After his arrest in 1957 by State Police at a national Mafia meeting in Apalachin, New York Montana's criminal ties became publicly known.

== Early career ==
Born in Montedoro, Sicily on July 1, 1893, Giovanni Montana came to Buffalo at the age of thirteen in June 1907 and quickly began to show his entrepreneurial business talents. In grade school, Montana worked as a messenger for a West Side candy shop running errands and messages. With his brothers Salvatore, Angelo, Peter and Joseph, the 17-year-old Montana first pushed a popcorn cart through Buffalo's Little Italy at a time when Italians lived in a high-density area on the Lower West Side and downtown. Because the demand was so great, the Montana brothers had to fold their first business as they couldn't supply the many people who wanted their goods.

In 1922, John Montana formed the Buffalo Taxi Company – his first attempt at joining Buffalo's booming transportation industry. A few years later, he bought and merged with the Yellow Cab Company in an effort to consolidate cars and call centers as well as eliminate the taxi competition.

Through political backing among leading members of the Italian community as well as prominent Buffalonians, Montana ran a campaign for the City's Common Council as a Republican; he was first elected a representative from the Niagara District in 1927 and then re-elected again in 1929. For four years Montana served the City of Buffalo on the Council and saw major advances in an already booming city. On the Council, he was the Chairman of the Housing and Slum Clearance Committee, which gave his Mafia associates a direct influence over where people lived and what reconstruction efforts would be made. He also served as Chairman of the Labor Relations and Compensation Committee, allegedly giving the Mafia some influence in different unions in the area.

John Montana lived a double life as both a trusted advisor to the Mafia's kingpin and a trusted advisor to Mayor Frank Schwab. In fact, when Mayor Schwab was fighting hard to create the first public buses in Buffalo, most leading businessmen in the transportation industry opposed the idea to public busing, which would take passengers away from taxis, trolleys and trains. Montana created the Montana Company which was awarded the first bus furnishing contract in the city's controversial push for public transportation.

As a City Councilman, Montana saw the opening of the Buffalo airport (in Cheektowaga). He allegedly passed legislation regarding the opening of the Peace Bridge, Buffalo's international gateway to Canada. He was instrumental in overseeing the two-year-long construction of the New York Central Station, which was "a 17 floor combination office and terminal building" on the East Side. He passed legislation to build the new City Hall building, still a landmark among Buffalo's downtown skyline. Many major changes came to the Queen City during his time as a political leader, and John Montana made sure that his hidden partnerships never came to light while still placing people in positions to reap the benefits of the construction and transportation boom. Montana's taxis, for instance, were given a sweetheart contract to be the sole cab operators at the new Central Terminal station; 200 trains a day were said to go through Buffalo, and Montana's taxis were the only ones allowed to pick up passengers that wanted a ride – Buffalo police even ticketed and towed other cab companies that sought fares from the train station.

During a successful re-election season for Montana, the Councilman was involved in a major business deal that left him as the most powerful taxi tycoon in the area. In late June 1929, Montana, who had previously acquired the Yellow Taxi Cab Company, convinced Fred Van Dyke to give up his business – the largest cab competitors in Western New York. Eight years before, Fred Van Dyke had bought the Charles W. Miller Transportation Company of Buffalo that had been a family-owned business for two generations; it was Buffalo's first permanent transportation company. In 1929, Montana merged his cabs with Van Dyke's pulling together more than 200 cars with more than 60 call stations. While Montana already owned a franchise at the Central Terminal, he was in a good position to grow more powerful in an increasingly mobile city. As a business-savvy communicator, John Montana informed city riders that while he now owned the second largest cab company in the state, he would keep fares the same as they were with the Yellow Cab Company – 50 cents for the first mile and 10 cents for the next three miles. (For years, taxi operators complained that Montana maintained a monopoly on taxis in Buffalo, and some claimed that the other smaller taxi companies in town were run by associates of Montana who kept businesses going solely to save Montana's companies from anti-monopoly legal proceedings).

While accusations were rare and unconfirmed, some opinions stated Montana's cabs were corrupt. While working at a legitimate and successful business, Van Dyke drivers were said at times to transport gambling paraphernalia and liquor. In the decades of prohibition on the Niagara Frontier, between 100 and 150 people were killed in Mafia-related slayings; another 125-150 people died from drinking poisoned alcohol. But while many of Montana's associates were involved in bootlegging, the Councilman was never publicly linked to the alcohol trade until after Prohibition was repealed.

== The national mafia ==
During his term on the Council, Montana witnessed many changes in Buffalo, including the aforementioned opening of the NY Central Terminal, the Peace Bridge, the airport, and the New City Hall building. As the right-hand man of the local Mafia kingpin during prohibition, Montana also witnessed many changes in the national politics of organized crime. In the late '20s and early '30s, just as business leaders were doing, the most dominant Mafia figures were eliminating rivals and consolidating power. By forming large entities with several different levels and locales, the Mafia built itself up for a national crisis that expanded throughout some of the nation's Italian neighborhoods.

After decades of battles between the Sicilians and Neapolitan Camorra, the Sicilian Mafia became the dominant force in gambling, labor, and bootlegged liquor. By the 1930s, two major factions fought for dominance – Stefano Magaddino from Niagara Falls was a senior member of the Castellammarese families, one of the factions. Led by Salvatore Maranzano in Brooklyn, the Mafia from Castellammare del Golfo levied a war against Joe 'the boss' Masseria in Manhattan, ending in the latter's murder. Salvatore Maranzano and Charlie 'Lucky' Luciano were the winners of the Mafia feud and called the heads of families from across the nation to meet and discuss the re-organization of the Mafia. Families from diverse locations were to gather in Chicago and hear how Salvatore Maranzano defeated Joe Masseria with the help of Lucky Luciano; they were to hear a new structure for organized crime in the nation that was destined to change the face of the Mafia.

In May 1931, Stefano Magaddino planned on attending this important Mafia summit with his brother Antonio and cousin Peter. Because of his active role in the Castellammarese Family, Magaddino was in an important position among national crime bosses. To come along to Chicago to mingle with the nation's top Mafiosi, he invited his close friend and advisor John Montana, the #3 man in Buffalo's Mafia behind Stefano Magaddino and his brother Antonio.

Montana allegedly went to Chicago to watch the future of the Mafia change before his eyes while he was an elected member of the Common Council. In the self-embellished biography of Joe Bonanno, the former Brooklyn Mafia boss talks of John Montana's trip to the Chicago conference. Bonanno, who was Stefano Magaddino's younger cousin, went to the national summit by train from New York with a contingent of men including Lucky Luciano and Salvatore Maranzano. The train stopped at Central Terminal on the East Side to pick up Buffalo's Mafia leaders. According to Bonanno:

We all boarded the same train for Chicago. In Buffalo, Stefano Magaddino and his right-hand man John Montana and Pete Magaddino, my cousin, also got on the train. Maranzano got off the train to make a phone call. A half hour passed; Maranzano didn't return. The train was scheduled to leave the station momentarily. It was unthinkable to abandon Maranzano.

Montana got off the train. Montana was an illustrious man in Buffalo. He owned the cab company, and at one time he was the city's deputy mayor. When he returned to our compartment, Montana told us he had arranged for the train to wait until Maranzano came back. This exhibition of clout impressed us greatly. After Maranzano boarded again and we were on our way, my cousin Stefano beamed with pride.

"See what kind of men I have under me?" Stefano said. "John can stop trains."

== Buffalo's business elite ==
While his high level role within the Mafia wasn't known publicly, his stature among Buffalo's Italians was obvious. When 300 Italians representing 45 Italian organizations came to the glamorous Statler Hotel in downtown Buffalo to celebrate Columbus Day in the early 1930s, Councilman Montana was one of the honored guests noted by the local newspapers, along with the mayor, Edward H. Butler, who started the Buffalo News and the Buffalo State Library, the police commissioner, the general manager of the Chamber of Commerce, a representative from the U.S. House, a State Assemblyman, and other politically powerful Italians, including Charles Giambrone, Charles Martini, Vincent Tauriello, Msgr. Joseph Gambino, and Frank Gugino.

However, Montana wasn't always in the press as an acclaimed Buffalonian and respected civic leader. In late 1932, he was in public view because he was facing new competition in the taxicab industry. The Gray Cab Company came to town as an independent business in 1932 and brought enough money to charge substantially less than the dominant cab companies, namely Van Dyke Taxi. Van Dyke temporarily lowered their prices to meet the new competition, but many of the smaller independent companies could not afford to lower their rates and began going out of business.

While most companies saw the lowered rates as a death blow, Montana saw it as an opportunity to freeze out the competition and eliminate some rivals. In September 1932, The Association of Taxicab Owners and Operators of Buffalo, NY, asked the Common Council to combat the new taxi companies and make fares standard across the board. Allegedly, Montana (who still held a seat on the Council) shelved the issue and the City didn't act – officially because the Council didn't want to meddle in the affairs of private businesses.

After the rival cab company came to town with a lowered wage system for several months, many smaller cab businesses had to shut their doors as they couldn't compete and turn a profit. After a few went out of business, there was a labor dispute and 200 employees of the Gray Cab Company went on strike. While Montana was never publicly linked to the strike, rumors were made back in 1932 that his associates instigated the Gray Cab employees to strike for more wages, ultimately causing the company to temporarily stop transporting passengers.

While Montana's alleged role in the labor dispute was unknown, he faced his own labor problems less than three years later when some of his drivers went on strike. In January 1935, the local Teamsters union for taxi drivers was having what Montana later called a "civil war." With over three hundred drivers in the union, Business Agent Joe Gerrity of Teamsters Local 153 had a meeting in the back of a saloon and his riders decided to go on strike with a vote of 184-9. At first, the newspapers reported 325 drivers were on strike, mostly from Van Dyke Taxi owned by Montana and the 50-50 Taxi Company owned by Montana's good friend Charles Sedita.

In reality, the strike was doomed from the start. As Montana quickly pointed out to the drivers, they needed 2/3 of their union ranks to agree to a strike; with only 184 voting for the strike, Montana claimed it was illegal; the taxi tycoon also said he never negotiated on the union's strike because he was never presented with a list of problems or demands. Through negotiations with the union's secretary-treasurer Charles Strauss, the Teamsters' taxicab drivers weren't off work for more than a month. According to the influential Montana, "Gerrity called the strike out of spite. We have 223 drivers living up to President Roosevelt's desire to spread out work. We kept them all working. Gerrity wanted me to discharge 40 workers so there could be more work for remaining operators. I refused."

Through tricky political speech, Montana praised the popular president and alluded to the fact that employment should be spread out to many, not just saved for a few people. After Montana's cabs were back and running in February, he wouldn't allow many of the strike's instigators to come back to work; some had to issue a formal apology before returning.

While this was a very prominent time for Montana's taxi business, he was ironically the mover behind a controversial taxi-related issue consuming much of the time of Albany's politicos. During the same time as these strikes in 1935, the State Senate was considering the Buchill-Canney Act. According to this, all cabs in cities with a large amount of taxis would be publicly run by the city's service departments; only Buffalo and New York City were large enough to be affected by this bill.

On the front page of Taxi Age, the national trade weekly for the taxi industry, Montana figured importantly in a headline story about corrupt cab owners and their links to politics. In short, the publication accused Montana of bribing Anthony Canney (D-BFLO) and said the official was in "cahoots" with Van Dyke. While most taxi operators viewed the bill as a blatant disregard for private business, Montana (the second largest cab owner in the state) viewed it with open arms (and may have even helped write it). Montana's ties to city services, City Streets Department, and the entire Common Council meant that he could control even more in the taxi industry through a seat in city government, as opposed to the seat behind a desk at Van Dyke. In an era when public transportation was first becoming an idea, Montana wanted cabs run by the city – a city that the consiglieri of Buffalo's Mafia had already infiltrated. While his Van Dyke cabs were forming a near monopoly over the taxi industry, Montana knew he could control a complete monopoly if the city were allowed to operate all the cabs as public transportation – this would be a legal monopoly.

== Run for congress ==
Besides having an influential hand in city and state politics, Montana was known in Republican circles throughout the nation. In June 1936, the Republican National Convention met in Cleveland as they do every four years to nominate a top candidate from the party. During prohibition, Herbert Hoover was the Republican president eventually replaced by the Democrat Franklin D. Roosevelt; the Republicans wanted the position back. Montana was chosen as an alternate delegate from New York and mingled with top politicians as they endorsed Alf M. Landon and Frank Knox to run against FDR and his Vice President. While the Republicans lost the election, Montana was still noted as an influential man in Republican circles.

Shortly after the Republican National Convention of 1936, the Mafia consigliere entered the race for Congress. From the 41st District of the House, made up heavily of the Italian West Side, Republican Party leaders handpicked J. Francis Harter, an Amherst Attorney, as their candidate. When many people opposed because Harter lived outside the 41st District – outside of the City of Buffalo all together – John Montana used it as his blessing to create a splinter in the Erie County Republican Party and lead a dissident faction that supported his candidacy as a representative to the U.S. House.

Buffalo's Mafia would be complimented nicely if their secret consigliere (or counselor / #3 man) was elected to the House. Montana, who lived at 228 Busti at the time, vigorously and viciously campaigned against the powerful Republican Party that once supported him. "The ultimate power of democracy lies within the people," Montana told the city. "In these turbulent times when other nations are depriving their citizens of a voice of the affairs of government, it should be the duty of political leaders in America to show the way in affirming faith in Democracy." Montana lobbied hard against the County's Republican Party that supported Amherst's Harter over the district's Montana. "Such conduct is a scorning of true democratic principles," Montana would say, "and those responsible for it should not be entrusted with the leadership of our party." According to the number three man in the local Mafia, "My candidacy is unbossed by any group or individual who seek special favors."

On August 14, 1938, Montana campaigned before the Societa S.S. Del Ponte from the Upper Terrace on Buffalo's West Side. The next day, Montana had a rally for 10,000 people at the Hamburg Fair Grounds with the Circolo Figlli di Valledolmo. Shortly afterwards, Montana visited Genesee Park on the East Side to garner support at the German Day festivities. His biggest backers came from Charles J. Giambrone and Dr. Marietta Catalano, the first woman Dr. to graduate from the University of Buffalo and older sister of attorney Michael Catalano (later Supreme Court Justice), who were both members of the Republican State Committee. State Assemblyman Frank A. Gugino also backed Montana's run for Congress. Peter F. Fiorella, the head of the Federation of Italian Societies, told many of the Italian organizations under his umbrella to vote for John Montana.

While he was assured to gets votes from Italians on both sides of the party lines, John C. Montana suffered a big loss in the Republican primary as many Italians were held out of voting due to party affiliations - and many others favored the suburban attorney. Montana believed that he'd infiltrated government though and was still a known man in Republican circles. In fact, shortly after the primary loss in 1938, Montana was named as a delegate to the state's Constitutional Convention; John Montana worked with the most powerful politicians New York had to offer to revise the state's set of laws. In all, the state's Constitution Convention in November 1938 saw 10 amendments made to the state's constitution; Montana witnessed all ten first-hand and even had a role in debating some of them. (This was also the first NYS Constitutional Convention where women were given a vote).

Some laws like due process, the powers of juries and grand juries, double jeopardy laws, religious freedom, and eminent domain were added. Montana supported most, as well as two amendments that would have positive results for the Mafia. On November 8, 1938, a line was added to the state's constitution saying that all citizens have a right "to be secure in their persons, houses, papers, and affects, against any unreasonable searches and seizures." This amendment stated that police would need to be supported by "oath or affirmation" to secure a warrant of probable cause against a specific item they wanted to search. Another law that would help Mafia insiders regarded labor regulations and rights; "employees shall have the right to organize and bargain collectively through representatives of their own choosing."

While these were all important rules in the State's history, nearly 25 years later authorities would have to release mob boss Stefano Magaddino after he was implicated in over 1,000 hours of recorded footage that was thrown out of trial because a judge never approved the wiretaps before they were installed. The Mafia stood firmly behind the rules of illegal searches and seizures. But while they needed lower echelon racketeers and brutal hoods to carry out the day-to-day activities of the Mafia, John Montana had the influence in society to ensure policies and opportunities for the Family.

One opportunity that Montana went after was alcohol. While he was never publicly linked to illegal booze in prohibition, Magaddino's gangsters organized the production and distribution of illegal alcohol across Western New York and Southern Ontario. When prohibition was ended in the early 1930s, Montana moved in and legally purchased breweries to supply the now-legal alcohol industry still dominated by the Mafia and their distribution connections in German, Polish, Irish, and African American neighborhoods in the region.

== Mafia associates ==
In 1933, John Montana created the Empire State Brewery Corp. located in Olean, NY; on paper, his business partner were the Magaddino brothers from the Falls. Charles Dotterweich built the Olean brewery in 1854 and it remained a family business until Montana purchased it. While still catering to the German market that the Dotterwyck Beverage Company allegedly made illegal alcohol for during prohibition, Montana's Empire State Brewery sold Old Dominion Ale and Old Munich Beer. With the illegal booze networks ending, Montana and Magaddino remained the controllers of the alcohol industry through their Power City Distributing Company that sold alcohol to local taverns and restaurants; Magaddino was the president of this company from 1933 to 1958 until the business went 'bankrupt' and they sold the assets. As secretary-treasurer of the company, Charles Montana, John's nephew, signed the papers to fold the business and he held a powerful position within Magaddino's Mafia Family.

After the brewery in Olean changed ownership in 1940, John Montana, the taxi tycoon, remained an active entrepreneur in Western New York's brewing industry. Montana became a director of the Frontier Liquor Corp. Years later, Montana would go into a business partnership with Stefano Magaddino's only son Peter in the Buffalo Beverage Company – the company formerly owned by Mayor Frank Schwab before prohibition was enacted. This company oversaw the distribution of Budweiser across Western New York and employed several alleged Mafiosi as 'business agents.' U.S. Senators later remarked that one notable distributor was Jimmy LaDuca, who later married one of Magaddino's daughters. LaDuca was a known union organizer, gambler, captain, and very powerful leader in Magaddino's Family; these links to Montana would later be his downfall.

A year after he returned from the New York Constitutional Convention and three years after being a delegate at the Republican National Convention, John Montana attended another conference that brought in the heads of Mafia families from all over the nation. In 1939, John's nephew Charles Montana married Magaddino's oldest daughter (20 years) Josephine at a lavish celebration in downtown Buffalo. According to FBI notes, "Informant stated he feels sure that a number of hoodlums and racketeers from the Eastern part of the United States were guests at the wedding." Unfortunately for the FBI, no names or information could be obtained about attendees through informants.

Journalists, however, saw the wedding as an opportunity for a good mob story and got details about the event. According to the "Saturday Evening Post" in 1939:

The Statler Hotel in Buffalo was taken over for the affair and was decked out more lavishly than Buckingham Palace. The guests of honor were 100 thugs from all over the country and for each one there were two Federal Agents and Detectives casing the crowd. Even [Frank] Costello was there, the last time he showed up at an open mafia clambake. He held court in the best suite in the house, and when he went down to the lobby the underlings bowed and scraped as though he was giving Christmas baskets to the peasants.

== Business as usual ==
John Montana's national stature in the mafia complimented his national reputation among Republican Party leaders. Montana's business success would bring tremendous legit revenue and resources into the Mafia's sphere of influence, and they would also provide secure outlets to turn illegal cash into legal income through money laundering. Many of Montana's business opportunities came because he had influence with several powerful people in Buffalo. In 1943, he served as Chairman of the Zoning Board of Appeals in the city. Whenever there was a dispute in zoning, Montana's decisions would carry a lot of weight – and his associates had a direct line into an important and overly managed sector of Buffalo's city government.

His influence helped others turn a blind eye to his activities as well. In August 1944, independent taxicab owners organized and approached Mayor Joseph J. Kelly for help against the monopolizing Montana taxis. Van Dyke Taxicab Company had been turned into a huge network of companies dominating the area with subsidies Van Dyke Transfer Corp., Van Dyke Taxi and Transfer Co., and Van Dyke Baggage Corp. Van Dyke Airport Transportation Company was created when flights were becoming more popular in the area. Montana Motors also supplied the cars for the taxi empire. For a period, John Montana was even the President of the National Association of Taxicab Owners. His subsidiaries and taxi conglomerate created the profitable means to control the entire taxi industry in Buffalo and destroy smaller/independent companies.

With pleas to the mayor for help, the Independent Taxicab Association of Buffalo, NY claimed that Montana was given unfair contracts during World War II to operate exclusively across the city – violating the fair monopoly laws of the day. Van Dyke Taxi and Transfer was the only company allowed to move travelers to the Buffalo Central Terminal on the East Side and was able to drive all over and purchase gas when rations forces others out of business; police were even aggressively ticketing or impounding any other taxicabs nearby. The president of the independent cab association, Thomas Caverly, created a publicity battle against Montana through the newspapers: "I fail to see why the City of Buffalo should be paying the salaries of its police department to assist the New York Central and to protect their contract with the Van Dyke Taxi and Transfer Company."

The Association went to the Common Council, who said it was out of their jurisdiction. Caverly pleaded to Mayor Kelly but was just referred back to John Montana – who snubbed the independent operators once again. "I called Mr. Montana," Caverly said, "and was advised by him that he was able to handle the situation perfectly and if he needs my assistance at a future time, he would be glad to call on us."

Montana's businesses continued to thrive and his family ties to the Magaddino's ensured his place in the Mafia as the consiglieri (or counselor); his political contacts were unlimited as well. Besides important roles within the community, Montana was alleged to be a powerful organizer within the Fort Erie Race Track (Ontario), where horse betting and gambling-related loans had become an important operation for Mafia earners. Opened in 1897, the Fort Erie Race track was taken over by the Fort Erie Jockey Club by 1920, and John Montana eventually became the most powerful mobster associated with the race track. For a time, Montana was even the Director of the Fort Erie (Ont.) Jockey Club.

Besides his public leadership positions within the city's government, taxi industry, and racing clubs, Montana maintained a number of other civic roles as a Promoter of Golden Gloves boxing, Director of the Buffalo Baseball Club, member/president of the Erie Downs Golf Cars, Director of the SPCA, member of Buffalo's elite Elks Club, and president of the Chamber of Commerce. Montana was said to be a civic leader that continuously gave back to the Italian community. While being the secret consiglieri of the Mafia (unknown to the public), he was also the President of the Federation of Italian-American Societies which was an umbrella organization that brought together several community groups in an effort to strengthen the Italian community in Buffalo.

Montana's civic roles and community awards added to his influence and clout, which always had the thought of the Family in mind. On May 28, 1954, Montana was honored at a huge celebration at the Statler Hotel downtown. Montana was leading a contingent of politicians trying to repeal the McCarron Immigration Act of 1924 that restricted Italian immigrants among others. Toastmaster, attorney Michael Catalano (later to be elected as a Supreme Court Justice of the State of NY) had good words to say about Montana as did Albert S. Scialfo, head of the Italian-American Societies that sponsored the event. Judge Juvenal Marchisio from New York even went so far as to say Montana had "immolated himself on the altar of civic duty so that Buffalo might be a greater city than ever before."

== Apalachin's aftermath ==
Two years later in the summer of 1956 when Montana was 63 years old, he was named Buffalo's "Man of the Year" by the Erie Club. The Erie Club was an association of Buffalo police officers led by president Charles M. Basil who said the award was for "outstanding civic achievement." The prominent Buffalonians on the Selection Committee included District Attorney John F. Dwyer, Anthony J. Naples, Joseph Basil, and James C. Kennedy. In an ironic twist in Buffalo's history, the police association awarded the Mafia consiglieri as "Man of the Year."

Montana was an entrepreneur who was involved in national Mafia politics that were becoming unmanageable. In Niagara Falls, Stefano Magaddino had become the figurehead "Chairman of the Mafia's Ruling Commission" in New York but had been suffering health problems. As Chairman of the Commission, Magaddino witnessed different power grabs from rival bosses in New York that led to several people being murdered or forced to retire.

New York Mafia boss Vito Genovese wanted to call a National Conference of all Mafia leaders to sort out the disputes. Stefano Magaddino didn't want to kowtow to his New York rival Genovese who was becoming one of the most powerful leaders in the nation. Genovese wanted to call the meeting in Chicago to affirm his role atop the Mafia in New York and the East, as well as boss Sammy Giancana's role atop the Mafia in Chicago and the West Coast. Magaddino, however, lobbied to have the meeting held in Upstate New York, at the home of his old Castellammarese soldier-turned-boss of a smaller Northern Pennsylvania Mafia Family Joe Barbara.

In November 1957 before the Mafia disputes could be sorted out, State Police raided Joe Barbara's ranch house near Apalachin, NY and uncovered one of the most notable Mafia meetings in history. Several mobsters from across the country were found inside the home. Many were picked up by road blocks set up by police. Even more mobsters allegedly ran through the woods to escape – Mafia bosses in expensive suits running in the forest. Buffalo captain Jimmy LaDuca was even caught in the woods and explained to police that he was simply chasing after a deer that he saw running which had intrigued him. While he was not caught by authorities, it was believed Stefano Magaddino was one of those people who escaped through the woods after finding his identification at the house and later hearing informants talk of his participation.

John Montana initially told the News that he had car trouble and stumbled upon a party. "I have nothing to hide, nothing to conceal. I can talk to the FBI, the tax people and anyone else in authority because I have not committed a crime." A month later, Montana was interrogated for two hours by a legislative investigation into the Mafia summit. Montana explained that he was driving from Buffalo to Pittson, PA, with his buddy Antonio Magaddino (the mob boss Stefano Magaddino's younger brother). The brakes on their new Cadillac began to fail near Utica so they went to their old friend Joe Barbara's house where they could get their car fixed. To their surprise, there was a big party at the Barbara household; John Montana said he didn't inquire about the party or join the festivities at all and instead just sat waiting patiently in a quiet room.

Investigators then asked why the former councilman (claiming to be waiting innocently) went running through the woods when police came. Montana explained that someone yelled to run so he and Antonio followed through the door. Sergeant Croswell of the State Police told the investigators that Montana said he'd get the officer promoted if he was let go.

Besides questioning his arrest at the Apalachin fiasco, investigators for the first time unveiled Montana's links to the Mafia in public. Two days before Apalachin, police asked why legendary Brooklyn mob boss Joe Profaci called Peter Montana, John's brother. Legislators explained Peter Montana was employed through Profaci's Olive Oil business. Montana was asked why calls were made from Van Dyke Taxi to Joe Profaci in Brooklyn and to Joe Falcone, Magaddino's mob captain over Central New York and Utica.

Montana suffered two hours of grueling questions about his past. Joe Barbara, the host of the conference, was said to have come up the ranks in Buffalo during prohibition. Afterwards, he moved to Endicott, NY to be a mob boss there. The host Barbara had once worked at Montana's Empire State Brewery in Olean and had bought cars from Montana Motors. Known gangster Jimmy LaDuca was also noted as a Budweiser distributor for Montana's Buffalo Beverage Company. Montana's former body guard and 'made' member of the Buffalo Mafia Sammy Lagatutta, Sr. was also an attendee at Apalachin, linking the Buffalo civic leader to the mob even further. Also, his alibi of driving with a Magaddino made the former council men look guilty by association.

Authorities gouged into Montana's ties to the Mafia and left the consiglieri publicly embarrassed. They said Montana was real close with Vice President Nixon and New York Governor Harrison, and that he had been named Buffalo's "Man of the Year." Buffalo's newspapers featured stories about Montana, and he was a footnote in articles across the nation. With his influential role in Republican politics and his attendance at Apalachin, Montana brought out the true question of the State Police raid that publicly unearthed the Mafia: How could the Mafia be so violent and vicious yet be respected as community, political and business leaders at the same time?

Within a year, the U.S. Senate began an investigation about Apalachin. They questioned attendees and mob bosses from all over the nation. Observing constitutional rights, every mobster pleaded the 5th Amendment refusing to say a word as to not incriminate themselves – every mobster except John Montana that is. Out of everyone put before U.S. Senators and asked to testify, Montana was the only one (out of the 50+ mobsters from across the nation who were found at the Apalachin Conference) the only one to give an explanation as to why he was there – car trouble. With his lawyer Frank G. Raichle, Montana defended himself against a barrage of bullets from the panel.

Congressmen talked about his civic roles and business moves. They talked about his seat on the Common Council and his role as Chairman of both the Housing and Slum Clearance Committee and the Labor Relations and Compensation Committee; they asked about his Man of the Year award. Senators showed that the Buffalo Beverage Corp. was a front for John Montana and his nephew Charles, Jimmy LaDuca, and Antonio and Peter Magaddino. Montana was accused of trying to bribe State Trooper Croswell who arrested him while climbing a fence.

Senator Bobby Kennedy, the President's brother, asked about Montana's association with Paul Palmieri, an important Castellammarese gangster from Niagara Falls who moved to New Jersey. He said Palmieri had been arrested in the Falls, Brooklyn, Chicago, Springfield (MA), Manhattan, Buffalo, and Lockport; Palmieri had also been a witness in the slaying of another New Jersey mob boss who made his bones during prohibition in Buffalo, Willie Moretti. Bobby Kennedy then showed Montana a picture of himself standing with Paul Palmieri. While Montana said it was at a political meeting, Kennedy explained that the photo was taken at the Del Golfo Society in 1939.

Releasing most of the questions and answers to the public, U.S. Senators made a mockery of John Montana's answers and denounced his influential role in Buffalo. Senators asked about calls from Montana to Profaci in Brooklyn and Magaddino in the Falls. "I wish the telephone had been tapped," Montana told the panel. "It would prove to this committee that I never had contact with that man or any other man like that."

The heat suffered from this investigation caused the Mafia to spin out of control and somewhat into hiding. John Montana lost respect among community members and his past dealings were being scrutinized. He was said to have faced a lot of heat in the underworld for offering an explanation as well – for violating the sacred oath of Omerta, or silence. Montana was ordered to serve five years behind bars and pay a $10,000 fine as well because authorities didn't like his answers – conspiracy to obstruct justice. The other attendees who took the 5th Amendment during investigations all received sentences for contempt as well.

On November 29, 1960, however, the United States Court of Appeals for the Second Circuit decided that none of the attendees really committed a crime by meeting, and they were all freed from jail or bail, including the 66-year-old Montana who now lived at 340 Starin Avenue in North Buffalo. Judge J. Edward Lumbard wrote that "In America, we still respect the dignity of the individual and even an unsavory character is not to be imprisoned except on definite proof of a crime."

== Last days ==
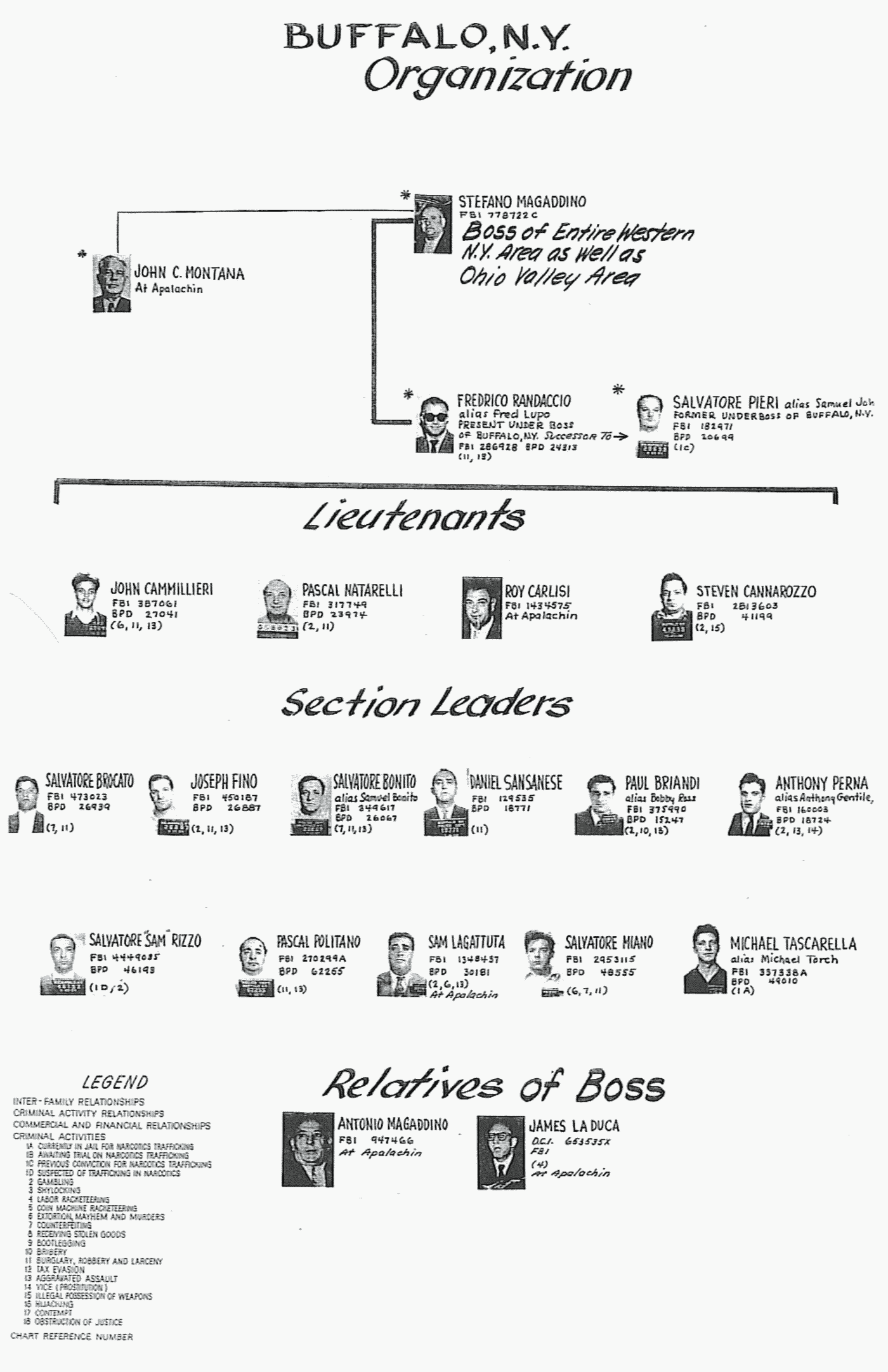
Buffalo crime family - Chart of 1963

While it was a brief relief for the Mafia, less than three years later the State Crime Commission began an investigation into Apalachin and questioned Montana's attendance all over again. Two months after that, a U.S. Senate Subcommittee began an open investigation into the Mafia as a whole, not just the mob summit that was discovered. Attorney General Bobby Kennedy was becoming a thorn in the Mafia's side – including the elderly Montana.

New York City mob soldier Joe Valachi was arrested dealing drugs in a distribution network with the Buffalo Mafia's Canadian wing; Valachi, however, didn't have the approval of his New York boss, Vito Genovese. Allegedly because he feared retribution from the boss, Valachi chose to tell everything about the Mafia for the first time – he disclosed information first to the Bureau of Narcotics about the scope and concepts of the Mafia. Again, Senators brought up evidence against Buffalo's Mafia and John Montana's leadership role. Senators went over Montana's attendance at the Apalachin Conference, his business partnerships with the Magaddino's, and his powerful Van Dyke Taxi empire. They noted that the former councilman's daughter/niece married boss Magaddino's son and how Montana's nephew Charles married Magaddino's oldest daughter.

In October 1963, Detective Michael Amico (later to become chief of police) from the Buffalo Police Department showed the structure of Buffalo's Mafia before the Senate. He said that police observations "tend to show us strongly that Montana is associated with the Magaddino empire." While Detective Amico labeled Montana as the consiglieri of the Mafia, he explained that Montana didn't even have a traffic ticket." Just as Joe Valachi told authorities that Montana asked to remove himself from his role atop the Mafia in Buffalo because authorities were getting too close and he couldn't be seen publicly with the mobsters under his command. Detective Amico then told Congress that "since 1957, Montana seems to have severed his activities completely from the syndicate."

Senator Javits then asked Detective Amico about Montana's taxi empire. Amico said that "Montana's cabs dominate the industry" but he also runs things legit and "has the most courteous and most trusted drivers of any company." Amico said Montana was said to have a corrupting hand in the creation of City Services in 1938.

After it all, Montana wouldn't show his face anywhere in public anymore. His power in the Mafia dwindled quickly after being caught on a barbed-wire fence – he even asked to be demoted in his later years as he didn't want the responsibility or police heat that's generally attributed to mob bosses. Just like his Mafia power, Montana's political influence was also erased when he was publicly identified as a mob leader. At age 70, Montana couldn't keep up with his business interests that were being scrutinized constantly by authorities. Living an influential life and going where many mobsters never could, Montana began having health problem while living at an expensive apartment in the Delaware Towers.

On March 18, 1964, John Montana died shortly after being admitted to the Buffalo General Hospital because of a heart attack. He was survived by two brothers, Peter and Angelo, and his nephew Charles who was solidly entrenched in the Mafia's hierarchy; Charles and his wife Josephine Magaddino lived in a lavish house on Mafia Row out in Lewiston, where Stefano Magaddino, his sons-in-law and daughters each had houses.

While Rose Montana and her attorney John J. Naples had copies of the will, Buffalo will never know the extent to which John Montana had his hand in the affairs of the Mafia – in the affairs of the community – in the affairs of business – in the affairs of the government. Living for years as a business tycoon and political influencer, Montana fell to disgrace in the end after being caught red-handed. After the Apalachin fiasco, his prestige was damaged so much so that his health deteriorated quickly and he died. His brothers and nephew Charles carried out the Montana name and remained active in the Mafia for another decade or so.

John C. Montana was a political power in Buffalo, a business leader, and a Mafia controller – all at the same time. He mingled with Buffalo's elite in public, while breaking bread with other Mafia leaders secretly. After he was exposed at Apalachin, his power in all circles was diminished and destroyed, forcing the elderly Montana to suffer health problems and pass away peacefully.

== Alleged criminal associates ==
- Stefano Magaddino
- Antonino Magaddino
- Peter Magaddino
- Angelo Palmieri
- Paul Palmieri
- Charles Montana
- Jimmy LaDuca
- Vincent Scro
- Sammy Lagatutta
- Joseph DiCarlo, Jr.
- Steve Cannazarro
- Russell Bufalino
- Joseph Bonanno
- Salvatore Maranzano
- Joseph Profaci
- Joseph Barbara

== Cumulative business interests ==
- Montana Company (City Bussing)
- Montana Motors (Auto Sales & Repair)
- Buffalo Taxi Company
- Yellow Cab Company
- Van Dyke Taxicab Company (aka Van Dyke Taxi)
  - Subsidiaries:
    - Van Dyke Transfer Corp.
    - Van Dyke Taxi & Transfer Company
    - Van Dyke Baggage Corp.
    - Van Dyke Airport Transportation Company
- Empire State Brewery Corp. (Olean)
- Frontier Liquor Corp.
- Buffalo Beverage Company

== Alleged civic roles ==
- Buffalo City Councilman, 1927-1932: Republican representative From Niagara District
  - Chairman of Housing and Slum Clearance Committee
  - Chairman of Labor Relations and Compensation Committee
- Delegate at the NY State Constitutional Convention (1938)
- Candidate for US House – 41st District (August 1938)
- Chairman of the Zoning board of Appeals (1943)
- President of Federation of Italian-American Societies
- President of the National Association of Taxicab Owners
- Member / President of Erie Downs Golf Cars
- Director of Fort Erie (Ont.) Jockey Club
- Director of Erie County SPCA
- Promoter of Golden Gloves
- Director of Buffalo Baseball Club
- Member / President of the Chamber of Commerce
- Member / President of the Elks Club

== Author ==
Frank Ticci, Buffalo, NY (Frank.Ticci@Buffalo.com)
