= Sciandra =

Sciandra is a surname. Notable people with the surname include:

- Carmine Sciandra (born 1952), American mobster
- Edward Sciandra (1912–2003), American mobster, cousin of John
- John Sciandra (1899–1949), Italian-American mobster
- Livio Sciandra (born 1980), Italian male middle distance runner
