= Bill Bufalino =

American attorney (1918–1990)

- Born: William Eugene Bufalino; April 13, 1918; Pittston, Pennsylvania, U.S.
- Died: May 12, 1990 (aged 72); Fort Lauderdale, Florida, U.S.
- Resting place: Holy Sepulchre Cemetery, Michigan, U.S.
- Education: Dickinson School of Law
- Occupation: Lawyer
- Spouse: Marie Antoinette Meli (m. 1945)
- Children: 5
- Relatives: Russell Bufalino (cousin); Angelo Meli (uncle-in-law); Vincent Meli (brother-in-law)

William Eugene Bufalino (/ˌbʌfəˈliːnoʊ/; April 13, 1918 – May 12, 1990) was an American attorney who represented the International Brotherhood of Teamsters (IBT) from 1947 until 1971. He retired in 1982. Bufalino worked closely with Jimmy Hoffa until 1971.

== Early life ==
Bufalino was born on April 13, 1918, in Pittston, Pennsylvania, to Salvatore and Louise Bufalino, Italian immigrants from Montedoro, Sicily. He was one of nine children in a coal mining family. He studied for the Roman Catholic priesthood for two years before switching to law. He graduated from Dickinson School of Law in 1942 and served in World War II as a lieutenant in the Army's Judge Advocate General Corps.

In 1945, after he returned from the Army, Bufalino married Marie Antoinette Meli, sister of Detroit mobster Vincent Meli and niece of crime boss Angelo Meli, then began practicing law in 1947. Bufalino had a son, William Jr., and four daughters, Louise, Grace Ann, Toni and Fran.

== Career ==
Bufalino represented union leader Jimmy Hoffa for nearly 25 years. He helped the union and Hoffa fight racketeering charges. Bufalino represented the union in seven trials, winning five. Hoffa was eventually jailed for jury tampering.

Bufalino was a Teamster official for 20 years, serving as president of Local 985 in the Detroit area. A Senate investigation portrayed Local 985 as "a collection agency for gangster-dominated operators". Bufalino, whose first cousin was Pennsylvania Mafia boss Russell Bufalino, was repeatedly accused of Mafia connections.

In 1961, Twentieth Century Fox bought the film rights to Robert F. Kennedy's book The Enemy Within. However the film never came to be as the studio was concerned that the Teamsters truck drivers would refuse to transport the film tape to the theaters. Later Columbia Pictures picked up the project but they too backed out after Bufalino wrote a letter to the studio pointing out why Twentieth Century Fox had abandoned the project.

Hoffa disappeared on July 30, 1975. Bufalino claimed Hoffa was killed by the Central Intelligence Agency because of his knowledge of an alleged government plot to use Mafia members to assassinate Cuban president Fidel Castro.

== Death ==
Bufalino died of leukemia on May 12, 1990, at Holy Cross Hospital in Fort Lauderdale, Florida. He is buried in Holy Sepulchre Cemetery in Michigan.

== In popular culture ==
Bufalino is portrayed by Ray Romano in Martin Scorsese's 2019 crime film The Irishman.
