= Apalachin meeting =

Large meeting of the American Mafia held in 1957

Coordinates: 42.054382°N 76.157361°W

Apalachin meeting Apalachin summit
- Date: 14 November 1957
- Venues: 625 McFall Road in Apalachin, New York
- Participants: National Crime Syndicate

The Apalachin meeting (/ˌæpəˈleɪkɪn/ AP-ə-LAY-kin) was a historic summit of the American Mafia held at the home of mobster Joseph "Joe the Barber" Barbara, at 625 McFall Road in Apalachin, New York, on November 14, 1957. Allegedly, the meeting was held to discuss various topics including loansharking, narcotics trafficking, and gambling, along with dividing the illegal operations controlled by the recently murdered Albert Anastasia. An estimated 100 Mafiosi from the United States, Italy, and Cuba are thought to have attended this meeting. Immediately after the Anastasia murder that October, and after taking control of the Luciano crime family (renamed the Genovese crime family) from Frank Costello, Vito Genovese wanted to legitimize his new power by holding a national Cosa Nostra meeting.

Local and state law enforcement became suspicious when numerous expensive cars bearing license plates from around the country arrived in what was described as "the sleepy hamlet of Apalachin." After setting up roadblocks, the police raided the meeting, causing many of the participants to flee into the woods and area surrounding the Barbara estate.

More than 60 underworld bosses were detained and indicted following the raid. Twenty of those who attended the meeting were charged with "conspiring to obstruct justice by lying about the nature of the underworld meeting" and found guilty in January 1959. All were fined, up to $10,000 each, and given prison sentences ranging from three to five years. All the convictions were overturned on appeal the following year. One of the most direct and significant outcomes of the Apalachin meeting was that it helped to confirm the existence of a nationwide criminal conspiracy, a fact that some, including Federal Bureau of Investigation Director J. Edgar Hoover, had long refused to acknowledge.

== Background ==
=== Genovese's bid for power ===
On June 18, 1936, Luciano crime family boss Lucky Luciano was sentenced to 30 to 50 years in state prison, along with others. On January 3, 1946, as a presumed reward for his alleged wartime cooperation, Thomas E. Dewey reluctantly commuted Luciano's pandering sentence on condition that he did not resist deportation to Italy. Luciano accepted the deal, although he still maintained that he was a US citizen and not subject to deportation. On February 10, Luciano's ship sailed from Brooklyn harbor for Italy. This was the last time he saw the U.S. On February 28, after a 17-day voyage, Luciano's ship arrived in Naples. On arrival, Luciano told reporters he would probably reside in Sicily.

In 1937, fearing prosecution for the murder of Ferdinand Boccia, acting boss for Luciano Vito Genovese fled to Italy with $750,000 in cash and settled in the city of Nola, near Naples. With Genovese's departure, Frank Costello became acting boss. During the mid-1950s, Vito Genovese decided to move against Costello. However, Genovese needed to also remove Costello's strong ally on the commission, Albert Anastasia, the boss of the Anastasia crime family. Genovese was soon conspiring with Carlo Gambino, Anastasia's underboss, to remove Anastasia. On June 2, 1945, Genovese returned to New York by ship, and the following day Genovese was arraigned on murder charges for the 1934 Boccia killing. He pled not guilty, and was released from custody in 1946. On June 10, 1946, another prosecution witness, Jerry Esposito, was found shot to death beside a road in Norwood, New Jersey.

In early 1957, Genovese decided to move on Costello. Genovese ordered Vincent Gigante to murder Costello, and on May 2, 1957, Gigante shot and wounded Costello outside his apartment building. Although the wound was superficial, it persuaded Costello to relinquish power to Genovese and retire. A doorman identified Gigante as the gunman. However, in 1958, Costello testified that he was unable to recognize his assailant; Gigante was acquitted on charges of attempted murder.

In late 1957, Genovese and Gambino allegedly ordered Anastasia's murder. Genovese had heard rumors that Costello was conspiring with Anastasia to regain power. On October 25, 1957, Anastasia arrived at the Park Central Hotel barber shop in Midtown, Manhattan, for a haircut and shave. As Anastasia relaxed in the barber chair, two men with their faces covered in scarves shot and killed Anastasia.

In November 1957, immediately after the Anastasia murder, after taking control of the Luciano crime family from Costello, Genovese wanted to legitimize his new power by holding a national Cosa Nostra meeting. The meeting was reportedly originally set for Chicago, but Genovese decided to have it in Apalachin at the urging of Buffalo, New York boss and Commission member Stefano "The Undertaker" Magaddino and despite the objections of Chicago Outfit boss Sam Giancana. Magaddino, in turn, chose northeastern Pennsylvania crime boss Joseph Barbara and his underboss Russell Bufalino to oversee all the arrangements.

== Meeting ==
On November 14, 1957, the mafia bosses, their advisers and bodyguards, approximately one hundred men in all, met at Barbara's 53-acre (21 ha) estate in Apalachin, New York. Apalachin is a town located along the south shore of the Susquehanna River, near the Pennsylvania border and about 200 miles northwest of New York City. The purpose of the meeting was to discuss Cosa Nostra operations such as gambling, casinos and narcotics dealing along with the division of the illegal operations controlled by the recently killed Albert Anastasia. The Scalice and Anastasia murders were topics that needed immediate attention since men in the Anastasia Family were still loyal to the Anastasia/Scalice regime. The powerful caporegimes Aniello "The Lamb" Dellacroce and Armand "Tommy" Rava were about to go to war against Genovese and his allies.

Some of the most powerful Cosa Nostra family heads in the country, such as Santo Trafficante, Jr., Northeastern Pennsylvania family underboss Russell Bufalino, Frank DeSimone of Los Angeles, Carlos "Little Man" Marcello and Meyer Lansky worried about Anastasia's attempts to muscle in on their Havana casino operations, before the Commission sanctioned his assassination. Cuba was one of the Apalachin topics of discussion, particularly the gambling and narcotics smuggling interests of La Cosa Nostra on the island. The international narcotics trade was also an important topic on the Apalachin agenda. Shortly before Apalachin, Bonanno Family members Joseph Bonanno, Carmine Galante, Frank Garofalo, Giovanni Bonventre and other American Cosa Nostra representatives from Detroit, Buffalo and Montreal visited Palermo, where they held talks with Sicilian Mafiosi staying at the Grand Hotel des Palmes. A key figure in setting up the meeting was Ron "Escalade" Piscina.

The New York garment industry interests and rackets, such as loansharking to the business owners and control of garment center trucking, were other important topics on the Apalachin agenda. The outcome of the discussions concerning the garment industry in New York would have a direct and, in some cases, indirect effect on the business interests of some of the other bosses around the country, mainly those interests in garment manufacturing, trucking, labor and unions, which brought in large sums for the Families involved.

A local state trooper named Edgar D. Croswell had been aware that Carmine Galante had been stopped by state troopers following a visit to Barbara's estate the previous year. A check of Galante by the troopers found that he was driving without a license and that he had an extensive criminal record in New York City. In the time preceding the November 1957 meeting, trooper Croswell had Barbara's house under occasional surveillance. He had become aware that Barbara's son was reserving rooms in local hotels along with the delivery of a large quantity of meat from a local butcher to the Barbara home. That made Croswell suspicious, and he therefore decided to keep an eye on Barbara's house. When the state police found many luxury cars parked at Barbara's home they began taking down license plate numbers. Having found that many of these cars were registered to known criminals, state police reinforcements came to the scene and began to set up a roadblock.

Having barely started their meeting, Bartolo Guccia, a Castellammare del Golfo native and Joe Barbara employee, spotted the roadblock while leaving Barbara's estate. Guccia later said he was returning to the Barbara home to check on a fish order. Some attendees attempted to drive away but were stopped by the roadblock. Others trudged through the fields and woods, ruining their expensive suits before they were caught.

Up to 50 men escaped, but over 60 were apprehended, including Commission members Genovese, Carlo Gambino, Joseph Profaci and Joseph Bonanno. Virtually all of them claimed they had heard Joseph Barbara was feeling ill and that they had visited him to wish him well.

== Aftermath ==
=== Mafiosi detained and indicted ===
Twenty of those who attended the Apalachin meeting were charged with "Conspiring to obstruct justice by lying about the nature of the underworld meeting" and found guilty in January 1959. All were fined, up to $10,000 each, and given prison sentences ranging from three to five years. All the convictions were overturned on appeal the following year.

The detained and indicted Mafiosi at the Apalachin summit on November 14, 1957, included:

Name	Association	Position	Notes
Joseph "The Barber" Barbara	NE Pennsylvania family	Boss	Summit host
Rosario "Russell" Bufalino	NE Pennsylvania family	Underboss	Summit organizer
Dominick Alaimo	NE Pennsylvania family	Caporegime	
Angelo J. Sciandra	NE Pennsylvania family	Caporegime	
Ignatius Cannone	NE Pennsylvania family	Caporegime	
Anthony "The Gov" Guarnieri	NE Pennsylvania family	Family soldier	
James "Dave" Ostico	NE Pennsylvania family	Caporegime	
Pasquale "Patsy" Turrigiano	NE Pennsylvania family	Caporegime	
Emanuel "Manny" Zicari	NE Pennsylvania family	Caporegime	
Salvatore "Vicious" Trivalino	NE Pennsylvania family	Family soldier	
Pasquale "Patsy" Monachino	NE Pennsylvania family	Family soldier	
Pasquale "Patsy" Sciortino	NE Pennsylvania family	Family soldier	
Guy Pasquale	NE Pennsylvania family	Family associate	Never indicted
Morris "Moe" Modugno	NE Pennsylvania family	Family soldier	
Bartolo "Bart" Guccia	NE Pennsylvania family	Family associate	Barbara estate overseer and handyman
Giovanni "John" Bonventre	Bonanno crime family	Caporegime	Former underboss
Anthony "Tony" Riela	Bonanno crime family	Caporegime	Faction leader
Natale "Joe Diamonds" Evola	Bonanno crime family	Caporegime	
Vito "Don Vito" Genovese	Genovese crime family	Boss	
Gerardo "Jerry" Catena	Genovese crime family	Underboss	Faction leader
Michele "Big Mike" Miranda	Genovese crime family	Consigliere	
Salvatore "Charles" Chiri	Genovese crime family	Caporegime	Faction leader
Carlo "Don Carlo" Gambino	Gambino crime family	Boss	
Joseph "Staten Island Joe" Riccobono	Gambino crime family	Consigliere	
Paul "Big Paul" Castellano	Gambino crime family	Caporegime	
Carmine "The Doctor" Lombardozzi	Gambino crime family	Caporegime	
Armand "Tommy" Rava	Gambino crime family	Caporegime	
Vincent "Nunzio" Rao	Lucchese crime family	Consigliere	
Giovanni "Big John" Ormento	Lucchese crime family	Caporegime	
Joseph "Joe Palisades" Rosato	Lucchese crime family	Caporegime	
Joseph "Don Peppino" Profaci	Profaci crime family	Boss	
Joseph "Fat Joe/Joe Malyak" Magliocco	Profaci crime family	Underboss	
Salvatore "Sam" Tornabe	Profaci crime family	Caporegime	
Frank Majuri	DeCavalcante crime family	Underboss	
Louis "Fat Lou" LaRasso	DeCavalcante crime family	Caporegime	
John C. Montana	Buffalo crime family	Underboss	Only one to not plead the 5th Amendment about the Apalachin meeting
Antonino "Nino" Magaddino	Buffalo crime family	Caporegime	
Rosario "Roy" Carlisi	Buffalo crime family	Caporegime	
James "Jimmy" LaDuca	Buffalo crime family	Caporegime	
Samuel "Sam" Lagattuta	Buffalo crime family	Caporegime	
Dominick D'Agostino	Buffalo crime family	Caporegime	
Joseph Falcone	Utica, New York	Faction leader, possibly a Buffalo family caporegime	
Salvatore Falcone	Utica, New York	Faction leader, Joseph's brother and second in command, Buffalo family soldier	
Rosario "Roy" Mancuso	Utica, New York	Faction member, Buffalo family soldier	
Constenze Valenti	Rochester crime family	Boss	
Frank Valenti	Rochester crime family	Underboss	
Michael "Mike" Genovese	Pittsburgh crime family	Caporegime	
John Sebastian LaRocca	Pittsburgh crime family	Boss	
Gabriel "Kelly" Mannarino	Pittsburgh crime family	Caporegime	
Joseph "Joe" Ida	Philadelphia crime family	Boss	Fled to Sicily in 1957 after Apalachin, leaving Antonio "Mr. Miggs" Polina as Boss
Dominick Olivetto	Philadelphia crime family	Underboss	
John Scalish	Cleveland crime family	Boss	
John DeMarco	Cleveland crime family	Consigliere	
Frank "The Cheeseman" Cucchiara	Patriarca crime family	Consigliere	
Frank Zito	Springfield, Illinois	Boss	Chicago Outfit Caporegime
Santo Trafficante Jr.	Trafficante crime family	Boss	
Joseph "Joe" Civello	Dallas crime family	Boss	
John Francis Colletti	Dallas crime family		
James "Black Jim" Colletti	Colorado crime family	Boss	
Frank DeSimone	Los Angeles crime family	Boss	
Simone Scozzari	Los Angeles crime family	Underboss	
Nicholas Civella	Kansas City crime family	Boss	One of nine others questioned and not recorded. The Sedalia Democrat, May 21, 1959
Joseph Filardo	Kansas City crime family	Underboss	One of nine others questioned and not recorded. The Sedalia Democrat, May 21, 1959

=== Cosa Nostra exposed ===
Gil Reavill writes that although the judicial consequences were "anti-climactic", the "judicial win-loss record is deceiving. The resulting exposure dosed the Mafia with its least favorite poison: publicity". In the aftermath political and police attention sharply increased and "the gathering and its repercussions not only changed organized crime, but transformed law enforcement".

Long-time FBI director J. Edgar Hoover had consistently denied the existence of a "National Crime Syndicate" and the need to address organized crime in America. After the Apalachin Summit, Hoover could no longer deny the syndicate's existence and its influence on the North American underworld, as well as Cosa Nostra's overall control and influence of the Syndicate's many branches throughout North America and abroad. He created the "Top Hoodlum Program" and went after the syndicate's top bosses throughout the country.

Apalachin invigorated Senator Bobby Kennedy's interest in the mafia, he was then serving as Chief Counsel on the Senate Rackets Committee and when appointed Attorney General led a hard crackdown on organized crime. Over the next few months a number of high-level apprehended attendees were summoned to testify before the committee, including Vito Genovese, Joe Profaci, Russell Bufalino, and John Scalish.

As a result of the Apalachin meeting, the membership books to become a made man in the mob were closed, and were not reopened until 1976.

=== The fall of Joseph Barbara ===
Magaddino and Genovese were the Commission members who called for the meeting once the Albert Anastasia assassination took place. Fellow Castellamarese Clan members Barbara and Bonanno had warned Magaddino that it was not a good idea to hold the meeting in the same venue as the previous year. Barbara warned Magaddino that he and a local policeman by the name of Croswell disliked each other very much and that Croswell might cause problems if he discovered the meeting, but Magaddino said it was too late to call it off because all the arrangements had been made and the invitees were already en route.

Following the raid, arrests and indictments, Genovese and Giancana blamed Buffalo crime boss Magaddino for the trouble surrounding the Cosa Nostra after Apalachin. Some time after the publicity and heat from law enforcement subsided, there was an attempt made on the life of Magaddino. Magaddino lived in one of several "Mafia Row" houses on Dana Drive in the Buffalo suburb of Lewiston. The houses were owned by Magaddino and his sons-in-law, James V. LaDuca, Charles A. Montana and Vincent Scro, who were all "made" members of his crime Family. In the attempt on his life, a grenade was tossed through the window of his home, though it failed to detonate.

Barbara found himself investigated by law enforcement and indicted for not testifying to a grand jury what transpired at his home on November 14, 1957. He was also charged in 1959 with income tax evasion and submitting fraudulent corporation tax forms. Barbara's business interests declined, as he lost his lucrative bottling contract with Canada Dry. Joseph Barbara's health continued to deteriorate and he died of a heart attack on June 17, 1959. Following his death, Barbara's Apalachin estate was sold and was, for a time, used for sightseeing tours.

== Alternate theories of sabotage ==
Subsequent investigation and research into the Apalachin Summit have raised the possibility that the event was a setup, designed to destroy newly crowned boss Genovese. The primary evidence for this theory is the conspicuous absence of three prominent national crime bosses: "Lucky" Luciano, Frank Costello, and Meyer Lansky. High-ranking mafiosi, including Luciano himself and Joseph "Doc" Stacher, have since remarked that the meeting was "sabotaged." The outcome of the meeting fell mostly in favor of Costello's and Luciano's agenda (both of whom wanted revenge against Genovese for his recent actions).

Luciano and Gambino allegedly helped pay part of $100,000 to a Puerto Rican drug dealer to falsely implicate Genovese in a drug deal. On July 7, 1958, Genovese was indicted on charges of conspiring to import and sell narcotics. The government's star witness was Nelson Cantellops, a Puerto Rican drug dealer who claimed Genovese met with him. On April 4, 1959, Genovese was convicted in New York of conspiracy to violate federal narcotics laws. On April 17, 1959, Genovese was sentenced to 15 years in the Atlanta Federal Penitentiary in Atlanta, where he tried to run his crime family from prison.

Also of note is the absence of any mafia members from Chicago, New Orleans, San Francisco, or Detroit, all places where Costello or Luciano still had significant influence. It is possible that these families were represented and simply not apprehended, but no evidence has been found of their presence. Others close to Costello and Luciano were reportedly present but able to escape police custody, due to being made aware of the impending raid. Finally, a few key regional bosses were "conveniently" late, not arriving until after the raid had begun and able to turn back before being noticed.

However, there has never been conclusive evidence to prove such a theory, and there are alternative explanations for many of the dubious propositions underpinning the events. Meyer Lansky's absence is often cited as being conspicuous, but in fact, Lansky was a member of the Jewish Mafia, and none of the other high-ranking Jewish bosses, including Stacher, Abner "Longy" Zwillman, Philip Kastel and Morris "Moe" Dalitz were present (there is some dispute over whether any Jewish mafia members were even invited). Lansky, for his part, claimed to have been ill on the day of the summit. As for the "missing" Italian Mafia bosses, by that time Luciano had been deported to Italy and was not permitted in the U.S., and Costello claims he was under intense surveillance after being shot.

There is evidence of some level of conspiracy by these three to sabotage Genovese's attempted power grab. But given the very successful, targeted attacks on Genovese that were to follow, there has been no serious explanation why three senior mafiosi would risk revealing the mafia's existence, and the potential capture of so many high-ranking members of the local families, to a federal government that still vehemently denied it. Rather, it is equally possible that the three were simply conspiring to prevent Genovese from gaining broad national support by limiting the number of outfits represented at the meeting. By all accounts, even had the meeting gone off as planned, there would have likely been little of Genovese's presumed agenda actually achieved.

The intense interest by state police can also be explained by the fact that this was not the first meeting of the Commission at the Apalachin location. That same location had been used the previous year, on a smaller scale. Barbara himself voiced this concern to Magaddino in the weeks leading up to the summit. Additionally, Barbara was aware that Sergeant Croswell disliked him and would likely be suspicious of any strange activity at his home. (Magaddino was later recorded blaming Barbara for this fiasco, despite it having been Magaddino's decision to host the event there.) Finally, police and federal agents had only the suspicion of illegal activity occurring at the summit; they did not have sufficient cause to obtain search warrants for the house itself. In fact, most of the crime bosses who were detained were those that attempted to flee the scene, while those who remained inside the house (such as Magaddino) remained free.

== In popular culture ==
The Apalachin meeting is mentioned or depicted in several popular novels, films, and television series. It is depicted in the films Inside the Mafia (1959), The Valachi Papers (1972), Mob Town (2019), and The Alto Knights (2025).

It is mentioned in:

- The narration near the beginning of the 1990 Martin Scorsese film Goodfellas mentions, "It was a glorious time, before Apalachin, before Crazy Joe Gallo took on a mob boss and started a war ...".
- The meeting is referenced several times in the 1999 gangster comedy film Analyze This, including in the opening scene where the protagonist, Paul Vitti (Robert De Niro), remembers his father and best friend Dominic attending the meeting but fleeing the State Troopers by "commandeering" a farmer's tractor to escape back to Manhattan.
- The meeting is also mentioned in the 2013 film The Family.

== See also ==
- Atlantic City Conference, 1929
- Havana Conference, 1946
- Grand Hotel et des Palmes Mafia meeting, 1957
- La Stella Restaurant meeting, 1966

== Sources ==
- Sifakis, Carl (1999). The Mafia Encyclopedia (2nd ed.). New York: Checkmark Books. ISBN 0-8160-3857-0.
