= Vincent Meli =

American mobster

- Born: Vincenzo Angelo Meli; January 2, 1921; San Cataldo, Sicily, Kingdom of Italy
- Died: January 7, 2008 (aged 87); Warren, Michigan, U.S.
- Resting place: Resurrection Cemetery, Clinton Township, Macomb County, Michigan, U.S.
- Other name: Little Vince Meli
- Citizenship: United States
- Education: University of Notre Dame (1944)
- Occupation: Mobster
- Children: 6
- Relatives: Bill Bufalino (brother-in-law); Angelo Meli (uncle); Jack Tocco (cousin-in-law)
- Allegiance: Detroit Partnership
- Conviction: Extortion (1979)
- Penalty: Three years' imprisonment

Vincent "Vincenzo" Angelo Meli (/ˈmɛlɪ/; Italian: [ˈmɛːli]; January 2, 1921 – January 7, 2008) was an Italian born-American mobster who was a soldier of the Detroit crime family.

== Early years ==
Meli was born on January 2, 1921, in San Cataldo, Sicily, to Frank Meli and Grazia Panzica; and he immigrated to the United States at the age of 10. His father was a member of the Detroit Partnership along with his uncle Angelo Meli. His sister, Marie Antoinette, married attorney Bill Bufalino. His cousin, Maria, married Jack Tocco, future crime boss of the family.

In 1944, he graduated from the University of Notre Dame in South Bend, Indiana. Enlisting in the United States Army soon after graduation, Meli saw a lot of action and was discharged three years later. During his service, Vincent was a member of Operation Overlord. This was the code name for the Battle of Normandy where Allied operations launched the successful invasion of German-occupied western Europe during World War II. His division was a primary force in helping to secure Nuremberg concentration camps and free the prisoners.

Meli married Grace Mercurio, and had two daughters, Carmen and Phyllis, and four sons, Frank, Carl, Vincent, and Paul.

== Music business and labor racketeering ==
Shortly after his return to Detroit, Meli became involved in organized crime. He was a major crime figure who attempted to gain control of Detroit's coin machine industry. At age 24, with the financial backing of his uncle Angelo, successfully bought the Meltone Music and Jay-Cee Music Co with Peter Tocco, Michael Polizzi, and Raffaele Quasarano.

A capo by the 1960s, Meli was a major labor racketeer and, through Anthony "Tony Jack" Giacalone, was an associate of Teamsters Union President Jimmy Hoffa. During the 1990s, Meli was tied to labor racketeering. He was named by former Detroit mobster Nove Tocco and retired federal agents as an associate of Michael Bane, president of Pontiac, Michigan's Teamster Local 614, during federal investigations into labor union corruption.

In 1979, Meli was convicted of extortion, and began serving a three-year sentence on January 3, 1984.

== Death ==
Meli died on January 7, 2008, of bone cancer at St. John Macomb-Oakland Hospital Warren in Warren, Michigan, at the age of 87. He is buried in Resurrection Cemetery, Clinton Township, Macomb County, Michigan.
