= Riverside Cemetery (Apalachin, New York) =

Historic cemetery in New York, United States

- U.S. National Register of Historic Places
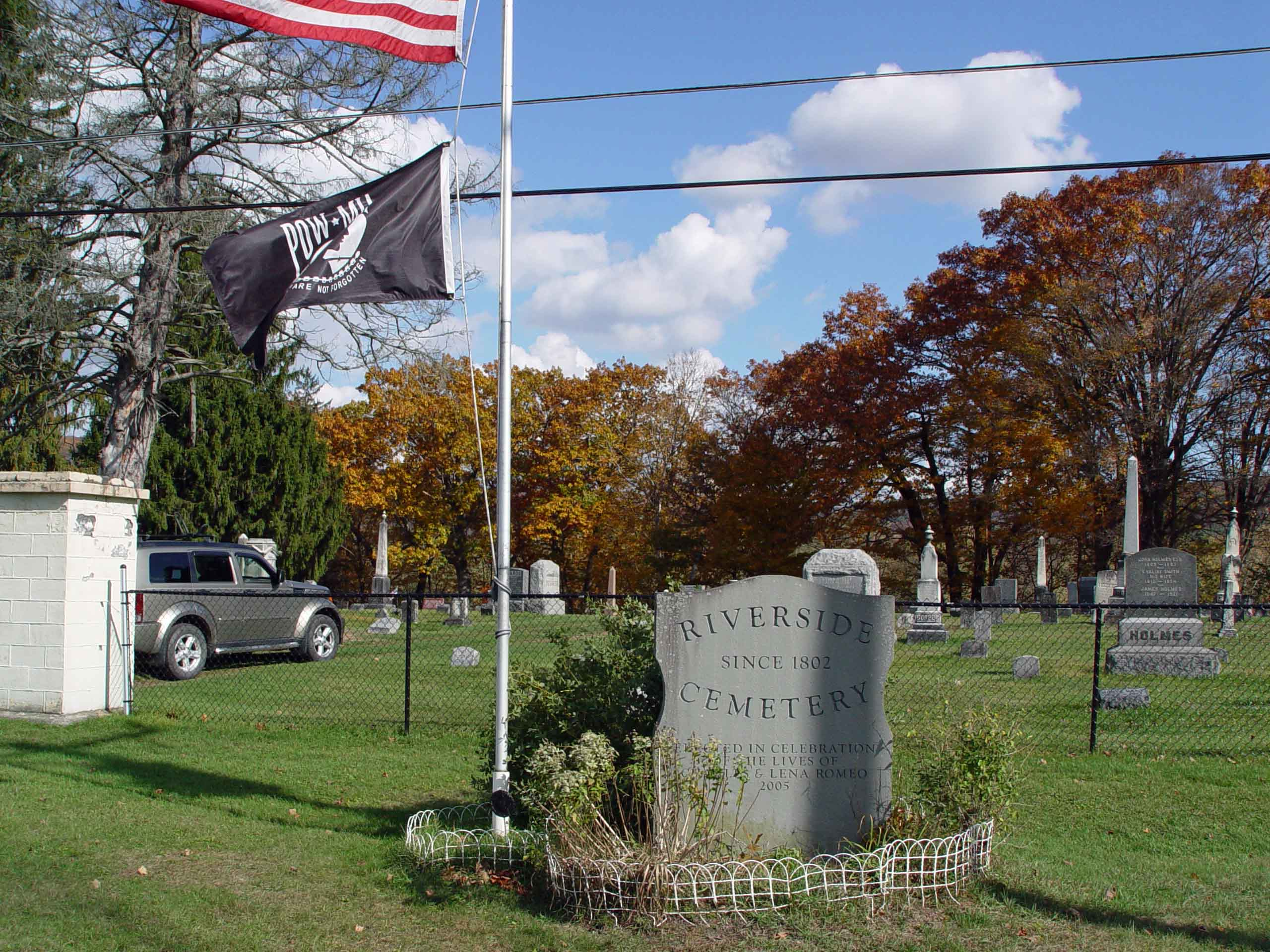

- Location within New York Location within the United States
- Location: Marshland Rd., Apalachin, New York
- Coordinates: 42°05′08″N 76°09′34″W
- Area: 6.09 acres (2.46 ha)
- Built: 1802
- Built by: Brewster, John
- NRHP reference No.: 13001093
- Added to NRHP: January 15, 2014

Riverside Cemetery is a historic cemetery located near Apalachin in Tioga County, New York. It was established in 1802, with late-19th century additions and an addition in 1939. It remains an active burial ground containing approximately 3,600 burials. It is the final resting place of many early settlers of the region. A set of stone entrance gates were installed in 1939. Notable burials include May Louise Davison Purple (1871-1957), wife of author Eugene Manlove Rhodes.

It was listed on the National Register of Historic Places in 2014.
