= William D'Elia =

American mobster (born 1946)

- Born: June 24, 1946 (age 80); Pittston, Pennsylvania, U.S.
- Other name: Big Billy
- Spouse: Ellen D'Elia
- Children: 3

William "Big Billy" D'Elia (born June 24, 1946) is an American former mobster who was the head of the Bufalino crime family and protégé of family namesake Russell Bufalino. Because of his close relationship with Bufalino and his hitman Frank Sheeran, law enforcement had long believed that D'Elia knew many details of Bufalino's long history within organized crime, including his alleged role in the 1975 disappearance of former Teamsters leader Jimmy Hoffa.

== Background ==
D'Elia grew up in Pittston, Pennsylvania and began working with the Bufalino family in the mid-1960s as Bufalino's driver and gofer. Rising through the ranks, D'Elia avoided scrutiny from law enforcement for many years. D'Elia was said to be a mediator among mob families, meeting frequently with gangsters from across the country including the Philadelphia crime family, Los Angeles and New York City. But his skill at avoiding the press and law enforcement left many unanswered questions regarding his life with the Bufalino family.

Following Bufalino's death in 1994, D'Elia assumed control of the family and expanded the organization into legitimate operations such as waste management and controlling shares of Spanel Transportation and the Newcastle Group, the latter of which is a suspected money laundering operation.

In 1990, D'Elia was implicated in a money laundering operation involving The Metro, a newspaper in Exeter, Pennsylvania. The Internal Revenue Service (IRS) charged that over $3.0 million in drug and prostitution money was hidden as revenue from fictional Metro newspaper ads and subscriptions. The Metro closed in 1998.

== Prosecution and prison ==
On May 31, 2001, IRS agents, US Postal Service Inspectors, and Pennsylvania State Police obtained search warrants for the homes of several Bufalino crime family members, including D'Elia and his mistress. The agents seized records relevant to a tax evasion investigation from which D'Elia claimed a loss of $6 million while reporting $8,000 in gambling operations in Atlantic City, New Jersey. On February 26, 2003, the New Jersey Casino Control Commission banned D'Elia from entering any Atlantic City, New Jersey casinos and he remains on the Exclusion List of the New Jersey Division of Gaming Enforcement.

On May 31, 2006, D'Elia was indicted on federal charges of laundering $600,000 in illegal drugs proceeds. When D'Elia learned that a co-conspirator might testify against him, D'Elia allegedly plotted to kill him. In August 2006, D'Elia unwittingly told an informant that he would give him photographs of a prosecution witness and later signal him to kill the man. In November 2006, D'Elia was charged with trying to kill a witness and with new charges of money laundering.

On March 12, 2008, D'Elia pleaded guilty to reduced charges of money laundering, conspiracy, and witness tampering as part of a plea agreement. Prosecutors dropped the solicitation to kill a witness charge after D'Elia testified before a Dauphin County grand jury that indicted Mount Airy Casino Resort owner Louis DeNaples for perjury for lying to the Pennsylvania Gaming Control Board about his long relationship with D'Elia and Bufalino. He was sentenced to nine years in prison and prosecutors touted his sentencing in October 2008 as the end of the Bufalino family.

D'Elia was released from prison in February 2013.

== Personal life ==
As of 2008, D'Elia lived in Hughestown, Pennsylvania with his wife Ellen Ward D'Elia. They have three children: a son, Russell (named after Bufalino), and two daughters, Carolyn (named after Bufalino's wife), and Miriam, an attorney in Philadelphia. Ellen Ward D’Elia died on February 26, 2026.

== The Life We Chose ==
After years of remaining silent, D'Elia agreed in 2020 to be interviewed by investigative journalist and author Matt Birkbeck. They spoke for two years, which resulted in the bestselling book The Life We Chose. Published on July 11, 2023 by William Morrow, D'Elia told the story of his life with Russell Bufalino and the book produced numerous media headlines, including details on the murder of Jimmy Hoffa, the making of The Godfather movie and D'Elia's dealings with President Donald Trump.

== See also ==
- List of Italian-American mobsters
- List of crime bosses convicted in the 21st century
