= Edward Sciandra =

Italian American mobster (1912–2003)

Edward "Eddie The Conductor" Sciandra (November 13, 1912 – July 13, 2003), was an Italian born member of the Mafia from Montedoro, Sicily. Sciandra was the former boss of the Bufalino crime family, and expanded their operations into Florida.

== Criminal career ==
Sciandra was known to be an old-school man, especially with his work. He moved to Jamaica, Queens in the 1950s or 1960s. From there he moved to Pennsylvania and reunited with his cousin Russell Bufalino. Sciandra then began working with the Bufalino crime family sometime in the late 1960s and became a made man. Later, in 1980, he became the acting boss for Bufalino while he was imprisoned. After Sciandra, the current boss William D'Elia took over.

On November 9, 1981, Sciandra was indicted by the federal grand jury in the Southern District of New York, charged with violating the Internal Revenue Code along with Bufalino family associate Vincent Foti, Sr., New York City businessman Yale Kroloff and Peter Cardaisis. On January 15, 1982, Sciandra, Foti and Cardaisis pleaded guilty.

Sciandra died on Long Island, New York on July 13, 2003.
