= Mount Airy Lodge =

Hotel in Paradise Township, Pennsylvania, US

Coordinates: 41.113°N 75.321°W

The Mount Airy Lodge, built in the 1890s, was a five-star hotel and resort located in Paradise Township near Mount Pocono, Pennsylvania. It was closed on October 29, 2001, and demolished in subsequent years. The site now houses Mount Airy Casino Resort.

== History ==
Constructed in 1898 as an eight-room inn, Mount Airy Lodge was rebuilt in the 1950s as the Pocono's largest resort. In its heyday in the 1960s and '70s, Mount Airy had more than 890 rooms, indoor and outdoor pools, skiing, snowmobiling, ice skating, hiking, biking, horseback riding, archery, an 18-hole golf course, and paddleball courts on over 1,000 acres (400 ha) of property.

== Fame ==
For more than half a century Mount Airy Lodge was known as America's premier "honeymoon hideaway," with floor-to-ceiling mirrors, velvet-swagged canopy beds, and heart-shaped bathtubs. It was also known for its top entertainment. The Crystal Room, Mount Airy's 2,000-seat show palace, hosted headliners like Bob Hope, Milton Berle, Connie Francis, Red Buttons, Tony Bennett, Paul Anka, and Nipsey Russell.

In 1961, pop artist Roy Lichtenstein used an advertisement for Mount Airy to create his artwork Girl with Ball, which is currently housed in the Museum of Modern Art in New York City.

== Legacy ==
The resort closed on October 29, 2001, and was demolished in subsequent years. The site now houses Mount Airy Casino Resort.

In January 2023, Canadian singer-songwriter Nicole Dollanganger released her seventh album Married in Mount Airy with its title track inspired from the lodge, describing the décor and sampling the past jingle of the resort: "All you have to bring is your love of everything."

Dollanganger dedicated the album to Emil Wagner, a previous owner of the lodge, in the credits of the physical booklet.
