= Louis DeNaples =

American businessman, banker and casino owner

Louis DeNaples is an American businessman, banker, and casino owner from Dunmore, Pennsylvania. He was the owner of Keystone Landfill Inc., DeNaples Auto Parts Inc. and chairman of the board of the First National Community Bancorp. In January 2008, DeNaples was charged with four counts of perjury related to his ties with the Bufalino crime family in his application for a Pennsylvania state gambling license. The charges were dropped in April 2009 after DeNaples agreed to turn over legal control of Mount Airy Casino resort to his family.

== Biography ==
In 1978, DeNaples pleaded no contest to a conspiracy charge of defrauding the U.S. government of $525,000 in contracts related to the cleanup and recovery of the City of Scranton in the aftermath of Hurricane Agnes. Prosecutors claimed DeNaples plotted with three county employees to falsify records to obtain $525,000 in federal reimbursements. His trial ended in a hung jury with one holdout forcing an acquittal. He was fined $10,000 and was placed on probation for three years. In 1983, four people, including James Osticco, a Bufalino crime family underboss, were convicted in 1982 of jury tampering for bribing the holdout juror and her husband in DeNaples's trial.

In 2001, as part of a federal gambling investigation, four informants made mention of a relationship between DeNaples and current leader of the Bufalino crime family William D'Elia. The informants alleged DeNaples made payments to D'Elia for undisclosed work and paid the crime boss protection money.

In April 2012, the Board of Governors of the Federal Reserve System ordered DeNaples to resign as chairman of First National Community Bancorp and begin divesting himself of his controlling interest in the bank owing to his 2009 perjury charges, which were later dropped. On May 10, 2012, a three-judge panel denied his appeal and ordered his immediate resignation.

In 2013, a federal appeals court unanimously reversed the ban, allowing DeNaples back on the board of First National Community Bank, and blasted regulators for abusing the law. From the Allentown Morning Call: "The 22-page decision by a three-judge panel of the U.S. Court of Appeals for the District of Columbia lambasted the federal regulators for 'bizarre,' 'untenable' and 'scatter-shot' enforcement of the law and faulted regulators for inconsistently applying the unclear and not properly framed or communicated rules."

In 2015, DeNaples petitioned the Pennsylvania Gaming Board to allow his business to conduct business such as garbage collection and snow removal at the Mount Airy Casino, however the board voted against the proposal.
