= Girl with Ball =

Painting by Roy Lichtenstein

- Artist: Roy Lichtenstein
- Year: 1961
- Movement: Pop art
- Dimensions: 153 cm × 91.9 cm (60 in × 36.2 in)
- Location: Museum of Modern Art, New York City

Girl with Ball is a 1961 painting by Roy Lichtenstein. It is an oil on canvas Pop art work that is now in the collection of the Museum of Modern Art, after being owned for several decades by Philip Johnson. It is one of Lichtenstein's earliest Pop art works and is known for its source, which is a newspaper ad that ran for several decades and which was among Lichtenstein's earliest works sourced from pop culture.

Girl with Ball was exhibited at Lichtenstein's first solo exhibition and was displayed in Newsweek's review of the show. This work significantly alters the original source and is considered exemplary of Lichtenstein's works that exaggerate the mechanically produced appearance although the result of his painterly work. It is an enduring depiction of the contemporary beauty figure.

== Background ==
The source of Girl with Ball was a common advertisement image.

Girl with Ball was inspired by a 1961 advertisement for the Mount Airy Lodge in the Pocono Mountains. The ad, which started running in 1955, was widely published in the New York metropolitan area and elsewhere, including several prominent newspapers such as The New York Times and the Daily News. The advertisement was still running in newspapers more than twenty years after Lichtenstein produced the work.

According to the Lichtenstein Foundation website, in autumn 1961, a fellow teacher at Rutgers University named Allan Kaprow made introductions between Lichtenstein and Leo Castelli Gallery director Ivan Karp. Lichtenstein showed Karp several paintings including Girl with Ball, which was the one that intrigued Karp. Karp agreed to represent Lichtenstein weeks later. After showing the painting to Andy Warhol, he sold it to architect Philip Johnson that November. The painting appeared in Newsweek's 1962 review of Lichtenstein's Castelli Gallery show. The work appeared in the April 3, 1963 "Pop! Goes the Easel" show at the Contemporary Arts Museum Houston along with his Brattata (1962) and Head-Red and Yellow (1962).

== Description ==
Girl with Ball depicts a woman wearing a bathing suit holding a beach ball with red stripes in the same color as her lips and tongue. Lichtenstein used a painter's version of comic strip artist techniques to create his own rendition of the subject of a nostalgic photograph, resulting in a simplified work of art with its own appeal. He produced the work using Ben-Day dots of primary colors. The process is described as exaggerating the "limitations of mechanical reproduction" to strip the photograph of its polish in a startling and intense form. In 1961, this painting was groundbreaking. Facial features such as nose and mouth are depicted using "commercial shorthand".

His process of reworking original artwork is described as "abstraction by subtraction", in which all features of the original are reduced to simple graphic elements. Lichtenstein alters the planar position of the subject of the picture to position her "nearer to the picture plane". He drew the picture more distorted than might be expected of a cartoonist by augmenting and focusing on her two-dimensionality.

== Reception ==
The image and technique were regarded as unartistic. However, the painting presented an allusion to printing technology, with its Ben-Day dots, and to art history, with its "Art Nouveau forms". Though "crude and simplistic" the work demonstrates artistic intellect.

Girl with Ball is described by Diane Waldman as "striking" in the simple and bold way it presents a vacation atmosphere. She notes it is "reminiscent of Picasso's frolicking bather in one of his paintings on the subject, Bather with Beach Ball (fig. 48), 1932," especially in the way Lichtenstein has scaled down the representation and the way he depicts movement.

The newspaper ad source provided Lichtenstein with "one of the most common tropes of the day for the image of a woman." The updated Betty Grable-type subject, was a fashionable glamour figure that Lichtenstein used for a symbolic value that ranks her with "iconoclastic female figures, including Manet's Olympia, 1863, Picasso's Les Demoiselles d'Avignon, 1907 and de Kooning's three series of Women".

== See also ==
- 1961 in art
