= Russell Bufalino =

Italian-American mobster (1903–1994)

- Bufalino in the 1950s
- Born: Rosario Alfredo Bufalino; October 29, 1903; Montedoro, Sicily, Kingdom of Italy
- Died: February 25, 1994 (aged 90); Kingston, Pennsylvania, U.S.
- Resting place: Denison Cemetery, Swoyersville, Pennsylvania, U.S.
- Other names: McGee; The Old Man
- Occupation: Crime boss
- Spouse: Carolyn Sciandra (m. 1928)
- Relatives: Bill Bufalino (cousin); Edward Sciandra (cousin-in-law); John Sciandra (cousin-in-law)
- Allegiance: Bufalino crime family
- Convictions: Extortion (1977); Conspiracy (1981)
- Penalty: Four years' imprisonment 10 years' imprisonment

Russell Alfred Bufalino (/ˌbʌfəˈliːnoʊ/; born Rosario Alfredo Bufalino, Italian: [roˈzaːrjo alˈfreːdo bufaˈliːno]; October 29, 1903 – February 25, 1994) was an Italian-American mobster who became the crime boss of the Northeastern Pennsylvania Italian-American Mafia crime family known as the Bufalino crime family, which he ruled from 1959 to 1994. He was a cousin of attorney Bill Bufalino, the longtime counsel for Jimmy Hoffa.

== Early years ==
Bufalino was born on October 29, 1903, in Montedoro, Sicily, to Angelo Bufalino and Cristina Buccoleri. On July 9, 1903, his father immigrated to the United States, settling in Pittston, Pennsylvania, working as a coal miner. With his mother and siblings, Bufalino entered the United States through the Port of New York in December 1903. A few months later, Bufalino's father died in a mine accident, and his family returned to Sicily. Bufalino emigrated to the United States again in January 1906. After his mother died in 1910, he returned to Sicily again. He returned to the United States in February 1914, settling in Pittston. At the age of 14, Bufalino moved to Buffalo, New York, where he became a criminal during his teenage years. On August 9, 1928, he married Carolyn "Carrie" Sciandra, who came from a Sicilian Mafia family. Bufalino worked alongside many Buffalo mobsters, some of whom became top leaders in the Buffalo crime family and other future Cosa Nostra families along the East Coast of the United States. These relationships proved very helpful to Bufalino in his criminal career. Family and clan ties were important to Sicilian-American criminals; they created a strong, secretive support system that outsiders or law enforcement could not infiltrate. A significant friendship was with his first boss, and fellow immigrant from Montedoro, John C. Montana.

In the early 1920s, Bufalino started working with Joseph Barbara, another upstate New York bootlegger in Endicott, New York. Bufalino later moved to Kingston, Pennsylvania in 1940. The Northeastern Pennsylvania crime family controlled organized crime activities in Pittston, Scranton and Wilkes-Barre, Pennsylvania, and upstate New York areas.

In the early 1950s, the Immigration and Naturalization Service tried to have Bufalino deported several times, failed because the Italian government would not accept him back into the country.

== Apalachin meeting ==
In 1957, after taking control of the Luciano crime family from boss Frank Costello, boss Vito Genovese wanted to legitimize his new power by holding a national Cosa Nostra meeting. Genovese elected Buffalo, New York boss and Commission member, Stefano "the Undertaker" Magaddino, who in turn chose northeastern Pennsylvania crime boss Joseph Barbara and Bufalino to oversee all the arrangements.

On November 14, 1957, powerful Mafiosi from the United States and Italy convened at Barbara's estate in Apalachin, New York. Cuba was one of the Apalachin topics of discussion, particularly the gambling and narcotics smuggling interests of La Cosa Nostra on the island. The international narcotics trade was also an important topic on the agenda. The New York garment industry interests and rackets, such as loansharking to the business owners and control of garment centre trucking, were other important topics on the Apalachin agenda.

A local state trooper named Edgar D. Croswell had been aware that Carmine Galante had been stopped by state troopers following a visit to Barbara's estate the previous year. A check of Galante by the troopers found that he was driving without a license and that he had an extensive criminal record in New York City. In the time preceding the November 1957 meeting, trooper Croswell had Barbara's house under occasional surveillance. He had become aware that Barbara's son was reserving rooms in local hotels along with the delivery of a large quantity of meat from a local butcher to the Barbara home. That made Croswell suspicious, and he therefore, decided to keep an eye on Barbara's house. When the state police found many luxury cars parked at Barbara's home they took down license plate numbers. Having found that many of these cars were registered to known criminals, state police reinforcements came to the scene and set up a roadblock.

Having barely started their meeting, Bartolo Guccia, a Castellammare del Golfo native and Barbara employee, spotted a police roadblock while leaving Barbara's estate. Guccia later said he was returning to the Barbara home to check on a fish order. Some attendees attempted to drive away but were stopped by the roadblock. Others trudged through the fields and woods ruining their expensive suits, before they were caught. Many Mafiosi escaped through the woods surrounding the Barbara estate.

The police stopped a car driven by Bufalino, whose passengers included Genovese, Joseph Civello, Simone Scozzari, and Frank DeSimone, at a roadblock as they left the estate; Bufalino said that he had come to visit his sick friend Barbara. All those apprehended were fined, up to $10,000 each, and given prison sentences ranging from three to five years, however, all the convictions were overturned on appeal in 1960.

== Later years and prison ==
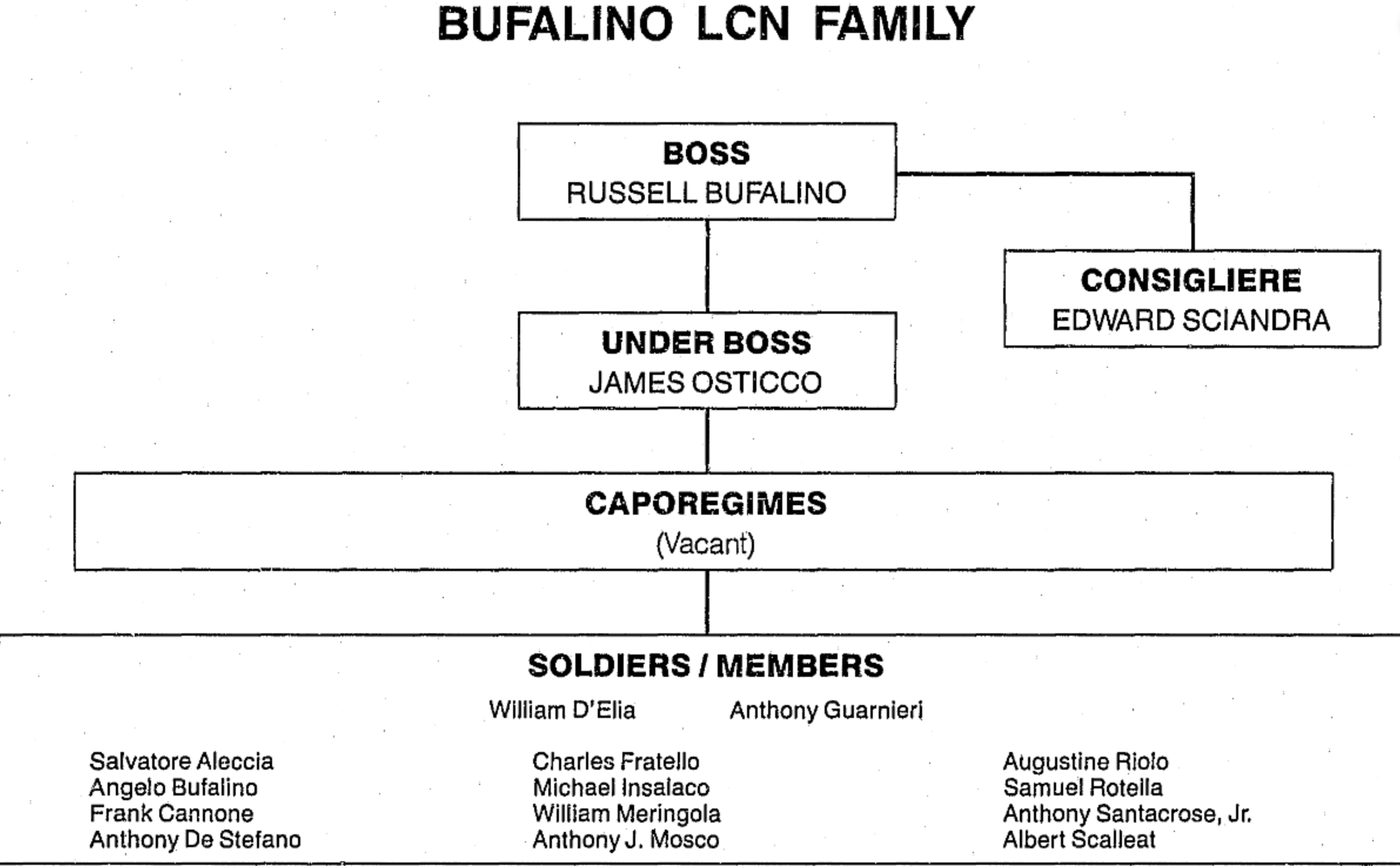
Bufalino crime family chart 1989

Following Barbara's death in June 1959, The Commission recognized Bufalino as the official family boss.

In the 1950s Bufalino was under frequent surveillance by the FBI. He and his associates were tailed when they travelled to Cuba in 1956, here they met Santo Trafficante Jr., staying there for a month. Bufalino had interests in a racetrack and in a casino near Havana, later confiscated by Fidel Castro after the Cuban Revolution. He and his associates were forced to hide away $450,000.

In 1972, after singer Al Martino had the role of Johnny Fontane in The Godfather stripped from him and given to Vic Damone, he went to Bufalino, his godfather, who then orchestrated the publication of various news articles that claimed director Francis Ford Coppola was unaware of producer Albert S. Ruddy's having given Martino the part. Damone eventually dropped the role because he did not want to provoke the mob, in addition to being paid too little. Ultimately, the part of Johnny Fontane was given to Martino.

On April 20, 1973, Bufalino was arrested in a Scranton nightclub in an FBI raid, charged with interference with interstate commerce, obstruction of justice, gambling and transporting stolen property, but later released on $50,000 bail.

In 1977, Bufalino was indicted on extortion charges after Jack Napoli, who was in the Witness Protection Program, testified that Bufalino had threatened to kill him for failing to pay a $25,000 debt to a jeweller in New York. Once Bufalino was indicted, he took steps to reduce the possibility of further criminal charges. He named caporegime Edward Sciandra as the acting boss and removed himself from the day-to-day operations of the family. On August 8, 1978, Bufalino was convicted and sentenced to four years imprisonment for his part in the extortion attempt. He served almost three years.

Bufalino was released in May 1981 but was indicted again, this time for conspiring to kill the witness, Napoli. The main prosecution witness, Jimmy Fratianno, said that he and Michael Rizzitello had been asked by Bufalino to kill Napoli in 1976. In November 1981, Bufalino was sentenced to 10 years' imprisonment, held at United States Penitentiary, Leavenworth.

== Decline and death ==
With Bufalino again in prison and the family under federal investigation, the organization's strength began to wane. In 1989, Bufalino was released from prison, and the operations of the remainder of the Northeastern family were given to Billy D'Elia.

On February 25, 1994, Bufalino died of natural causes at Nesbitt Memorial Hospital in Kingston, Pennsylvania, at the age of 90. He is buried in Denison Cemetery in Swoyersville, Pennsylvania.

== In popular culture ==
Bufalino is portrayed by Joe Pesci in Martin Scorsese's 2019 film The Irishman. Pesci was nominated for the Academy Award for Best Supporting Actor for his performance.

The Quiet Don: The True Story of Mafia Kingpin Russell Bufalino by Matt Birkbeck was published in October 2014 by Berkley Books.

American Mafia
Preceded by Joseph Barbara	Bufalino crime family Boss; 1959–1994	Succeeded by William D'Elia
