= Mount Airy Casino Resort =

Hotel and casino in Pennsylvania, United States

- Mount Airy Casino Resort in Pennsylvania Mount Airy Casino Resort (the United States)
- Interactive map of Mount Airy Casino Resort
- Location: 312 Woodland Rd, Mount Pocono, Pennsylvania 18344; 41.1133°N 75.3217°W
- Opened: October 22, 2007
- Theme: Mountain lodge
- No. of rooms: 188 (163 rooms, 25 suites)
- Gaming space: 62,000 sq ft (5,800 m^{2})
- Signature attractions: Mount Airy Golf Club; The SPA at Mount Airy
- Casino type: Land-based
- Owner: Mount Airy, No. 1, LLC.
- Previous names: Mount Airy Lodge
- Website: www.mountairycasino.com

The Mount Airy Casino Resort is a casino and hotel located in Mount Pocono, Pennsylvania, in the Pocono Mountains. The casino resort has 284 hotel rooms and a 62,000 sq ft (5,800 m^{2}) casino. Mount Airy includes more than 1,800 slot machines and more than 70 table games including poker, blackjack, craps, roulette, and baccarat. It also features several dining options ranging from a buffet to fine dining, nightlife venues, and an 18-hole golf course called Mount Airy Golf Club.

Mount Airy Casino Resort was built on the site of the former Mount Airy Lodge and first opened in October 2007. The owner, Louis DeNaples, was later charged with perjury due to suspected ties with organized crime figures. He turned ownership of the casino resort over to his daughter and avoided prosecution.

On March 29, 2019, Mount Airy Casino Resort applied for a sports betting license. The Fox Bet online sportsbook was launched on September 4, 2019. On September 9, 2019, Mount Airy Casino Resort held a soft launch for its retail sportsbook, with a two-day testing period; the full launch occurred on September 11, 2019. The 7,000-square-foot (650 m^{2}) sportsbook at the casino is located next to the poker room and has teller windows, four self-betting kiosks, and several televisions. In 2019 the Casino had a revenue of $277,194 solely from online sports betting.

In July 2020, Mount Airy Casino resort received a $50 million dollar loan from the U.S. Federal Reserve as part of the Main Street Lending Program.
