= Montedoro =

- Comune
- Comune di Montedoro
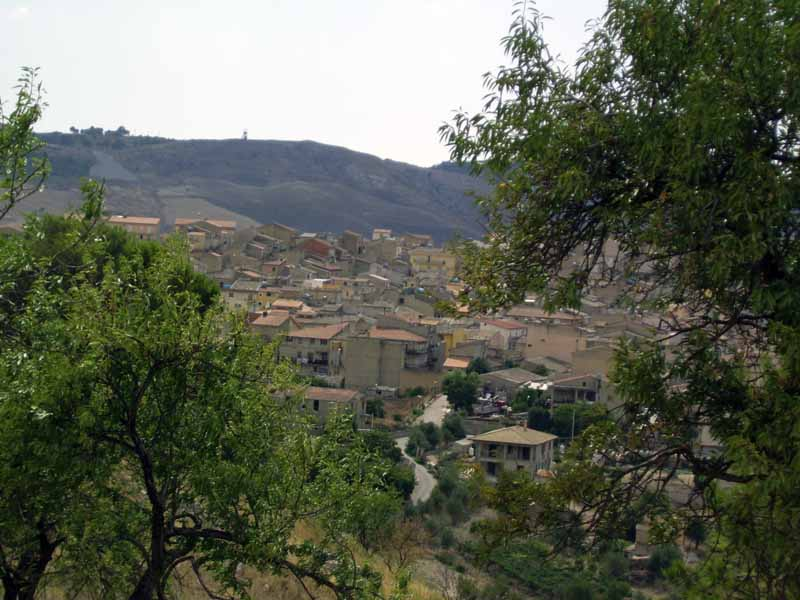

- Location within Italy Location within Sicily
- Coordinates: 37°27′N 13°49′E
- Country: Italy
- Region: Sicily
- Province: Province of Caltanissetta (CL)

Area
  - Total: 14.1 km^{2} (5.4 sq mi)
- Elevation: 450 m (1,480 ft)

Population (Dec. 2004)
  - Total: 1,751
  - Density: 124/km^{2} (322/sq mi)
- Demonym: Montedoresi
- Time zone: UTC+1 (CET)
  - Summer (DST): UTC+2 (CEST)
- Postal code: 93010
- Dialing code: 0934

Montedoro (Sicilian: Muntidoru) is a comune (municipality) in the Province of Caltanissetta in the Italian region Sicily, located about 80 kilometres (50 mi) southeast of Palermo and about 20 kilometres (12 mi) west of Caltanissetta. As of 31 December 2004, it had a population of 1,751 and an area of 14.1 square kilometres (5.4 mi^{2}).

Montedoro borders the following municipalities: Bompensiere, Canicattì, Mussomeli, Racalmuto, Serradifalco.

== History ==
The location of Montedoro has been inhabited by Sicani and then by Siculi. There are stone cave tombs ("tombe a forno") in the districts of Monte Ottavio, Mulinello, Palombaro, Fontana Grande and Fra Diego. A tomb in Tholos, called "Gruttu di li rimitu", on Mount Ottavio, testifies to the Mycenaean presence.

In the "Marcello" district have been found finds of pottery, bricks and various objects of feminine decoration, ceramic from Arezzo.

From the Berbers and the Arabs the locality was called "El Minzar" (which means panorama) and its stream "Ued dur" (river that surrounds).

In 1232 Frederick II granted the Minzarum to the bishop Ursone of Agrigento.

On March 29, 1635 Prince Don Diego Aragona Cortez Tagliavia obtained the concession to establish a village on the feudal lands ("licentia populandi") and founded Montedoro in the fiefdom Balatazza.

For about two centuries the area has based its economy on mining work. From 1815 to 1975 in the territory of Montedoro, several sulfur mines were cultivated: Nadurello, Stazzone Sociale, Grottazze, Gibellini. From 1957 to 1980 in the vicinity of Montedoro there was the cultivation of potash salts.

The rise and fall of the sulfur market in 1896 began emigration flows to the United States of America, principally to the coal mining area centered around Pittston, Pennsylvania, and from 1946 to the European countries and industrial cities of northern Italy.

Today the area has an economy mainly consisting of agriculture and the service sector. Its main crops are: almond, olive trees and vineyards. The local confectionery is also renowned.

== Demographic evolution ==
Historical population

| Year | Pop. | ±% |
|---|---|---|
| 1861 | 2,151 | — |
| 1871 | 2,372 | +10.3% |
| 1881 | 2,796 | +17.9% |
| 1901 | 3,551 | +27.0% |
| 1911 | 3,585 | +1.0% |

| Year | Pop. | ±% |
|---|---|---|
| 1921 | 2,937 | −18.1% |
| 1931 | 3,150 | +7.3% |
| 1936 | 3,434 | +9.0% |
| 1951 | 3,747 | +9.1% |
| 1961 | 3,291 | −12.2% |

| Year | Pop. | ±% |
|---|---|---|
| 1971 | 2,619 | −20.4% |
| 1981 | 2,021 | −22.8% |
| 1991 | 2,010 | −0.5% |
| 2001 | 1,780 | −11.4% |

Source: Data from ISTAT

== Culture ==
- StarGeo center, includes a Planetarium, Astronomical Observatory, Museum of Sulfur Mines, and House Museums.
- Nuova Teatro Comunale, the new community theater

== Notable people ==
- Giuseppe Bufalino, president of the province and of the CRI, preside higher institutes.
- Russell Bufalino, former boss of the Bufalino crime family.
- Louise Hamilton Caico, writer and photographer
- Giuseppe Guarino (1827-1897), archbishop of Syracuse, cardinal archbishop of Messina.
- John C. Montana, Italian-American gangster and politician
- Salvatore Paruzzo, bishop of Ourinhos.
- Angelo Petix, writer.
- Salvatore Piccillo, priest, professor of philosophy, director of the Scarabelli Library.
- Angelo Rizzo (1926-2009), bishop of Ragusa.
- Giovanni Rizzo (1890-1980), archbishop of Rossano.
- Angelo Tulumello, priest, Jesuit, publicist.
- Calogero Volpe (1910-1976), doctor, specialist in obstetrics and gynecology, radiologist, constituent, deputy and undersecretary of state, president Ente Zolfi Italiani, mayor of Montedoro.

== Sister Cities ==
- Saint-Nicolas, Liège
- Vaulx-en-Velin
- Meyzieu
