= Apalachin, New York =

- CDP
- Location within the state of New York
- Coordinates: 42°4′28″N 76°9′23″W
- Country: United States
- State: New York
- County: Tioga

Area
  - Total: 2.88 sq mi (7.45 km^{2})
  - Land: 2.88 sq mi (7.45 km^{2})
  - Water: 0 sq mi (0.00 km^{2})
- Elevation: 843 ft (257 m)

Population (2020)
  - Total: 2,632
  - Density: 915.2/sq mi (353.37/km^{2})
- Time zone: UTC-5 (Eastern (EST))
  - Summer (DST): UTC-4 (EDT)
- ZIP code: 13732
- Area code: 607
- FIPS code: 36-02308
- GNIS feature ID: 0942517

Apalachin (/ˌæpəˈleɪkɪn/ AP-ə-LAY-kin) is a census-designated place within the Town of Owego in Tioga County, New York, United States. As of the 2020 census, Apalachin had a population of 2,632. The CDP is named after Apalachin Creek.

Apalachin is in the southeastern section of the Town of Owego and is west of Binghamton. It is also part of the Binghamton Metropolitan Statistical Area.

== History ==
The first White settler arrived c. 1786, but the community was not founded until 1836.

On November 14, 1957, the Apalachin Meeting was held by the heads of the American Mafia at the home of Joseph Barbara, an Apalachin resident. This was a conference of mobsters who had gathered to iron out various issues in the underworld. The gathering was quickly broken up when a curious New York State trooper turned up and spotted expensive cars at the home. Other police officers quickly arrived to arrest those attending the conference, and sent some of the most powerful gangsters in the country fleeing through the surrounding countryside. Mafiosi and the FBI sometimes just refer to the meeting as "Apalachin". This meeting was humorously portrayed in the opening sequence of the 1999 motion picture Analyze This, which starred Robert De Niro and Billy Crystal. This meeting was also depicted in the 1972 film The Valachi Papers as well as the 2019 film Mob Town.

From 1960, until it was cancelled in 2016, the annual Apalachin Firemen's Field Days, was hosted by Apalachin, a four-day carnival, generally held in the first week of June. The event had grown from a small event in a field to one held at a permanent location with large pavilions (still called the beer and food tents by locals) and a large square of game booths that surround 15-20 carnival rides. Events included the Little Miss Apalachin contest, fireworks and a large parade.

Riverside Cemetery was listed on the National Register of Historic Places in 2014.

== Geography ==
Apalachin is located at 42°4′28″N 76°9′23″W.

According to the United States Census Bureau, the region has a total area of 1.5 square miles (3.9 km^{2}), all land.

The community is on the south side of the Susquehanna River.

Apalachin is adjacent to Interstate 86 (Pennsylvania–New York).

== Demographics ==
Historical population
Census	Pop.	Note	%±
2020	2,632		—
U.S. Decennial Census

=== 2020 census ===
As of the 2020 census, Apalachin had a population of 2,632. The median age was 42.5 years. 19.6% of residents were under the age of 18 and 16.9% of residents were 65 years of age or older. For every 100 females there were 108.2 males, and for every 100 females age 18 and over there were 111.1 males age 18 and over.

87.2% of residents lived in urban areas, while 12.8% lived in rural areas.

There were 1,070 households in Apalachin, of which 26.6% had children under the age of 18 living in them. Of all households, 56.1% were married-couple households, 14.6% were households with a male householder and no spouse or partner present, and 20.9% were households with a female householder and no spouse or partner present. About 22.5% of all households were made up of individuals and 9.2% had someone living alone who was 65 years of age or older.

There were 1,120 housing units, of which 4.5% were vacant. The homeowner vacancy rate was 1.6% and the rental vacancy rate was 4.7%.

Racial composition as of the 2020 census
Race	Number	Percent
White	2,416	91.8%
Black or African American	28	1.1%
American Indian and Alaska Native	1	0.0%
Asian	38	1.4%
Native Hawaiian and Other Pacific Islander	0	0.0%
Some other race	41	1.6%
Two or more races	108	4.1%
Hispanic or Latino (of any race)	87	3.3%

=== 2000 census ===
As of the census of 2000, there were 1,126 people, 442 households, and 307 families residing in the CDP. The population density was 763.1 inhabitants per square mile (294.6/km^{2}). There were 474 housing units at an average density of 321.2 per square mile (124.0/km^{2}). The racial makeup of the CDP was 96.54% White, 0.98% African American, 0.27% Native American, 0.62% Asian, 0.53% from other races, and 1.07% from two or more races. Hispanic or Latino people of any race were 0.53% of the population.

There were 442 households, out of which 33.9% had children under the age of 18 living with them, 51.6% were married couples living together, 13.6% had a female householder with no husband present, and 30.5% were non-families. 24.2% of all households were made up of individuals, and 7.7% had someone living alone who was 65 years of age or older. The average household size was 2.53 and the average family size was 3.03.

In the community, the population was spread out, with 26.6% under the age of 18, 9.2% from 18 to 24, 31.1% from 25 to 44, 22.1% from 45 to 64, and 11.0% who were 65 years of age or older. The median age was 37 years. For every 100 females, there were 97.2 males. For every 100 females age 18 and over, there were 96.4 males.

The median income for a household in the hamlet was $38,636, and the median income for a family was $42,647. Males had a median income of $21,902 versus $25,357 for females. The per capita income for the CDP was $14,927. About 9.5% of families and 11.2% of the population were below the poverty line, including 19.4% of those under age 18 and none of those age 65 or over.

== Education ==
Much of the CDP is in the Owego-Apalachin Central School District, while other parts of the CDP are in the Vestal Central School District.

== Notable people ==
- Joseph Barbara, mafioso
- Doug Hurley, commander of the first crewed space mission launched from American soil since 2011, as well as the first commercial flight carrying crew to the ISS
- Benjamin F. Tracy, U.S. secretary of the Navy (1889–93)
