= Joseph Barbara (mobster) =

Italian-American mobster (1905–1959)

- Barbara in the Federal District Court in Syracuse, New York, April 1959
- Born: Giuseppe Maria Barbara; August 9, 1905; Castellammare del Golfo, Sicily, Kingdom of Italy
- Died: June 17, 1959 (aged 53); Johnson City, New York, U.S.
- Resting place: Calvary Cemetery, Johnson City, New York, U.S.
- Other name: Joe the Barber
- Citizenship: United States
- Occupation: Caporegime
- Spouse: Josephine Vivona (m. 1933)
- Children: 4
- Allegiance: Buffalo crime family

Joseph Mario Barbara (/bɑːrˈbɛərə/; born Giuseppe Maria Barbara, Italian: [dʒuˈzɛppe maˈriːa barˈbaːra]; August 9, 1905 – June 17, 1959), also known as "Joe the Barber", was an Italian-American mobster who became caporegime of the Southern New York Tier territory of the Buffalo crime family, and hosted the abortive Apalachin meeting in 1957. Barbara died on June 17, 1959.

== Early life ==
Barbara was born on August 9, 1905, in Castellammare del Golfo, Sicily, to Giuseppe Barbara and Angela Galante. He immigrated to the United States in 1921, at the age of 16 and became a naturalized citizen in 1927. He was soon working as a hitman for the Buffalo crime family. During the 1930s, Barbara was arrested for several murders, including the 1933 murder of rival bootlegger Sam Wichner. Wichner had gone to Barbara's house for a business meeting, where Barbara allegedly strangled Wichner to death. However, law enforcement never obtained enough evidence to prosecute Barbara. Though some mistakenly believe he ascended to the top of the Bufalino family in 1940 through the murder of John Sciandra, Barbara was more than likely a caporegime in the Buffalo Maggadino Family. John Sciandra died in 1949 of natural causes.

Barbara married Josephine Vivona on June 24, 1933, in Endicott, New York, and fathered two sons, Joseph Jr. and Peter, and two daughters, Angeline, who died at the age of two, and Angela.

== Country estate ==
In 1944, Barbara bought a 58-acre (23 ha) parcel of land in the rural town of Apalachin, New York, and built an estate on 625 McFall Road for a total of $250,000. Barbara soon involved himself in local business circles and philanthropy. He joined the Elks Lodge, the Sons of Italy, and the Mutual Aid Society. When Barbara applied for a New York handgun permit, the police chief of Endicott, New York, served as a reference. In 1946, Barbara was convicted of illegally purchasing 300,000 pounds of sugar (intended for the manufacture of bootleg alcohol). Soon after this, Barbara entered the soft drink distribution business, buying a Canada Dry bottling plant. Barbara eventually gained control of the beer and soft drink market in Binghamton, New York. In 1956, a conference between dozens of mobsters was held at Barbara's estate; Barbara also suffered a heart attack that year.

=== The Apalachin meeting ===
In 1957, after taking control of the Luciano crime family from boss Frank Costello, boss Vito Genovese wanted to legitimize his new power by holding a national Cosa Nostra meeting. Genovese elected Buffalo, New York boss and Commission member, Stefano "the Undertaker" Magaddino, who in turn chose his caporegime Joseph Barbara and the Northeastern Pennsylvania boss Russell Bufalino to oversee all the arrangements.

On November 14, 1957, Barbara's estate in Apalachin was used again to hold a large meeting—over 100 mafiosi from the United States, Italy and Cuba. Cuba was one of the Apalachin topics of discussion, particularly the gambling and narcotics smuggling interests of La Cosa Nostra on the island. The international narcotics trade was also an important topic on the Apalachin agenda. The New York garment industry interests and rackets, such as loansharking to the business owners and control of garment center trucking, were other important topics on the Apalachin agenda.

A local state trooper named Edgar D. Croswell had been aware that Carmine Galante had been stopped by state troopers following a visit to Barbara's estate the previous year. A check of Galante by the troopers found that he was driving without a license and that he had an extensive criminal record in New York City. In the time preceding the November 1957 meeting, trooper Croswell had Barbara's house under occasional surveillance. He had become aware that Barbara's son was reserving rooms in local hotels along with the delivery of a large quantity of meat from a local butcher to the Barbara home. That made Croswell suspicious, and he therefore decided to keep an eye on Barbara's house. When the state police found many luxury cars parked at Barbara's home they began taking down license plate numbers. Having found that many of these cars were registered to known criminals, state police reinforcements came to the scene and began to set up a roadblock.

Having barely started their meeting, Bartolo Guccia, a Castellammare del Golfo native and Barbara employee, spotted a police roadblock while leaving Barbara's estate. Guccia later said he was returning to the Barbara home to check on a fish order. Some attendees attempted to drive away but were stopped by the roadblock. Others trudged through the fields and woods ruining their expensive suits before they were caught. Many Mafiosi escaped through the woods surrounding the Barbara estate.

Up to 50 men escaped, but over 60 were apprehended, including Commission members Genovese, Carlo Gambino, Joseph Profaci and Joseph Bonanno. Virtually all of them claimed they had heard Joseph Barbara was feeling ill and that they had visited him to wish him well.

==== Aftermath of Apalachin ====
Barbara was investigated by law enforcement and indicted for not testifying to a grand jury about what transpired at his home on November 14, 1957. In 1959, he was also charged with income tax evasion and submitting fraudulent corporation tax forms. On April 27, 1959, Barbara pled innocent to income tax charges before the Federal District Court in Syracuse, New York. Barbara's business interests declined, as he lost his lucrative bottling contract with Canada Dry. Barbara's health continued to deteriorate, suffering a heart attack on May 27, 1959, and another on June 17, 1959, at Wilson Memorial Hospital in Johnson City, New York, killing him. Following his death, Barbara's Apalachin estate was sold for $130,000, and, for a time, was used for sightseeing tours. Barbara is buried at Calvary Cemetery in Johnson City, New York.

The Apalachin meeting put the media spotlight directly on the secretive Cosa Nostra, triggering both state and federal hearings. As a result, Federal Bureau of Investigation (FBI) director J. Edgar Hoover could no longer deny the existence of the Cosa Nostra in the United States.
