= Constenze Valenti =

American crime boss

Constenze "Stanley" Valenti (February 8, 1926 – February 23, 2001) was boss of the criminal organization known as the Rochester crime family in the 1950s. As the head of the organization he oversaw gambling, prostitution and extortion rackets operating in the city of Rochester, New York.

Constenze and his brother Frank were among the 100 or more Mafiosi that attended the legendary Apalachin Meeting in 1957. At the time, Stanley was boss of the family. Joe Valachi identified the Valenti brothers as central figures in the Mafia when he became a government witness in 1963.

Valenti was born in Rochester, New York. He was married to the daughter of Antonio Ripepi, a very powerful capo in the Pittsburgh crime family. In 1958, Valenti refused to cooperate with law enforcement regarding questioning about the Apalachin Meeting. As a result, he was sentenced to 16 months in prison, during which time Jake Russo took the opportunity to seize control of the family.

He died on February 23, 2001, at his home in Victor, New York, at the age of 75.
