= Frank Valenti =

American mob boss

- Born: September 14, 1911; Pittsburgh, Pennsylvania
- Died: September 20, 2008 (aged 97); Sugar Land, Texas

Frank J. Valenti (September 14, 1911 – September 20, 2008) was boss of the criminal organization known as the Rochester crime family from 1964 to 1972. As the head of the organization he oversaw gambling, prostitution and extortion rackets operating in the city of Rochester, New York for 8 years.

== Criminal activities ==
Frank and his brother Constenze "Stanley" Valenti were among the 100+ Mafiosi that attended the legendary Apalachin Meeting in 1957. At the time, Frank was underboss of the family. Joe Valachi identified the Valenti brothers as central figures in the Mafia when he became a government witness in 1963. Valachi also stated that Frank was a soldier in the Bonanno crime family of New York City.

According to the U.S. Social Security Death Index, Frank was born in Pittsburgh, Pennsylvania, where he became a powerful crime figure throughout the 1930s–1950s. Valenti also owned a chain of Spaghetti Village restaurants in Pennsylvania. In 1958, Frank's brother Stanley was boss of the Rochester crime family and refused to cooperate with law enforcement regarding questioning about the Apalachin Meeting. As a result, Constenze was sentenced to 16 months in prison. Jake Russo took this opportunity to seize control of the family. Frank tried to intervene but was ordered out of the state for 3 years following a conviction for violation of the election laws. He moved back to Pittsburgh in the early 1960s, serving as a capo in the Pittsburgh crime family under John LaRocca. In 1964, with support from the LaRocca family, Valenti returned to Rochester and took control of the family. Jake Russo disappeared around that time, never to be seen again.

In 1970, Valenti informed Stefano Magaddino that the Rochester crime family would no longer pay tribute to Buffalo; the Rochester crime family was on its own, with support from the Pittsburgh crime family. He had a stint in federal prison on extortion charges, before moving to Arizona, and then Texas.

In October and November 1970, Valenti organized the Rochester bombings, in which nine buildings, including three Jewish synagogues and two black churches, were bombed as part of an effort to focus the attention of local authorities away from organized crime. Only one person was injured.

== Later life ==
Frank Valenti was a commissioned member of Buffalo, New York. He moved to Arizona in 1977, where he was allowed to retire.

He died on September 20, 2008, at a nursing home in Sugar Land outside Houston, at the age of 97.
