= Rochester bombings =

1970 bombings in New York, U.S.

- Location: Rochester and Henrietta, New York, United States
- Date: October 12, 1970- November 6, 1970
- Target: Synagogues, Black churches and government buildings
- Attack type: Bombing, false flag
- Deaths: 0
- Injuries: 1
- Perpetrator: Rochester Crime Family
- Motive: To divert police attention away from organized crime
- Convicted: Frank Valenti and Eugene DeFrancesco

The Rochester bombings were a series of bombing attacks between October 12 and November 6, 1970, in Rochester, New York. Beginning with the Columbus Day bombings on October, 12, the bombings were perpetrated by the Rochester crime family as false flag operations to draw the attention of local authorities away from organized crime. Over four weeks, they targeted nine buildings, including three Jewish synagogues and two black churches. Only one person was injured, a man living near the Federal Building who was cut by flying glass.

== Bombings ==
In 1964, mob boss Frank Valenti took control of the Rochester crime family from Jake Russo, a rival of Frank's brother Constenze "Stanley" Valenti. Six years later, Valenti devised the "Columbus Day bombings" as false flag operations to draw heat away from the crime family. Valenti hoped police would consider the bombings the work of anti-war activists and militants and focus attention away from organized crime.

The bombings spree began on Columbus Day, October 12, when a group of five bombs damaged the Rochester federal building, the Monroe County office building, two predominantly black storefront churches, and the private home of Dick Clark, an official with Local 832 of the trade union International Union of Operating Engineers.

The bombings subsequently drew attention and publicity to the local mob, so Valenti engineered additional bombings largely as a distraction.

The Columbus Day bombings were preceded on October 9 by the theft of 100 sticks of dynamite in Brockport, New York. Two men were arrested for the theft on October 19, and local authorities thought they had found the bombers responsible.

On October 27, explosions within six minutes of each another damaged two Orthodox Jewish synagogues in Rochester, Light of Israel Sephardic Center and Congregation Beth Sholom.

At 12:40am, a fuse bomb using a substantial amount of dynamite destroyed the back of Temple Beth Am, the third synagogue attacked in the previous 10 days. Temple Beth Am was the only synagogue in Henrietta, New York, a suburb of Rochester with 38,000 residents. The bombing demolished offices and a kitchen in the synagogue, and broke windows in the temple and in nearby homes. The damage was estimated to be between $35,000 (equivalent to $290,000 in 2025) and $50,000 (equivalent to $415,000 in 2025).

The only person injured in the eight explosions was a man living near the Federal Building who was cut by flying glass. There had been no warnings or explanations preceding or following the explosions.

== List of bombings ==
Date	Target	Details
October 12	Rochester federal building	Part of the Columbus Day bombings
October 12	Monroe County office building	Part of the Columbus Day bombings
October 12	Storefront church 1	Part of the Columbus Day bombings
October 12	Storefront church 2	Part of the Columbus Day bombings
October 12	Home of local union official	Part of the Columbus Day bombings
October 27	Light of Israel Sephardic Center	Explosion within 6 minutes of Beth Sholom Synagogue
October 27	Beth Sholom Synagogue	Explosion within 6 minutes of Light of Israel
November 6	Temple Beth Am (Henrietta)	Third synagogue bombing in 10 days

== Aftermath ==
By November 6, more than 40 investigators from the Monroe County Sheriff's office, Rochester Police Department, New York State Police, and the FBI were working the case. However, local authorities admitted that they had no leads or indications that the bombings were connected, except for the fact that they all occurred between midnight and 1am.

In 1975, Valenti was arrested but only ended up serving probation in connection with the bombings. His associate Eugene DeFrancesco was sentenced to 11 years in federal prison.

== See also ==
- List of attacks on Jewish institutions in the United States
