= James E. Casale =

James E. Casale (c.1890 – 1958) was an Italian-born American architect best known for his work on atmospheric theaters, including the Polk Theatre (Lakeland, Florida). and the Pulitzer Mansion in New York. Casale also designed the limestone town house at 60 East 86th in New York, and the Britton Cinema in Tampa, Florida.

Casale was born in Villarosa, Italy in approximately 1890 and received his architectural education from Cooper Union and Columbia University. He was well known for his work remodeling upper-class homes in New York City, mostly on the East side of New York. His most prominent conversions were those of the Villard Houses, designated New York City Landmarks, into the offices of the Roman Catholic Archdiocese (now part of the Palace Hotel),the conversion of the Pulitzer mansion at 7-15 East 73rd Street-1206-into apartments, and the conversion of the Lamont house at 107 East 70th Street into the Headquarters of the Visiting Nurse Service of New York.

He was married to Grace Casale and together they had two daughters, Grace and Jane Kathryn. He died in 1958.
