= Michael James Genovese =

American mobster (1919–2006)

Michael James Genovese (April 9, 1919 – October 31, 2006) was an alleged boss of the Pittsburgh crime family. References to Michael Genovese as the brother of New York mob boss Vito Genovese are to a different Michael Genovese; Michael James Genovese was allegedly stated to be a first cousin of Vito Genovese.

== Early years ==
Genovese was born to Anthony and Ursula Genovese in East Liberty, Pittsburgh Pennsylvania. He had two brothers, Felix and Fiore, and three sisters, Virginia, Frances and Angeline. In his early years, Genovese was arrested for robbery and carrying concealed weapons. Among his legitimate businesses was a car wash. According to a report by the then Pennsylvania Crime Commission, Genovese once controlled the Numbers Game in Western Pennsylvania. His climb through the Pittsburgh crime family included stints as caporegime and underboss to John Sebastian LaRocca, who became boss in 1956. In November 1957, Genovese accompanied LaRocca to the abortive Apalachin meeting of mob bosses in Apalachin, New York with Gabriel "Kelly" Mannarino. In 1978, facing poor health, LaRocca formed a three-man commission of Genovese, Mannarino, and Joseph "Jo Jo" Pecora to take over day-to-day operations of the family.

== Family boss ==
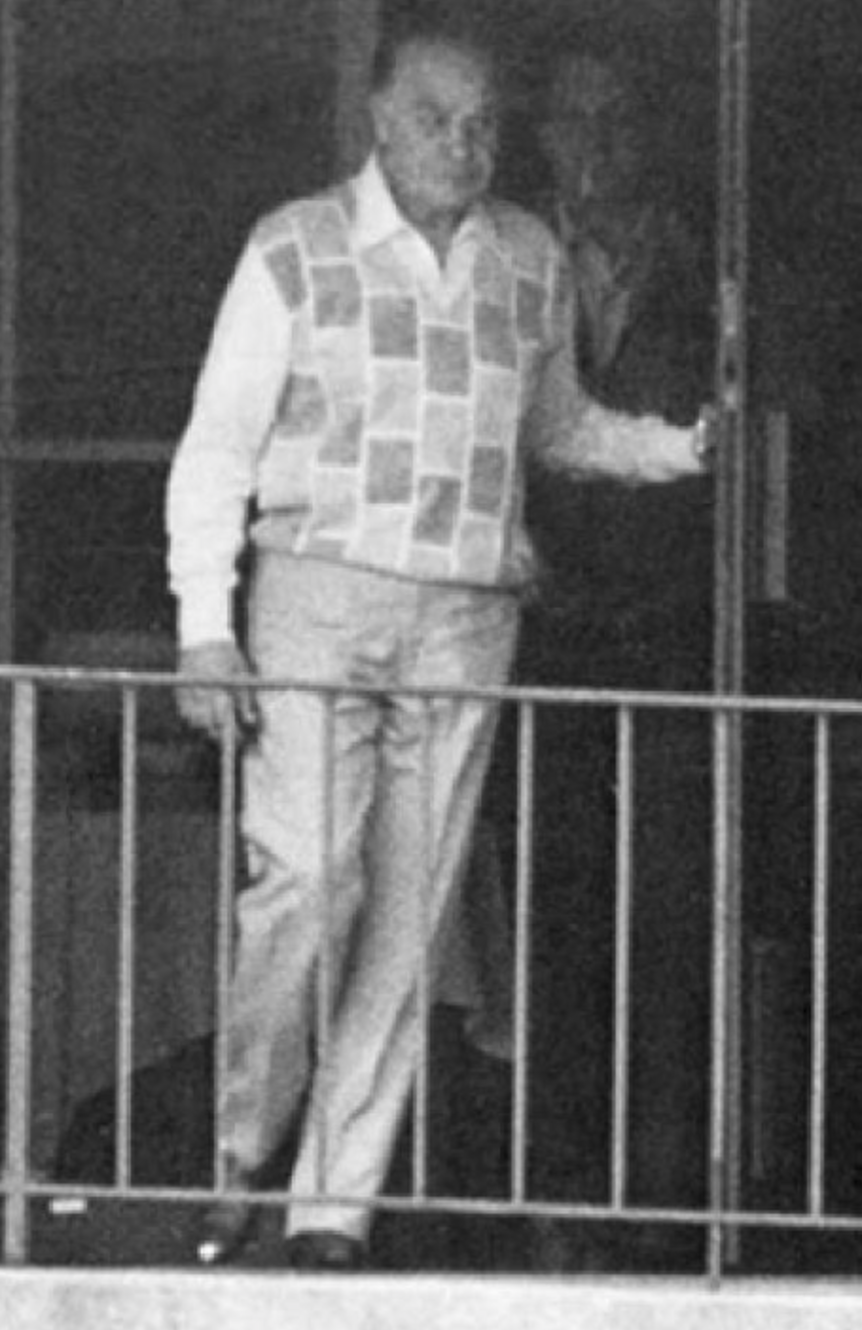
FBI surveillance photo of Genovese exiting the Holiday House in 1984

Within a year, with the death of Mannarino and the imprisonment of Pecora, Genovese headed the commission. Under Genovese's reign, the Pittsburgh family dominated illegal gambling in Western Pennsylvania, the West Virginia Panhandle, and Eastern Ohio. The family was also involved in major drug trafficking, loan sharking, scams, and theft in Pittsburgh. However, the Mafia Commission in New York would not allow Genovese to recruit new members into the family; he could only replace those who died or retired. Three years after Genovese took control, Pecora died at age 68. In 1985, the Federal Bureau of Investigation (FBI) described the Pittsburgh family as being one of the lower-ranked crime families. However, in a 1995 report, the FBI implied that due to large-scale federal prosecutions of New York's Five Families and the Chicago Outfit, the Pittsburgh organization was one of the stronger families in the Eastern United States.

== Prosecutions ==
Age and federal prosecutors began catching up with organized crime in Pittsburgh by the early 1990s. In March 1990, underboss Charles "Chucky" Porter (Genovese's right-hand man) and capo Louis Raucci Sr. were indicted for distribution of narcotics, extortion, conspiracy to commit murder, robbery, gambling and racketeering. Police stakeouts at L.A. Motor in Verona, Pennsylvania where Genovese worked, revealed him meeting almost daily with Porter and Raucci. However, surveillance equipment never recorded Genovese making any incriminating statements. Genovese was always careful to go outside when talking to his mob subordinates. Though not indicted, Genovese was named as the head of the Pittsburgh crime family during testimony. Porter and Raucci were both convicted of all charges at the trial.

== Death ==
In 1990, Genovese was suspected of ordering the takeover of territories of Youngstown and Cleveland, formerly held by the Cleveland crime family. On October 31, 2006, Genovese died of natural causes at his home in West Deer Township, Pennsylvania.
