= Rochester crime family =

- Founded: c. 1950s
- Founders: Buffalo crime family
- Named after: Constenze "Stanley" Valenti
- Founding location: Rochester, New York, United States
- Years active: c. 1950s–1993
- Territory: Primarily the Rochester metropolitan area, with additional territory throughout Western New York
- Ethnicity: Italians as "made men" and other ethnicities as associates
- Activities: Racketeering, loansharking, gambling, extortion, prostitution, arson, bombing, assault and murder
- Allies: Bonanno crime family; Buffalo crime family; Pittsburgh crime family
- Rivals: Buffalo crime family; and various other gangs in the Rochester area

The Rochester crime family, also known as the Valenti crime family or the Rochester Mafia, was an Italian American Mafia crime family based in Rochester, New York and throughout the Greater Rochester area. The crime family was founded in the 1950s and named after its original boss, Constenze "Stanley" Valenti.

== History ==
The Rochester family's first well known official boss was Constenze "Stanley" Valenti. In 1957, after the Apalachin Conference, Stan and his brother Frank were both jailed for civil contempt, because they refused to answer questions about the meeting. In 1958, Stan was sentenced to 16 months in prison, and Jake Russo became the next boss.

=== Splitting from Buffalo ===
In 1964, Frank Valenti returned to Rochester with his brother Stan, and Pittsburgh associate Angelo Vaccaro. Frank became an associate in the Pittsburgh crime family in John LaRocca's family. Stan Valenti was married to the daughter of Antonio Ripepi, who was a capo in the Pittsburgh family. This time, Frank Valenti was taking over the Rochester family. By the end of the year, Russo went missing and his body has never been found. In 1970, Valenti wiped out the last Russo soldier, Billy Lupo. Also, Frank Valenti told Buffalo crime family boss Stefano "The Undertaker" Magaddino that Rochester would become an independent family. Prior to this, Rochester was just a crew which answered to the Magaddino's Buffalo crime family.

=== The Valenti regime ===
Valenti created a well-organized crime family by promoting Samuel Russotti to underboss, Rene Picarreto to consigliere and Salvatore Gingello, Dominic Celestino, Thomas Didio, Angelo Vaccaro and Dominic Chirico as his capos. His most trusted ally was capo Chirico, who he gave special tasks to carry out. He divided up the family's illegal activities of gambling, extortion, loan sharking, insurance fraud, arson, narcotics and weapon trafficking among his capos to ensure peace.

In 1970, the Rochester crime family bombed nine buildings, including three Jewish synagogues and two black churches, as part of the Rochester bombings designed to focus the attention of local authorities away from organized crime. Only one person was injured.

In 1972, Valenti was approached by his underboss Samuel "Red" Russotti, his consigliere Rene Piccarreto, and highly powerful capo Salvatore "Sammy G" Gingello. The three accused Valenti of skimming profits and asked him to step down as boss; he refused. Valenti felt that the Pittsburgh family would back him and the Chirico crew up with muscle. Unknown to him was that his consigliere, Picarreto, had made a secret alliance with members of the Bonanno crime family. Valenti's most trusted capo and bodyguard, Domenic Chirico, was shot and killed on Augustine Street. Instead of fighting he was allowed to move to Phoenix, Arizona and retire. After retiring Valenti was arrested and convicted of extortion, he later died on September 20, 2008.

=== The Russotti era ===
After Valenti fled the city, Samuel Russotti became boss, Piccarreto remained as consigliere, and Gingello became the underboss. The family was strong until January 1977 when the police fabricated evidence to indict all the upper echelon. The convictions put Russotti, Piccaretto, Gingello, Thomas Marotta and Eugene DeFrancesco away for murdering Vincent Massaro with a 25 years to life sentenced. When this happened, Thomas Didio became the acting boss. Russotti thought he would be able to manipulate Didio, but he really just created a monster. Didio began demoting all the Russotti loyalists while receiving advice from imprisoned former boss Valenti. When the truth came out about the fabricated evidence, all the top guys got out of prison. This created an "A team and B Team" war. Part of the "A team" was Russotti, Piccarreto, Gingello, Richard Marino, Thomas Marotta and others. Part of the "B Team" was Thomas Didio, Rosario Chirico (Domenic's brother), Stan Valenti, Angelo Vaccaro and others.

On April 23, 1978, Salvatore "Sammy G" Gingello was killed when a bomb was detonated when he entered his car, which was parked across from the Stillson St. restaurant, Ben's Cafe Society. On July 6, 1978, Thomas Didio was murdered by a gunman who was using a machine gun. After these two murders the FBI decided it was time to crack down on the situation, with the Racketeer Influenced and Corrupt Organizations Act (RICO) coming into play they took down most of the remaining key players. In 1988, Angelo Amico and Loren Piccarreto were both indicted under RICO. Angelo Amico was the acting boss, and Loren Piccarreto (son of Rene Piccarreto) was the underboss.

Amico pleaded guilty to racketeering, conspiracy and tax evasion in October 1988, and was sentenced to 14 years in prison. Loren Piccarreto, Joseph Geniola and Donald Paone were convicted and imprisoned in early 1989. The RICO convictions of the late 1980s effectively dismantled the Rochester family. Russotti died of a heart attack in federal prison in Michigan on June 25, 1993, at the age of 81.

Following his release from prison in July 1996, Thomas Marotta led around half of the remaining former members of the defunct Rochester family in joining the Bonanno family. Others, including Rene Piccarreto and Angelo Amico, rejoined the Buffalo family.

== Historical leadership ==
=== Boss (official and acting) ===
- c. 1950s–1958 – Constenze "Stanley" Valenti – imprisoned in 1958; released in 1960; died on February 23, 2001
- 1958–1964 – Jake Russo – murdered
- 1964–1972 – Frank Valenti – retired, died on September 20, 2008
- 1972–1993 – Samuel "Red" Russotti – imprisoned in 1984; died in 1993
  - Acting 1977–1978 – Thomas Didio – murdered in July 1978 during the "A & B Wars"
  - Acting 1977–1978 – Salvatore "Sammy G" Gingello – murdered on April 23, 1978, during the "A & B Wars"
  - Acting 1988 – Angelo Amico – arrested in 1988; released in 1993
  - Acting 1988 – Loren Piccarreto – son of Rene Piccarreto; arrested 1988; released in 1994

=== Underboss ===
- 1964–1972 – Samuel "Red" Russotti – promoted to boss
- 1972–1978 – Salvatore "Sammy G" Gingello – promoted to acting boss
- 1978–1984 – Richard Marino – convicted imprisoned for murder
- 1984–1988 – Loren Piccarreto – promoted acting boss

=== Consigliere ===
- 1964–1984 – Rene Piccarreto – imprisoned in 1984; released in 2007; died in March 2014.

== Former members ==
- Angelo Amico – former soldier and acting boss. According to the government in March 1986, Amico was intercepted on a wire with vice-president of Teamster Union 398 Angelo Misuraca, telling him 'no one gets moved without checking with me first.' He died in March 2011 at the age of 79.
- William Barton – former soldier. In 1969, Barton was charged with interstate transportation of stolen property in connection with an armed robbery. In January 1980, Barton was accused of federal conspiracy, racketeering and weapons charges.
- Eugene DiFrancesco – former soldier and alleged hitman. In June 1975, DiFrancesco was indicted on charges arising out of a series of bombings that occurred in the Rochester area on Columbus Day in 1970. A second indictment filed in April 1976 accused DiFrancesco of involvement in an "arson-for-hire" ring operating in the Rochester area, including the death of a potential witness, Samuel DiGaetano. In February 1978, he was released from prison after police were caught fabricating evidence following the murder of Jimmy Massaro. In March 1978, DiFrancesco was found guilty of racketeering and bombings. One week later, the court sentenced DiFrancesco to concurrent ten-year terms of imprisonment on the two racketeering counts, to be served concurrently with sentences totalling nine years on the bombing counts. He died in 2009 at the age of 75.
- John "Johnny Flowers" Fiorino – former capo under Samuel Russotti who served as vice-president of Teamster Union Local 398 in Rochester. He was murdered by Joseph Sullivan in December 1981 at the Blue Gardenia restaurant.
- Frank Frassetto – former soldier. In March 1981, Frassetto was convicted of a series of bombings and attempted bombings in Rochester, New York, between December 1977 and June 1978. In February 2000, Frassetto was arrested for participating in a heroin transaction worth a kilo. In March 2006, Frassetto pleaded guilty to drug conspiracies.
- Loren Piccarreto – former soldier and acting boss who served as shop steward of Teamster Union Labourer Local 435. According to the government, Piccarreto was heavily involved in illegal gambling operations and extortion protection payments from gambling club owners. In November 1988, former Rochester family soldier and government witness, Anthony Oliveri, implicated Piccarreto of being inducted into the Rochester family since at least 1978.
- Rocco Reitano – soldier born approximately 1936. In May 1987, Reitano was convicted of operating an illegal gambling and was sentenced to 1 year imprisonment and fined $2,500.
- Dominic Taddeo – soldier and hitman. In January 1992, Taddeo pleaded guilty to committing 3 murders during the 1980s, attempting to murder 2 individuals and conspiracy to murder another man. Taddeo also pleaded guilty to drug offences, corruption and weapon charges. In May 1982, Taddeo shot and killed Nicholas Mastrodonato at a gold and silver purchasing store. In August 1982, Taddeo murdered Gerald Pelusio in front of a townhouse. In April 1983, Taddeo attempted to shoot and kill Thomas Marotta, another attempt is made on Marotta in November 1983 but he also manages to survive. In August 1983, Taddeo fatally shot Dino Tortatice outside the home of Tortatice's mother. In February 1987, Taddeo is indicted on illegal weapon charges and is granted bail of $25,000. In April 1992, he was sentenced to 24 years for racketeering and homicide.

== Government informants and witnesses ==
- Joseph "Spike" LaNovara – former soldier. He was a part of Frank Valenti's regime and became an informer in the early 1970s after facing murder charges.
- Angelo Monachino – former soldier. It is believed he participated in the December 14, 1970 murder of William Constable. He owned a construction company named Barmon Construction. Monachino also served as an accomplice in the murder of Jimmy "the Hammer" Massaro, as he allowed the murder to take place inside of a garage located at his business property; Massaro was shot 9 times. He agreed to become an informer in 1975. In September 1975, he was arrested along with former Rochester mob boss Frank Valenti, and Jimmy Massaro who was murdered in November 1973, and were accused of burning down a warehouse and receiving $80,000 insurance money in September 1971.
- Anthony Oliveri – former soldier. It is noted that he was a close friend of fellow Rochester crime family member, Anthony Columbo. It is believed he and Columbo conspired to murder Angelo DeMarco in March 1978, as the pair had parked their car in front of DeMarco's home and were in a car chase with law enforcement on the same night, a .357 Magnum and a 12 gauge shotgun were found in the car. Oliveri participated in the July 1978 murder of Thomas Didio, who was murdered by Anthony Columbo with a machine gun, inside of a motel in Victor, New York. He was allegedly inducted into the Rochester mob in December 1978. He became an informer since at least in 1980. He testified in December 1984 against several members of the Rochester crime family.

== List of murders committed by the Rochester crime family ==
| Name | Date | Reason |
|---|---|---|
| Jake Russo | September-December, 1964 | Russo, the acting boss of the Rochester family for Frank Valenti, was strangled to death in the basement of the Pizza Stop, a restaurant owned by Frank Valenti located on 131 State Street in downtown Rochester, according to information from Rene Piccarreto Sr, the consigliere of the family from between the 1960s until 1984. It is believed following the release from prison in September 1964 for election fraud in 1961, Valenti seized control of the Rochester family, and had Russo removed. |
| Dominic "The Deacon" Alloco | February 24, 1965 | Alloco was murdered on orders of Frank Valenti, whom had served as boss of the Rochester family from between 1964 and 1972, as it was believed Alloco was revealed to be a police informant. |
| William "Billy" Lupo | February 18, 1970 | Lupo had served as a driver to Rochester family boss, Frank Valenti, and was shot 4 times in the head. Lupo's wife was placed into the witness protection program after testifying against Valenti. |
| Dominic Chirico | June 5, 1972 | Chirico was a soldier for the Rochester family and was a close associate of former Rochester family boss, Frank Valenti. Chirico was killed by a shotgun blast, outside of the home of his girlfriend. |
| Ernie White | April 3, 1973 | White was an associate of the Rochester family. White was murdered the day after he had served on an armed-robbery crew which targeted the Department of Motor Vehicles office in Irondequoit, New York. |
| Vincent "Jimmy the Hammer" Massaro | November 23, 1973 | Massaro had served as a Frank Valenti loyalist and it is believed he was murdered for not following orders for the new Rochester family administration, and he was found in the trunk of his car on November 28, 1973 in Monroe County, New York. |
| William "Zeke" Zimmerman | December 1974 | Zimmerman was an associate of the Rochester family and later became a police informant. He was blamed for encouraging Charles Monacchino, Angelo Monacchino and Joe "Spike" LaNovara to cooperate with authorities following charges of the November 1973 homicide of Vincent Massaro. |
| John "Johnny Flowers" Fiorino | December 17, 1981 | Fiorino had served as a captain for the Rochester family around the time of his murder, and he was also the Teamsters Vice-President in Rochester. It is believed Fiorino was murdered by John "Mad Dog" Sullivan outside of the Blue Gardenia restaurant. |
| Nick Mastrodonato | May 25, 1982 | Mastrodonato was shot and killed by fellow Rochester family member Dominic "Trigger Dom" Taddeo. |
| Gerry Pelusio | August 26, 1982 | Pelusio was gunned down by Dominic Taddeo using a shotgun as part of the Alphabet Mafia War. |
| Dino Tortatice | April 2, 1983 | Tortatice was possibly murdered by Dominic Taddeo outside of his home as part of the Alphabet Mafia war. |

== See also ==
- Crime in New York (state)
- List of Italian Mafia crime families
