= Villarosa =

- Comune
- Comune di Villarosa
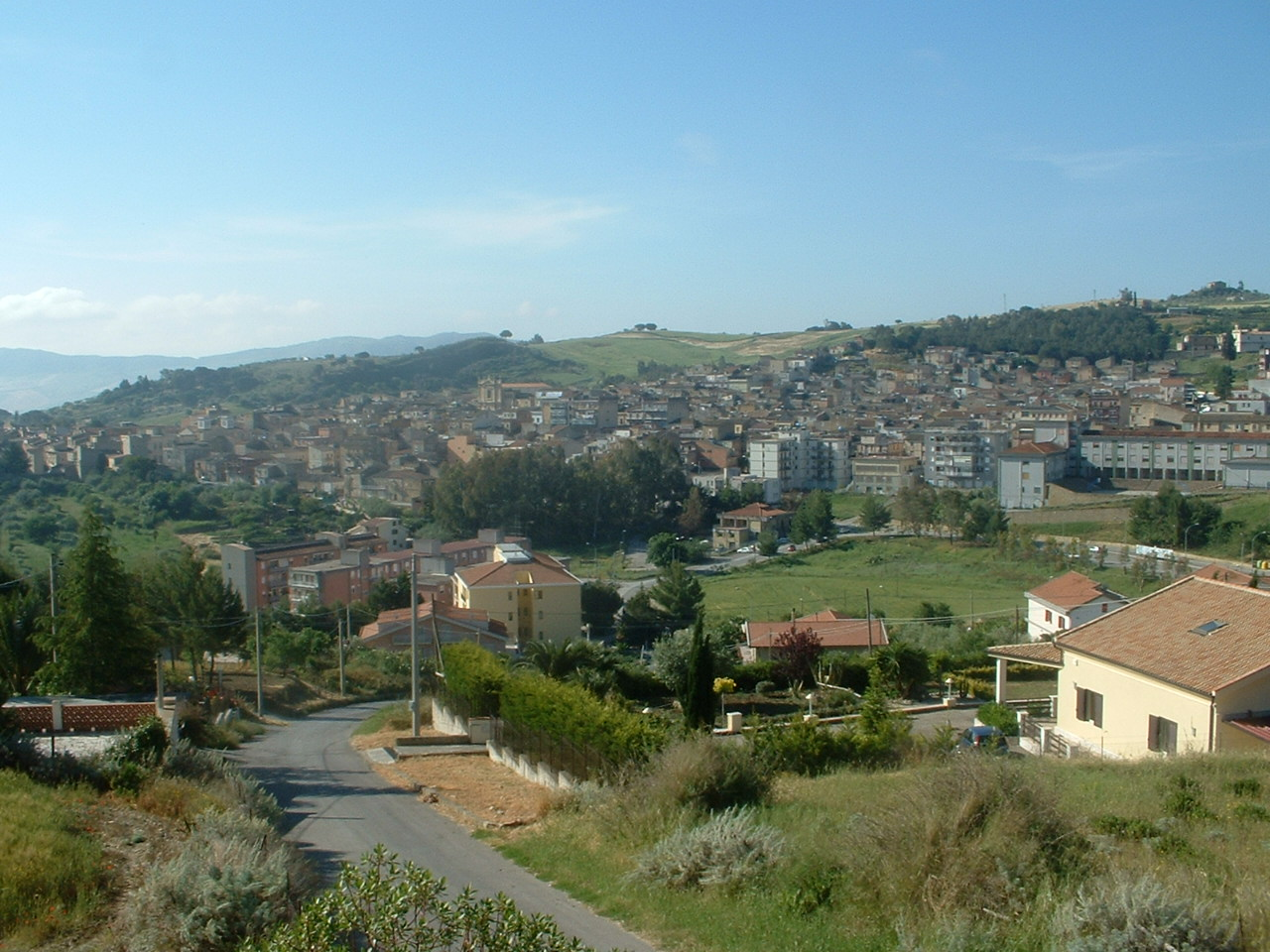
- View of Villarosa

- Location within Italy Location within Sicily
- Coordinates: 37°35′N 14°10′E
- Country: Italy
- Region: Sicily
- Province: Enna (EN)
- Frazioni: Villapriolo

Government
  - Mayor: Giuseppe Fasciana

Area
  - Total: 54.89 km^{2} (21.19 sq mi)
- Elevation: 523 m (1,716 ft)

Population (2026)
  - Total: 4,271
  - Density: 77.81/km^{2} (201.5/sq mi)
- Demonym: Villarosani
- Time zone: UTC+1 (CET)
  - Summer (DST): UTC+2 (CEST)
- Postal code: 94010
- Dialing code: 0935
- Patron saint: St. James
- Saint day: August 10
- Website: Official website

Villarosa is a town and comune (municipality) in the Province of Enna in the autonomous island region of Sicily in southern Italy, located about 10 kilometres (6.2 mi) west of Enna and 90 kilometres (56 mi) southeast of Palermo. It has 4,271 inhabitants.

Villarosa borders the municipalities of Alimena, Bompietro, Calascibetta, Enna, and Santa Caterina Villarmosa.

== Demgoraphics ==
As of 2026, the population is 4,271, of which 48.3% are males, and 51.7% are females. Minors make up 13.9% of the population, and seniors make up 28.3%.

Historical population

Year	Pop.	±%
1861	6,814	—
1871	7,019	+3.0%
1881	9,792	+39.5%
1901	12,678	+29.5%
1911	11,939	−5.8%
1921	10,448	−12.5%
1931	10,000	−4.3%
1936	10,211	+2.1%

Year	Pop.	±%
1951	11,059	+8.3%
1961	9,882	−10.6%
1971	6,881	−30.4%
1981	6,237	−9.4%
1991	6,205	−0.5%
2001	5,696	−8.2%
2011	5,130	−9.9%
2021	4,450	−13.3%

Source: ISTAT

=== Immigration ===
As of 2025, immigrants make up 8.5% of the population. The 5 largest foreign countries of birth are Belgium, Romania, Germany, Tunisia, and Egypt.

== International relations ==
=== Twin towns – sister cities ===
- Morlanwelz, Belgium, since 2002
- Le Quesnoy, France, since 2006

== Notable people ==
- James E. Casale (1890–1958), architect
- John LaRocca (1901–1984), mobster
- Mike Fadale, actor and chef
