= Pittsburgh crime family =

Italian-American Mafia crime family

- Founded: c. 1888; 138 years ago
- Founder: Salvatore "Banana King" Catanzaro
- Named after: Sebastian "Big John" LaRocca
- Founding location: Pittsburgh, Pennsylvania, United States
- Years active: c. 1888–2021
- Territory: Primarily Greater Pittsburgh (especially New Kensington, Arnold and Bloomfield), with additional territory throughout Western Pennsylvania, Northeast Ohio and the Northern panhandle of West Virginia, as well as Las Vegas, San Diego and Havana
- Ethnicity: Italians as "made men" and other ethnicities as associates
- Activities: Racketeering, gambling, loansharking, extortion, labor racketeering, drug trafficking, money laundering, prostitution, assault, and murder
- Allies: Bufalino crime family; Buffalo crime family; Chicago Outfit; Cleveland crime family; Detroit Partnership; Gambino crime family; Genovese crime family; Kansas City crime family; Lucchese crime family; Philadelphia crime family; Rochester crime family; Trafficante crime family; Outlaws MC; Pagan's MC
- Rivals: Various gangs in the Pittsburgh area

The Pittsburgh crime family, also known as the LaRocca crime family or the Pittsburgh Mafia, was an Italian American Mafia crime family based in Pittsburgh, Pennsylvania, and throughout the Greater Pittsburgh area. The organization formed during the late 1880s under Salvatore "Banana King" Catanzaro and was named after Sebastian "Big John" LaRocca, the family's longest-serving boss, from 1956 until his death in 1984.

The Pittsburgh family rose to prominence during the Prohibition era under the leadership of Stefano Monastero, who became boss in 1925, by controlling a large distribution operation of bootlegging supplies from warehouses on Pittsburgh's North Side. Monastero's leadership was cut short on August 6, 1929, he and his brother Sam were murdered. The family was taken over by Giuseppe "Joseph" Siragusa, a successful local bootlegger, who paid tribute to New York Mafia boss Salvatore Maranzano in order to operate in Allegheny County. Siragusa was murdered on September 13, 1931, as Maranzano's rival Lucky Luciano gained power in New York. John Bazzano succeeded as boss of the Pittsburgh Mafia after Siragusa's murder, and his reign was defined by his rivalry with the Volpe brothers. After Bazzano killed three of the Volpe brothers on July 29, 1932, the two surviving brothers complained to the Commission in New York. As Bazzano's killings had not been sanctioned by the Commission, he was lured to New York, where he was stabbed and strangled to death in August 1932. Bazzano was succeeded by Vincenzi Capizzi followed by Frank Amato Sr., who expanded the influence of the crime family beyond Allegheny County.

After Amato stepped down to become underboss in 1956, John LaRocca took over the Pittsburgh family. Under LaRocca's leadership, the crime family became powerful in Pittsburgh's labor unions and established rackets in Northeast Ohio, in which it partnered with the Cleveland crime family. LaRocca also brought the Pittsburgh Mafia into an agreement with the Trafficante crime family of Tampa to manage the Sans Souci casino in Havana. As LaRocca battled ill-health in the late 1970s and early 1980s, leadership of the Pittsburgh family was overseen by a series of acting leaders. LaRocca died from natural causes on December 3, 1984.

Michael James Genovese became the boss following LaRocca's death, and aggressively pursued the drug trade. Although Genovese avoided prosecution, his decision to lead the Pittsburgh Mafia into narcotics trafficking led to the convictions of senior members as well as younger associates, eliminating the organization's line of ascension. The Commission also forbade the Pittsburgh family from inducting new members. The convictions, along with general attrition, resulted in the crime family becoming defunct. The boss and last known "made" member of the family, Thomas "Sonny" Ciancutti, died in 2021.

== History ==
=== Prohibition era bosses ===
At the turn of the 20th century, Italian criminals in the city of Pittsburgh were divided into two ethnic factions: the "Sicilians" and the "Neapolitans". Territory within the city was also divided, as the Sicilian clans controlled the North and South Sides while the Neapolitan clans controlled the East End.

The earliest known Sicilian boss in Pittsburgh was Salvatore "Banana King" Catanzaro, who started his fruit and produce company in Downtown Pittsburgh in 1888. Catanzaro served as the treasurer for the Italian Red Cross Society and also worked alongside a network of Sicilian Mafia bosses in Western Pennsylvania. In 1914, after being injured in a stabbing attack, Catanzaro stepped down as boss; he later died on February 17, 1916. This allowed Catanzaro's protege, Gregorio Conti, to assume control of his crime family, based in the Hill District. As the new boss, Conti waged a war against the Neapolitan factions and by 1917, which ultimately resulted in the Neapolitans either joining the Sicilians or disbanding.

In 1919, the United States government passed the Eighteenth Amendment declaring the production, transportation and sale of intoxicating liquors illegal. Months later, Congress passed the Volstead Act declaring that liquor, wine and beer all qualified as intoxicating liquors and were therefore prohibited, effective January 17, 1920. On September 24, 1919, Conti was shot and killed. Following his death, his nephew Peppino Cusumano led the family, but worked in the shadow of Salvatore Calderone, the most powerful boss in Western Pennsylvania. Calderone controlled the Mafia Network from Apollo, located 30 miles northeast of Pittsburgh. On January 17, 1920, Prohibition began in the United States, banning all production, importation, transportation and sale of alcoholic beverages.

Prohibition presented a very lucrative opportunity for Cusumano and Calderone, as they began bootlegging—the illegal manufacture, sale and transportation—of alcohol. As bootlegging operations expanded throughout the U.S., violence erupted as criminals fought for dominance. Within the city of Pittsburgh, the Italian neighborhoods of Larimer, Homewood, the Hill District and the downtown area became battlegrounds as the Mafia factions fought for territorial control of bootlegging rackets. In the suburbs of Pittsburgh, the factions fought for control of New Kensington, Arnold, Wilkinsburg, McKees Rocks, Wilmerding and Braddock. It was recorded that between 1926 and 1933, there were over 200 murders in Allegheny County.

By 1925, Calderone retired and Stefano Monastero became the new boss of the Pittsburgh family. Monastero controlled a large organization of bootlegging supplies throughout several warehouses on Pittsburgh's North Side. During his reign he was suspected of ordering the bombings of rival bootleggers facilities and for ordering the murder of his competitor, Luigi "Big Gorilla" Lamendola, in May 1927. Monastero and his brother Sam were themselves murdered on August 6, 1929, in front of St. John's hospital. Pittsburgh police suspected that Joe "the Ghost" Pangallo was responsible for ordering Monastero's murder, but were unable to prove it.

After Monastero's murder, Giuseppe Siragusa became the new boss of the Pittsburgh family. Siragusa had emigrated from Sicily in 1910, landing in Brooklyn, New York and later settling in Pittsburgh, where he manufactured and traded in illegal alcohol. He was nicknamed the "Yeast Baron" after becoming one of the largest suppliers of yeast to illegal beermakers in the area. Siragusa maintained a close alliance with the Castellammarese clan in New York City and paid tribute to the clan's boss, Salvatore Maranzano. On September 13, 1931, Siragusa was murdered in his Squirrel Hill home, just days after Maranzano had been murdered.

=== Bazzano against the Volpe brothers ===
After the murder of Siragusa, the family came under the control of John Bazzano. Bazzano had immigrated to the United States from Calabria in the 1890s and built a bootlegging empire selling yeast and sugar to home breweries, which allowed them to manufacture illegal beer. He was a protégé of early Pittsburgh mobster Nicola Gentile and learned to keep a low profile. He owned a coffee shop in the Middle Hill and a mansion in Mt. Lebanon, a neighborhood outside of Pittsburgh. Bazzano formed an alliance with the eight Volpe brothers, the leaders of the "Neapolitan faction" who controlled illegal rackets throughout the Turtle Creek Valley and Wilmerding.

Bazzano became aggravated when the Volpe brothers began expanding into East Liberty and the North Side. On July 29, 1932, he sent a hit team to murder the brothers; the team murdered three of them. Two of the surviving brothers went to the "Commission" in New York, and it was decided Bazzano would be held responsible for his unsanctioned hit. On August 8, 1932, Bazzano's body was found in Red Hook, Brooklyn. He had been stabbed and strangled to death.

Vincenzo Capizzi became the new Pittsburgh boss, but he eventually resigned in 1937 and was replaced by Frank Amato. Amato began expanding his influence over the gambling rackets in and around Allegheny County, and formed a strong alliance with the Genovese crime family in New York City, who represented Pittsburgh at meetings of the Commission. Amato ruled until 1956, when he fell ill from a kidney ailment and stepped down to become underboss.

=== Reign of Big John LaRocca ===
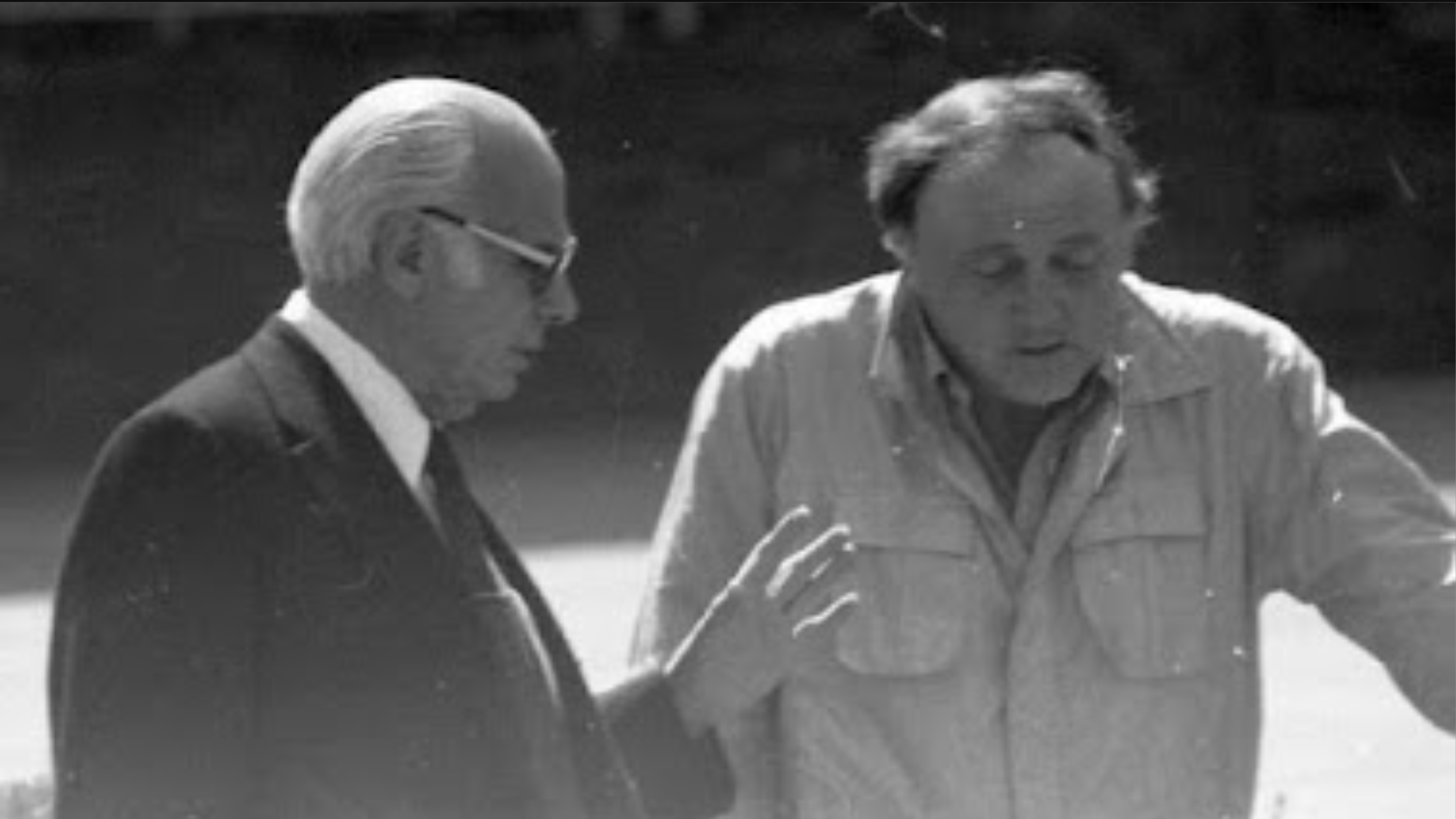
FBI surveillance photo of LaRocca (Left) and Thomas Ciancutti (Right) at Allegheny Car Wash on June 9, 1980.

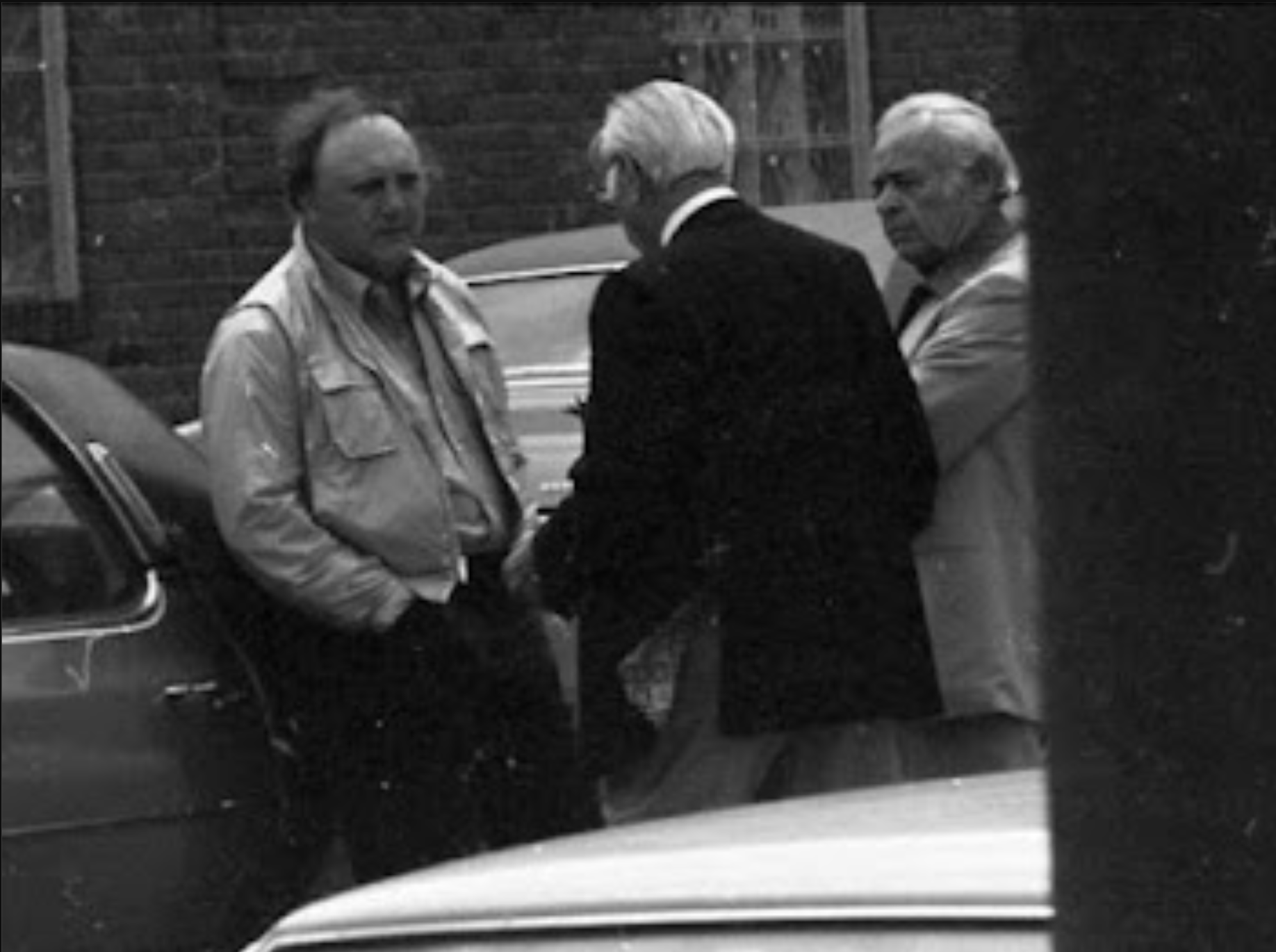
FBI photo of Thomas Ciancutti (L) John LaRocca (C) and Louis Volpe (R) on June 9, 1980, at Allegheny Car Wash

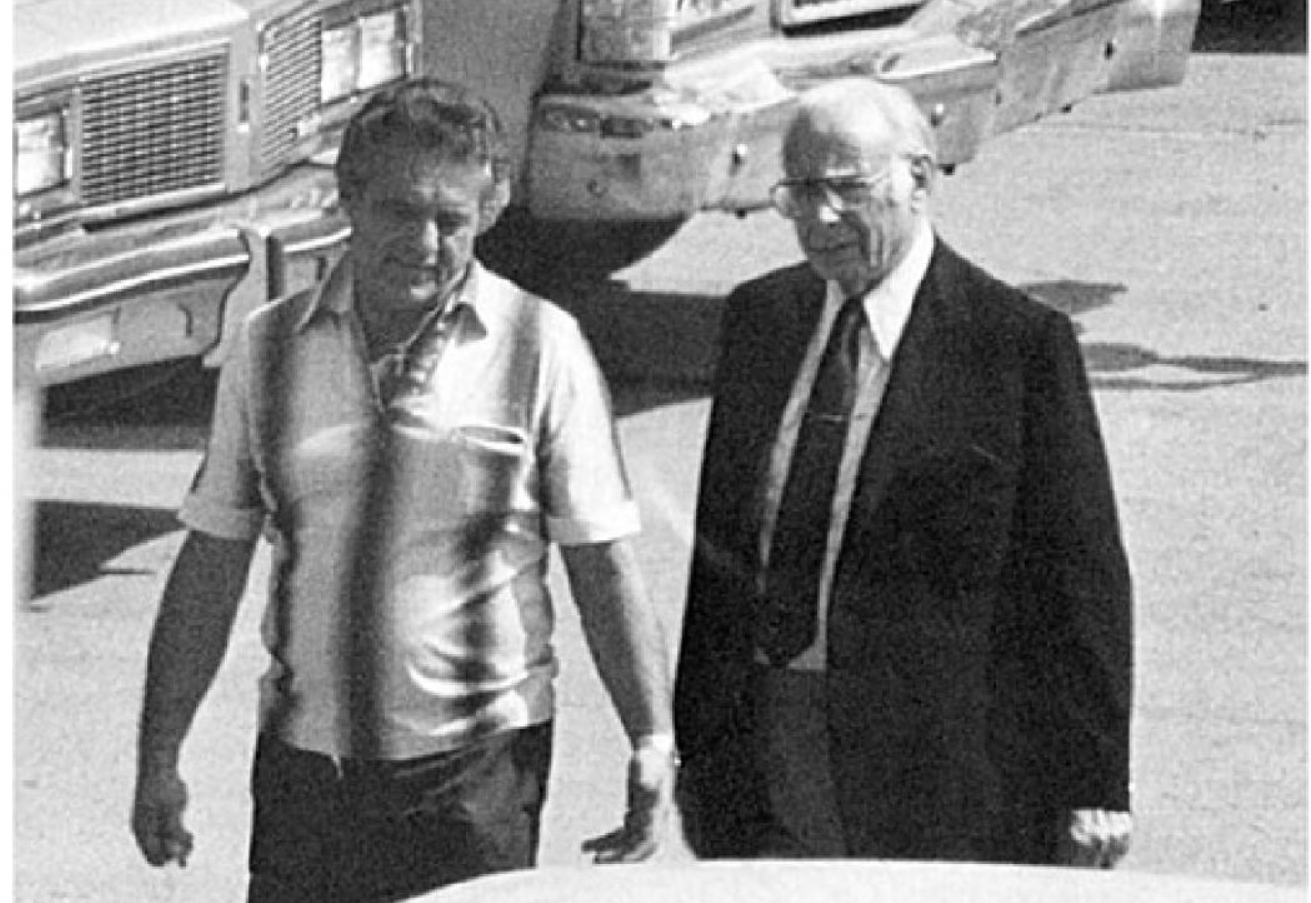
FBI surveillance photo of John LaRocca (right) and Anthony Capizzi (left) at Allegheny Car Wash in 1984

Following the end of Amato's reign, Sebastian "Big John" LaRocca became the boss of the Pittsburgh family and remained in the role for nearly thirty years. LaRocca had emigrated from Sicily in 1910, he moved to Pittsburgh with his wife in 1933. He started a business selling beer equipment and concrete blocks in Oakland. LaRocca later gained control of multiple illegal rackets and was convicted on several occasions for larceny, receiving stolen property and operating an illegal lottery. In 1953, the Immigration and Naturalization Service (INS) tried to use LaRocca's criminal record to deport him, but several prominent figures testified on his behalf and he was able to remain in the country until his death in 1984.

As boss of Pittsburgh, LaRocca attended the 1957 Apalachin meeting with his caporegimes Gabriel "Kelly" Mannarino and Michael James Genovese. When police raided the meeting, LaRocca was able to escape while Mannarino and Genovese were arrested. LaRocca and Mannarino later became partners with Tampa crime family boss Santo Trafficante Jr. in the Sans Souci casino resort in Havana, Cuba. However, all mobsters were expelled from the country following the Cuban Revolution in 1959.

Through bribery, LaRocca was able to control politicians, police officers and other officials in the Pittsburgh area. His family also maintained control of labor unions through Local 1058. LaRocca's influence also grew through close ties to Gambino family boss Carlo Gambino, Bufalino family boss Russell Bufalino, Philadelphia family boss Angelo Bruno and Kansas City family boss Nick Civella. In the 1960s, LaRocca's family engaged in conflict with the Cleveland crime family when they expanded into Youngstown, Ohio. LaRocca supported Frank Valenti's takeover of the Rochester crime family from Jake Russo in 1964.

In the early 1980s, the family consisted of LaRocca, underboss Joseph Pecora, consigliere Michael Genovese and caporegimes John Bazzano Jr., Antonio Ripepi and Joseph Regino. LaRocca died on December 3, 1984.

=== Genovese and Porter ===
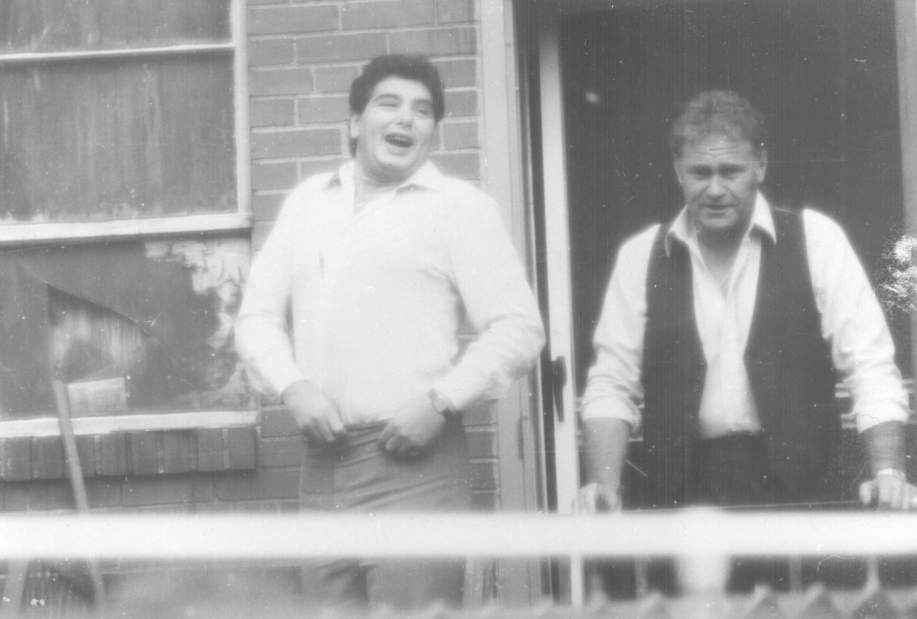
FBI surveillance photograph of the Pittsburgh Mafia members Eugene "Nick the Blade" Gesuale (left) and Charles "Chucky" Porter (right) leaving the Beacon Club in Squirrel Hill in 1981

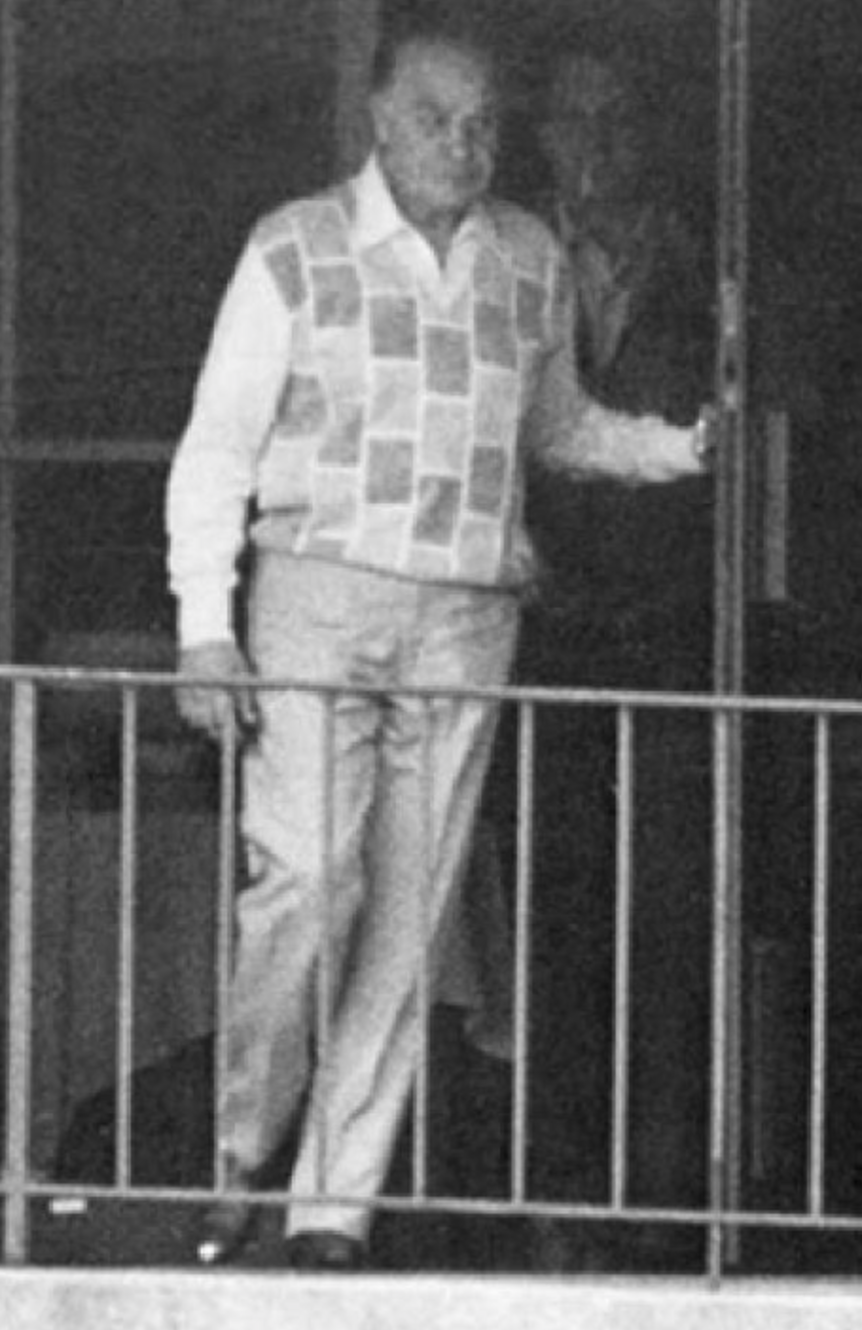
FBI surveillance photo of Michael Genovese exiting the Holiday House in 1984

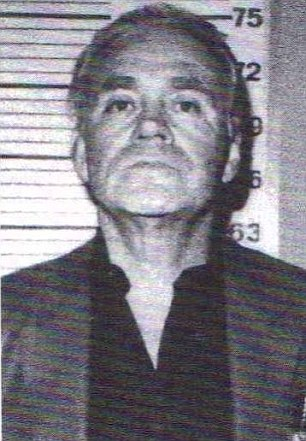
FBI mugshot of Chucky Porter in 1990

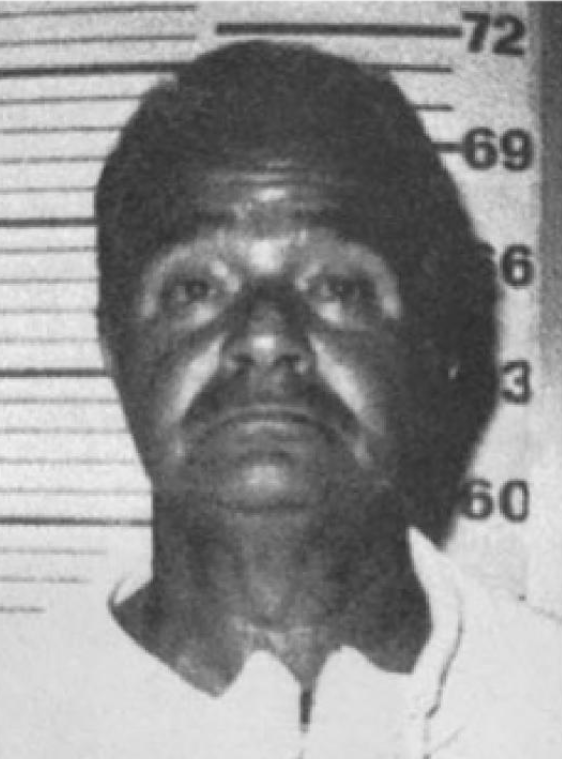
FBI mugshot of Louis Raucci in 1990

Michael Genovese succeeded LaRocca as boss of the Pittsburgh family in 1984. Genovese had started his criminal career by controlling the numbers racket in East Liberty and eventually became a capo operating from Gibsonia. Genovese had spent years closely working with LaRocca, Mannarino and Pecora. His reputation and power had increased over the years, allowing him to be successfully accepted as the new boss. Genovese pursued members of the Pittsburgh family to create a large illegal drug trafficking network. The drug trafficking activities led to increased law enforcement surveillance and investigations. In 1986, longtime family associate Charles "Chucky" Porter was inducted into the Pittsburgh family, becoming a made man even though Porter was only half Italian, from his mother's side, while his father was Irish-Italian. On March 3, 1987, longtime underboss and West Virginia gambling leader Joseph N. "Jo Jo" Pecora died. After Pecora's death, Genovese promoted Porter as underboss. According to a 1989 report by the Pennsylvania Crime Commission, the family had fallen into decline because the family was not accepting new members while the leadership was continuing to grow older.

In the late 1980s, the FBI increased its investigation into Pittsburgh's top cocaine traffickers, Porter and Louis Raucci, Sr. In March 1990, an indictment charged Porter and Raucci, along with seven associates, on charges of drug distribution, extortion, conspiracy to commit murder, robbery, illegal gambling and racketeering. The Crime Commission considered Porter to be Genovese's "right-hand man," while Raucci was said to "sit on the left side" of the boss. Both Porter and Raucci were convicted.

Porter decided to turn state's witness, leading to the conviction of many top members and associates of the Pittsburgh family. By 1992, there were only a few members and associates operating in Western Pennsylvania and Eastern Ohio. Raucci died in prison in 1996. Porter was released from prison in 2000 after his 28-year sentence was halved for helping the FBI investigate mob operations from New York, New Jersey, Florida and California, including narcotics operations in Pittsburgh. On October 31, 2006, Genovese died after of years of fighting with bladder cancer and heart disease. John Bazzano Jr. took over as boss until his death on July 28, 2008.

The Commission barred the Pittsburgh family from inducting new made members because many associates had been cooperating and working with the government.

=== Ciancutti and the current status ===
In 2008, Thomas "Sonny" Ciancutti became boss of the Pittsburgh family. Ciancutti himself was one of the few remaining made members operating in Pittsburgh after the late 1990s, when many members were imprisoned and older members started to pass away. According to the FBI, Ciancutti controlled a large illegal gambling ring with top bookmakers Robert Iannelli, John "Duffy" Conley, Jeff Risha and Ronnie "Porky" Melocchi, whom all paid him protection.

On September 5, 2013, "Operation Pork Chop" culminated with the charging of Melocchi and others with bookmaking and illegal gambling. In 2013, retired FBI special agent Roger Greenbank spoke about the Pittsburgh family and said, "There's no real structure anymore. There's no real family." In 2016, Ciancutti's most trusted associate, Jeff Risha, died of cancer. Ciancutti maintained a low profile, using associates to run Pittsburgh's local bookmaking and illegal gambling operations. In 2019, Iannelli, a longtime Pittsburgh bookmaker, was arrested along with his son and others.

On July 26, 2016, a gambling investigation at the Spartaco Sporting Club resulted in five of the club's officers and four employees being arrested during a raid by the Pennsylvania State Police's Bureau of Liquor Control Enforcement. A total of nineteen illegal video gambling devices, along with computer motherboards for the devices, money and various documents were seized. Ciancutti was a member of the club during this time.

On December 28, 2019, former Pittsburgh family associate Samuel Rende, aged 90, was shot in the head and killed while in a pickup truck near Calvary Cemetery in Greenfield. The police arrested and charged Anthony Miller with the homicide and robbery of Rende.

On July 8, 2021, Pittsburgh family boss Thomas "Sonny" Ciancutti died. Ciancutti was the last known made member in the Pittsburgh family.

== Historical leadership ==
=== Boss (official and acting) ===
- c.1888–1914 – Salvatore "Banana King" Catanzaro – stepped down, died on February 17, 1916
- c.1915–1919 – Gregorio Conti – murdered on September 24, 1919
- 1919–1925 – Salvatore Calderone – retired
- 1925–1929 – Stefano Monastero – murdered on August 6, 1929
- 1929–1931 – Giuseppe "Yeast Baron" Siragusa – murdered on September 13, 1931
- 1931–1932 – John Bazzano – found dead on August 8, 1932, in Red Hook, Brooklyn
- 1932–1937 – Vincenzo Capizzi – retired to Italy
- 1937–1956 – Frank Amato – stepped down, becoming underboss
- 1956–1984 – John Sebastian "Big John" LaRocca – died on December 3, 1984
  - Ruling Panel 1973–1978 – Michael Genovese, Gabriel Mannarino and Antonio Ripepi
  - Ruling Panel 1978–1980 – Michael Genovese, Gabriel Mannarino (died July 11, 1980) and Joseph Pecora (imprisoned 1979)
  - Acting 1980–1984 – Michael Genovese – promoted to boss
- 1984–2006 – Michael James Genovese – died on October 31, 2006
- 2006–2008 – John Bazzano Jr. – died on July 28, 2008
- 2008–2021 – Thomas "Sonny" Ciancutti – died on July 8, 2021

=== Underboss ===
- c.1915–1919 – Peppino Cusumano – nephew to boss Gregorio Conti
- 1925–1929 – Salvatore "Sam" Monastero – brother to boss Stefano Monastero
- 1937–1956 – Sebastian "Big John" LaRocca – became boss
- 1956–1962 – Frank Amato – became consigliere, died 1973
- 1962–1969 – Gabriel "Kelly" Mannarino – stepped down after indictment; died July 11, 1980
- 1969–1979 – Louis Volpe – stepped down, became capo
- 1983–1987 – Joseph N. "Jo Jo" Pecora – imprisoned 1979–1983, died 1987
- 1987–1990 – Charles "Chucky" Porter – arrested April 1990; convicted in 1990, sentenced to 28 years, defected to the government
- 1990–2006 – John Bazzano Jr. – became boss in 2006
- 2006–2008 – Thomas "Sonny" Ciancutti – became boss

=== Consigliere ===
- 1931–1937 – Nicola Gentile
- 1962–1973 – Frank Amato – died 1973
- 1973–1980 – Charles "Murgie" Imburgia – stepped down
- 1980–1984 – Michael James Genovese – promoted to boss
- 1984–2002 – Charles "Murgie" Imburgia – died
- 2002–2006 – Thomas "Sonny" Ciancutti – became underboss

== Current members ==
The last known made member was boss Thomas "Sonny" Ciancutti, who died on July 8, 2021.

=== Associates ===
==== Southwestern gambling ring ====
- Rodney Elia "Rusty" Iannelli – the son of former high ranking associate Robert Iannelli. Rodney was arrested in 1991 on illegal gambling from Chub's Place. He was charged in the 2013, with illegal gambling along with Pittsburgh mob figures Ron "Porky" Melocchi and Jeff "Biscuit" Risha. In 2019, Iannelli was arrested and charged along with his father Robert Iannelli and twelve others with operating an illegal gambling operation. In September 2020, Iannelli and his father pleaded guilty and were sentenced to 10 years in prison but were given probation and will not have to spend time in prison.
- John James Harkins
- Levi Wilson Helsel
- Victor Marchitello
- James Roger Martorella
- Arden Keith Metcalfe
- Floyd A. Panella
- Frank Joseph Pasquino
- Vincent M. Rapneth
- Harry Ronald Stetson

==== McKeesport gambling ring ====
- Ronald "Porky" Melocchi – is an associate of the Pittsburgh family and leader of the "McKeesport gambling ring". In 2013, Melocchi was indicted along with Jeffery Risha, Rodney Iannelli and fourteen others on illegal gambling charges. Melocchi was accused of run the illegal gambling operation from his defunct business the Coffee Pot in McKeesport. The indictment also charged Melocchi with selling illegal gambling machines and with controlling illegal gambling activity of lotteries and bookmaking throughout Monongahela Valley and McKeesport area. In the indictment Melocchi was accused of and boasted that he had law enforcement and local city council members in his pocket. The indictment alleged that Melocchi bought "Back Alley Vending", a Glassport business from Primo Mollica, a Pittsburgh Mafia associate who controlled illegal gambling in Mon Valley until he died in 2001. In June 2015, Melocchi was sentenced to a decade of probation.
- Kirk "K-Prime" Mollica – the son of former "high ranking" associate Primo Mollica, who once controlled gambling throughout Glassport, McKeesport, and the surrounding areas. Before his father Primo Mollica died in 2001, he had sold his "Back Alley Vending", a Glassport vending business to Ronald Melocchi. In 2013, Mollica was indicted along with Ronald Melocchi, Rodney Iannelli, Jeffrey Risha and fourteen others on illegal gambling charges. The indictment list Kirk's "M&M Coffee Shop" in Glassport associated with Melocchi's "Back Alley Vending".
- Robert H. Bogesdorfer
- James Cerqua
- Mark Holtzman
- Eugene T. Kowalski
- Timothy John Minkus
- Arthur Pero
- Ronald Preset

==== Fayette and Allegheny gambling ring ====
- Ralph "Big Head" Maselli – is an associate of Pittsburgh family. In October 2000, Maselli along with Pittsburgh made member Thomas Ciancutti, associate Jeffery Risha, his wife Karen Maselli and ten other associates were charged with illegal gambling in Fayette County. It was revealed in court that Maselli and Jeffery Risha were Thomas Ciancutti's top lieutenants who operated from Pittsburgh before moving into the "New Beacon Club" in Bloomfield. The courts described Maselli as Ciancutti's lieutenant controlling sports betting and numbers rackets throughout Allegheny County and also was involved in the placement of video poker machines.
- Dave Borkovich
- Mark Borkovich
- Louis Cutone Jr.
- Thomas Ferris
- Mark Anthony Howard
- James Michael John
- Joseph Scarillo
- Albert Tabasco
- Thomas Thornton

==== Duffy gambling ring ====
- John Francis "Duffy" Conley Jr. – a Pittsburgh family associate who operates an illegal video poker machine ring in Pittsburgh area. Conley owned two vending machine companies "Three River Coin Co." and "Duffy Vending" and controlled illegal gambling Allegheny County. Conley was associated with both Pittsburgh family associates Ralph Maselli and John Adams. In 2006, Conley was arrested for running illegal gambling operations. The federal investigation never proved that Conley paid the Pittsburgh mob for protection, but the Pennsylvania Crime Commission claimed Conley received video poker machines from a company aligned with New Jersey's Lucchese and DeCavalcante organized crime families. In November 2006, Conley and Chris Hankish were charged in a gambling ring. Conley was released from prison in July 2009. In 2010, Conley and William Curtin opened a legal online gambling website. In May 2025, Conley was indicted for overseeing around 400 illegal video-poker machines in the Pittsburgh area, that were spaced across 150 restaurants, bars, and convenience stores in the area.
- William Curtin – is Conley's number two man in the gambling ring. In 2010, Curtin and John Conley opened a legal online gambling website.
- Michael "Mickey" Flynn Jr. – an associate of Conley's. He pleaded guilty November 1, 2006, to gambling conspiracy charges in connection with Conley's illegal gambling operation. Flynn is the owner of the Union Grill in Washington, and was convicted on state gambling charges in 2004.

==== Penn Hills gambling machine ring ====
- Mauro P. Matone – a Pittsburgh associate. Matone worked closely with Eugene Gesuale and involved in the narcotics distribution. He was released from prison on February 22, 1996. In March 2003, Matone was arrested along with thirteen others for operating illegal video gambling machines in Penn Hills.
- Joseph P. Scolieri Sr. – a Pittsburgh associate involved in sports gambling and bookmaking in the Penn Hills area.

==== Unis crew and the Beaver County gambling ring ====
- Shane Hennen – a Pittsburgh native now living in Las Vegas. Hennen has connections to many gambling networks from Pittsburgh region that were allied with the LaRocca crime family. In March 2025, Hennen was arrested for his involvement in a large-scale points shaving scheme involving NBA as well as college players.

==== Other associates ====
- John V. "Johnny A" Adams Jr. – a Pittsburgh associate. Adams controls a large gambling operation in the Pittsburgh area and is a close associate of John Conley Jr. and Ralph Maselli.
- Alfred F. Corbo – a Pittsburgh associate overseeing large scale gambling operations in Wheeling, West Virginia and Altoona, Pennsylvania.
- Reginald "Nico" Demelio – a Pittsburgh associate involved in bid rigging and extortion.
- Joseph LaQuatra – a Pittsburgh associate.
- James "Brad" LaRocca – a Pittsburgh associate involved in bid rigging.
- Anthony Murgie – a Pittsburgh associate. He is the nephew of Charles Imburgia and was a close associate of Charles Porter and Michael Genovese. Murgie was involved in illegal gambling.
- Gerald Pecora Jr. – a Pittsburgh associate and former Local 1058 Union president.
- Felix "Phil" Pitzerell– a Pittsburgh associate involved in gambling, narcotics and stolen goods.
- Frank Rosa – a Pittsburgh associate.
- Gerald D. Sabatini – a Pittsburgh associate. Sabatini's brothers John V. and Robert J. were associates of the Pittsburgh family and involved in narcotics and illegal gambling operations. Sabatini's is a close associate of Thomas Ciancutti.
- Jon Edward Scalzitti – a Pittsburgh associate. In 2002, Scalzitti was found guilty of a drug distribution network from Florida to Pittsburgh.
- Salvatore A. "Sonny" Williams – a Pittsburgh associate. His father controlled a large Pittsburgh gambling ring. Williams is a close associate of John Conley Jr. Williams was also a close associate of Paul Hankish.

== Former members ==
- Frank Amato – former boss. Amato controlled rackets in New Kensington and West Virginia he expanded the crime family's territory throughout Braddock, Pennsylvania and Allegheny County. He stepped down as boss becoming underboss to LaRocca. He died in 1973.
- Frank "Sonny" Amato Jr. – a former soldier who operated in East Pittsburgh, Braddock, Turtle Creek and North Versailles.
- John Bazzano Jr. – former boss. Bazzano's father John, Sr. was boss of the Pittsburgh family before being murdered in 1932. During the 1950s, he joined his father-in-law Antonio Ripepi's crew operating gambling rackets in the Monongahela Valley. Bazzano was released from prison in 1981 and was promoted to capo controlling Kelly Mannarino's old crew. Bazzano operated from McMurray, Pennsylvania. He later became underboss to Genovese and became boss in 2006. On July 28, 2008, Bazzano, Jr. died.
- Anthony "Wango" Capizzi – former soldier who operated in Las Vegas with the Bufalino family. He died in 2007.
- Geno "Eugene" Chiarelli – former soldier. He was released from prison in 2008. Chiarelli died on June 14, 2012.
- Thomas "Sonny" Ciancutti – former boss. Ciancutti took over Gabriel "Kelly" Mannarino's New Kensington gambling rackets. In October 2000, Ciancutti along with his wife Sylvia Thorpe Ciancutti, his two close associates Jeffrey Risha and Ralph Maselli and eleven other associates were arrested and charged with running a gambling network that spanned Westmoreland, Allegheny and Fayette counties. Ciancutti's two lieutenants in the operation were Jeffrey Risha, who controlled sport betting and numbers rackets in Fayette County, Ralph Maselli who ran the Allegheny County gambling operations and also was involved in the placement of video poker machines. In 2002, Ciancutti was given probation for controlling gambling operations in Allegheny and Fayette counties. On July 8, 2021, Ciancutti died.
- Pasquale "Pat" Ferruccio – a former capo who operated in Canton-Stark County, Ohio area and the Akron-Summit County, Ohio area while paying tribute to the Cleveland family. In 1991, Ferruccio was imprisoned. He died in 2006.
- Michael James Genovese – a former boss. Under Genovese's leadership the crime family became involved drug distribution in the Midwest and Northeast. His crime family also took control over rackets in Ohio after the Cleveland crime family members were imprisoned. Genovese also had members attempt to infiltrate an Indian casino near San Diego. His crime family also tried to take control of the McKees Rocks gambling rackets. After the defection of his underboss Charles Porter and capo Lenny Strollo in the 1990s, the Pittsburgh family declined in power. Genovese stayed boss until his death in 2006, at the age of 87.
- Charles "Murgie" Imburgia– former consigliere. Imburgia began his criminal career in Pittsburgh before moving to Ohio and controlling Trumbull County. His nephew Anthony Murgie became an associate to the Pittsburgh family. Imburgia's son-in-law Frank Nannicola continued to operate a gambling-equipment business based in Youngstown, Ohio.
- Sebastian "Big John" LaRocca – a former boss. Under LaRocca's leadership the crime family became a powerful force in Pittsburgh's labor unions. He established rackets in Ohio, while sharing some of the illegal income with the Cleveland crime family. LaRocca also formed an agreement with Tampa crime family boss Santo Trafficante operating casinos in Havana, Cuba. In 1957, LaRocca attended the Apalachin conference with Michael James Genovese and Gabriel "Kelly" Mannarino. He died on December 3, 1984.
- Gabriel "Kelly" Mannarino – former capo who controlled the New Kensington rackets. Mannarino had ties to the Bufalino family. In 1969, he was indicted along with boss Sebastian John LaRocca for conspiring on a loan kickback scheme from the teamsters Central States Pension Fund, but they were both latter acquitted. Mannarino controlled Westmoreland County and Youngstown, Ohio, which were later inherited by Thomas Ciancutti and Joseph Naples. He died on July 11, 1980, from cancer.
- Sam Mannarino – former made member and brother to Gabriel "Kelly" Mannarino. He helped his brother control gambling activities in New Kensington and the northern part of Westmoreland County. In 1958, Mannarino was forced into retirement because of law enforcement surveillance and declining health. During the 1960s, Mannarino informal chats with the FBI and admitted to the FBI that he was a member of "La Cosa Nostra" and that Pittsburgh crime family boss John LaRocca had sponsored him and his brother into the organization. Mannarino never testified against any of his former criminal associates, and he never revealed anything that would put him in the category of a full-fledged informant. In June 1967, Mannarino died.
- Santino Joseph "Sandy" Naples — former soldier. Naples served a ten-year prison sentence at Western Penitentiary after being convicted for his role in an armed robbery in the early 1930s. He was allegedly inducted into the Pittsburgh Mafia after befriending several "made men" while in prison and appointed head of the crime family's Youngstown faction during the 1950s. In 1958, Naples was convicted of conducting an illegal lottery and incarcerated at Mahoning County Jail. In 1960, the Cleveland crime family went to war with the Pittsburgh Mafia over control of gambling territory in the Mahoning Valley. When Naples refused the Cleveland Mafia's demands for tribute, he was ordered killed. On March 11, 1960, while 52-year-old Naples was on furlough from prison, he and his 28-year-old girlfriend Mary Ann Vracich were shot dead by two gunmen armed with a 12-gauge shotgun and a 45-caliber machine gun on the porch of Vracich's house on Caledonia Street on the South Side of Youngstown. The shooters were allegedly Charles Cavallaro and Vincent DeNiro of the Cleveland faction. Naples was succeeded by his brother William Naples as head of the Pittsburgh faction's Youngstown rackets.
- Joseph N. "Jo Jo" Pecora – a former underboss who controlled gambling rackets from Chester and throughout West Virginia. In 1979, Pecora as convicted of racketeering and illegal gambling and was sentenced to five years in prison. On March 3, 1987, Pecora died of heart disease in Florida.
- Louis Raucci Sr. – a former soldier, he took over Joseph Sica's Penn Hills rackets. In 1990 he was imprisoned, and he died in 1995.
- Antonio Ripepi – a former capo who controlled Monongahela Valley gambling, with his son-in-law John Bazzano, Jr.; he died in 2000.
- Joseph Sica – a former soldier who controlled rackets in Penn Hills. In 1978, Sica was convicted of extortion. He retired in the 1980s and died in 1991.
- Frank Valenti – a former soldier; in the early 1960s he took over the Rochester family.
- John "Jack" Verilla – controlled several gambling operations with ties to the LaRocca family. He died in prison while serving a life sentence for murder.
- Henry A. "Zebo" Zottola – a former soldier who worked with Charles Porter controlling loansharking and gambling in Eastern Allegheny County. During the 1970s Zottola worked with underboss Joseph Pecora controlling his gambling and illegal rackets when Percora was imprisoned. Zottola controlled Pittsburgh's family interest in Youngstown, Ohio. He died in 1998.

== Former associates ==
- Robert "Bobby I" Iannelli — was an associate to the Pittsburgh family and the leader of the "Southwestern gambling ring" who controlled illegal sports gambling and numbers lottery in Allegheny and Westmoreland counties from his Chub's Place restaurant in North Park. Iannelli started his criminal career under Tony Grosso a Pittsburgh gambling boss. Iannelli was fined by Pittsburgh police in 1959, with football pool sheets. After Grosso was imprisoned, Iannelli took over the illegal gambling in Western Pennsylvania on behalf of the LaRocca crime family and Mafia don Michael Genovese. Iannelli partnered with the Williams brother and controlled Grosso's illegal lottery, and also aligned with Pittsburgh capos Anthony "Wango" Capizzi and Frank "Sonny" Amato, Jr. His son Rodney "Rusty" Iannelli joined him in the criminal gambling rackets. In 2019, Iannelli was arrested and charged along with his son Rodney Iannelli and twelve others with operating an illegal gambling operation. In September 2020, Iannelli and his son pleaded guilty, they paid fines of $300,000 and sentenced to 10 years in prison but were given probation and will not have to spend time in prison. Iannelli died on July 15, 2025, aged 95.
- Eugene "Nick the Blade" Gesuale — During the 1970s and mid-1980s, Gesuale was a narcotics trafficker and enforcer for Charles Porter and Penn Hills capo Louie Raucci. Gesuale became the Pittsburgh Mafia's liaison between the crime family and Pagan's Motorcycle Club boss Daniel "Danny the Deacon" Zwibel. He ran his marijuana and cocaine distribution network from East Liberty and Highland Park along with the Pittsburgh family and the Pagans biker gang. Gesuale also was involved in bookmaking, loan sharking, extortion and ran a prostitution business in Manhattan's “Little Italy” section, with the apparent approval of New York City mob families. He was also a close mob associate of Pittsburgh family boss Michael Genovese. Gesuale became famously known from the movie Goodfellas and he was nicknamed the "Pittsburgh connection" after selling cocaine to Lucchese family associates Henry Hill, Tommy DeSimone and Jimmy Burke. In 1985, an indictment charged Gesuale, his right hand, John "Johnny Three Fingers" Leone, and Pagan boss Daniel Zwibel with drug trafficking. He was released from prison on October 31, 2014 after serving 28 years related to drug trafficking Gesuale died from a heart attack at an Ormond Beach, Florida bar, aged 73, on July 29, 2016.
- Anthony "Ninny the Torch" Lagattuta — former mob enforcer, reputed hit man and arsonist.
- Anthony P. "Rocky" LaRocca Jr. — a former Pittsburgh family associate and member of the Pagan's Motorcycle Club. LaRocca was the nephew to former Pittsburgh boss John LaRocca and head of the Pagans in Westmoreland County. He was charged with trafficking in machine guns in 1969, but the case was dismissed. In 1973, LaRocca and two other Pagan members pistol-whipped two ATF agents who were investigating the gang in the parking lot of a North Huntingdon hotel. LaRocca and another member of the Pagans were charged with assaulting a federal agent, conspiracy to distribute a controlled substance, possession of a non-registered silencer, and using a firearm during the commission of a felony. He was sentenced to three years in prison and released after serving half the term. In 1975, LaRocca was sentenced to 30 years in prison following a shootout with federal agents posing as drug-buyers at the Miracle Mile Shopping Center in Monroeville. After an appeal, his sentence was reduced to 10 years in prison. After he was paroled from prison in April 1982, LaRocca created a cocaine distribution network operating in Western Pennsylvania with Francis "Rick" Ferri and others. In August 1982, LaRocca and Ferri shot and killed John "Jocko" Heatherington, a member of their drug ring who had been offered a plea bargain by federal authorities in exchange for informing on his associates, outside a North Versailles motel. In 1987, LaRocca and Ferri were found guilty and both sentenced to life in prison for the murder of Heatherington. LaRocca was also charged with cocaine trafficking and received an additional sentenced to 20 years in prison. While in prison LaRocca continued to control his cocaine distribution network. He died from lung cancer, aged 57, while imprisoned at the State Correctional Institution in Pittsburgh on October 13, 1997.
- John V. "Johnny Three Fingers" Leone — a Pittsburgh associate who was involved in narcotics trafficking. Leone was Eugene Gesuale's top lieutenant and a major player in the "Pittsburgh Connection", a drug trafficking operation conducted along with Pagans motorcycle gang boss Daniel Zwibel. Leone died January 2, 2002.
- Primo Victor Mollica — a former "high ranking" associate who once controlled gambling throughout Glassport, McKeesport, and the surrounding areas. On February 19, 1981, Mollica was charged by Pennsylvania authorities with operation of a lottery, bookmaking, and conspiracy. In July 1983, Mollica was arrested and charged along with Augustine Ferrone, Andrew Kurta, Sidney Mendlowitz, Robert Weitz and Donna Stagno with running a multimillion-dollar bookmaking ring out of Caesars Boardwalk Regency Hotel-Casino in Atlantic City, New Jersey. Mollica died on September 19, 2001.
- Jeffrey "The Biscuit" Risha — was an associate of Pittsburgh family. Risha was considered Thomas Ciancutti's top lieutenant and who controlled sports betting and video poker gambling. In October 2000, Risha along with Pittsburgh made member Thomas Ciancutti, associate Ralph Maselli and eleven other associates were charged with illegal gambling in Fayette County. It was revealed in court that Risha and Ralph Maselli were Ciancutti's top lieutenants who operated from Pittsburgh before moving into the "New Beacon Club" in Bloomfield. The courts described Risha as Ciancutti's top lieutenant controlling sports betting and numbers rackets throughout Fayette County and was responsible for ensuring the betting was profitable. In 2013, Risha was charged with Ronald Melocchi, Rodney Iannelli and others for illegal gambling. Risha died in 2016.
- Frank P. Unis Jr. (March 16, 1954 – May 15, 2020) — a former Pittsburgh associate who controlled illegal gambling in Aliquippa. He operates a large illegal gambling in Beaver County and was a close associate of Paul Hankish. In 1989, Unis Jr., was identified as the leader of an Aliquippa-based gambling operation. In September 1991, Unis Jr., pleaded guilty to illegal gambling charges in West Virginia, he and was later sentenced to 18 months in prison and three years of probation. In 1993, Unis Jr., received a 16-year probation sentence after pleading guilty in Beaver County Court to an illegal gambling charge. On October 21, 2008, Unis Jr. and Duane Cope were charged with attempted homicide of a man in front of a gambling spot in Aliquippa. According to the Aliquippa police, Unis Jr. admitted too running an illegal gambling operation from 435 Franklin Ave. in Aliquippa. The police discovered the gambling location after Thomas “Snooky” Jeter Jr. was shot and he told the police that Unis Jr. was the shooter. Unis was a Pittsburgh associate with ties to the Gambino family in New York. Unis was charged by federal authorities with running a $500,000 per week bookmaking operation. On May 15, 2020, Unis died in his home.
- Adolpho "Junior" Williams — a former associate involved in bookmaking, loan sharking and narcotics distribution. Michael James Genovese provided Williams muscle for the crew's collections and enforcement wing in Robert (Bobby I) Iannelli and Paul (Paulie No Legs) Hankish, a Pittsburgh mob gambling chief stationed in West Virginia. Williams was on A&E's reality TV show Godfather of Pittsburgh. He held mafia control of McKees Rocks from the mid-1980s to early 2000s. Williams' territory spanned from the East End to the Hill District and McKees Rocks. On March 11, 2003, Williams pleaded guilty to a $2.5 million gambling operation. He died March 30, 2016
- Manuel "Mike The Greek" Xenakis — former associate of the Pittsburgh family and a prominent bookie who worked under Thomas "Sonny" Ciancutti. He served 18 months in prison for running a numbers scheme. Xenakis died on June 3, 2023.

== Factions and territories ==
=== Youngstown faction ===
The Pittsburgh family used associates to control the illegal gambling and loansharking operations in Youngstown, Ohio and throughout the Mahoning Valley. During the early 1970s the faction gained control of the gambling rackets in Youngstown and shared some of the profits with the Cleveland crime family. The Youngstown faction also maintained an alliance with the Youngstown chapter of the Outlaws Motorcycle Club.

- 1930s–1960s — Paul Romeo — born 1894 in Calabria and entered the American in 1913. Romeo controlled an independent Calabrian organization but maintained ties to the Calabrian factions in Cleveland and Pittsburgh. He retired in the 1960s and died in 1976.
- 1960s–1980s — Dominic "Big Dom" Mallamo — born 1904 in Calabria and arrived in Youngstown in 1918. He succeeded Romeo as leader of the independent Calabrian organization in Youngstown, Ohio. Mallamo maintained close ties with the Pittsburgh family though his nephew James Prato, a made member of the Pittsburgh family. He died in 1987.
- 1980s–1988 — Vincenzo Nicola "Brier Hill Jimmy" Prato — born February 10, 1907, and moved to Cleveland in January 1930, he later moved to Youngstown. Prato was also known "James" or "Two-Gun Jimmy". His uncle was Calabrian mobster Dominic Mallamo. Prato became a made member of the Pittsburgh family and took control of the Calabrian organization, which became known as the Pittsburgh family's Youngstown faction. He died in 1988.
- 1988–1991 — Joseph "Joey" Naples — protégé of Prato, he was murdered August 19, 1991
- 1991–1999 — Lenine "Lenny" Strollo — nephew of Prato, imprisoned and defected to the government in 1999.

=== Wheeling faction ===
The Pittsburgh family used associates to control the illegal gambling and loansharking operations in Wheeling, West Virginia and the surrounding areas.

- c. 1930–1970 — William G. “Big Bill” Lias — born on July 14, 1900. After Prohibition ended Lias moved into illegal gambling and controlled casino-nightclubs in Wheeling. In 1945, Lias purchase Wheeling Down racetrack. In 1964, Lias rivaled with Paul Hankish and was suspected of ordering the car bombing of Hankish. The U.S. government tried to deport Lias to Greece but they failed to prove he was born outside of the United States. Lias died in 1970.
- 1970–1988 — Paul "No Legs" Hankish — a Pittsburgh family associate of Gabriel "Kelly" Mannarino, Michael Genovese, Charles Porter and Joseph Naples. On January 17, 1964, Hankish was a victim of a car bombing which resulted in the partial amputation of both his legs. It was suspected the car bombing was a result of Hankish trying to expand his gambling territory into William Lias territory. After William Lias died in 1970, Hankish took over Wheeling criminal operations with the support of the Pittsburgh family. Hankish was involved in diverse criminal activities, including gambling, prostitution, narcotics trafficking, extortion, fencing stolen goods, and loansharking. In July 1990, Hankish was sentenced to 33 years in prison.
- 1988–2008 — Christopher Paul Hankish — a Pittsburgh family associate operating from Wheeling, West Virginia. His father Paul Hankish was a powerful mobster. In 1990, Hankish was a codefendant along with Charles Porter and Louis F. Raucci Sr. Hankish pleaded guilty in 1991 to cocaine distribution and was sentenced to two years in federal prison. In November 2006, Hankish was charged along with his close associate John Conley Jr. on illegal gambling. Hankish died on September 19, 2008.

== Government informants and witnesses ==
- Bobby Mancini — cooperated with Pennsylvania State Police in a probe into Adolpho "Junior" Williams' mob crew and political and police corruption. Mancini was killed on October 24, 1988, shot in the back of the head at his dining room table.
- Charles "Chucky" Porter — former underboss who became the highest-ranking member in the Pittsburgh family to cooperate with the government. He became a soldier in 1986. Porter was the right-hand man of boss Michael Genovese. He was sentenced to 28 years in prison in 1990 on charges of drug distribution, loansharking, extortion, conspiracy to commit murder, robbery, illegal gambling and racketeering. Porter confessed to the infiltration of a Native American casino near San Diego and according to former FBI agent Roger Greenbank, Porter prevented six Mob-related murders through his cooperation. He was released from prison in 2000. Porter died on October 11, 2016, at the age of 82.
- Joseph "Joey" Rosa — was an associate of the LaRocca family, who later testified on behalf of the federal government and provided information that led to the largest organized crime prosecution in Western Pennsylvania's history.
- Lenine "Lenny" Strollo (April 21, 1931 – May 19, 2021) — former capo of the Youngstown, Ohio faction before becoming a government witness. He began his criminal career in Pittsburgh before moving to Youngstown, Ohio and associating with Pasquale Ferruccio and Joseph Naples. In 1988, Strollo was indicted for controlling an illegal gambling operation in Mahoning County. In 1990, he pled guilty to RICO charges and was sentenced to 14 months in prison and was fined $20,000. In August 1991, Joey Naples the capo of the Youngstown faction was killed and Strollo took over the crew. In December 1997, Strollo was indicted and charged with the murder of Ernie Biondillo and the attempted murder of Paul Gains. Strollo agreed to cooperate with federal prosecutors and in 1999, he testified against three men for murdering Ernie Biondillo and for attempting to murder Mahoning County Prosecutor-elect Paul Gains on Christmas Eve of 1996. All three men received life sentences without the possibility of parole. In 2004, Strollo pleaded guilty to racketeering and tax charges and was sentenced to thirteen (13) years in prison. He was released from prison in 2012. Strollo died on May 19, 2021, at the age of 90.

== Rivals ==
- Anthony "Tony" Grosso — controlled gambling operations in the Pittsburgh area. The FBI never categorized Grosso as an organized crime member. Grosso was linked to Charles "Chucky" Porter, and Grosso had ties to the Pittsburgh political system allowing him to run his organization unscathed for many years and unconnected to organized crime. He was eventually arrested by law enforcement and he served significant jail time, ultimately dying while incarcerated. His organization has no members left operating in the Pittsburgh area today. Grosso's antics were so legendary that Hollywood loosely based the movie Lucky Numbers starring John Travolta on them.

== List of murders committed by the Pittsburgh crime family ==
Name	Date	Reason
Giuseppe "Joe the Baron" Siragusa	September 13, 1931	49-year-old Pittsburgh Mafia boss Siragusa was killed by the Luciano crime family due to his allegiance to Salvatore Maranzano, boss of the Maranzano crime family in New York. He was shot five times in the head, chest and arm by three gunmen in the basement clubroom of his home in the Squirrel Hill neighborhood of Pittsburgh three days after Maranzano had been murdered.
Giovanni Volpe, Arthur Volpe & Jimmy Volpe	July 29, 1932	The three Volpe brother's were shot and killed inside of the Rome Coffee Shop located on 704 Wylie Avenue in Pittsburgh's Hill District. It is believed John Bazzano, the boss of the Pittsburgh family at the time, had orchestrated their murder.
John Bazzano	August 8, 1932	Bazzano had served as the boss of the Pittsburgh family during the time of his murder. It is believed Bazzano was murdered for the unsanctioned triple murder of Jimmy Volpe, Arthur Volpe and Giovanni Volpe, without the approval of the American Mafia commission. Bazzano was stabbed with an ice pick and strangled to death.
Vincent Innocenzi	August 6, 1960	Innocenzi had served as an associate of the Cleveland crime family. It is believed Innocenzi was murdered as retribution for the murder of Joseph "Stoney" Romano, an associate of the Pittsburgh crime family.
Mike Farah	June 10, 1961	Farah had served as an associate of the Cleveland family. Farah had managed the Jungle Inn, a Mafia operated casino and club. Farah was killed by two or three shotgun blasts at his home in Youngstown, Ohio.
James "Vinnie D" DeNiro	July 17, 1961	DeNiro was killed in a car bomb outside of a restaurant in Youngstown, Ohio, as part of the Cleveland-Pittsburgh Mafia war.
Billy Naples	July 1, 1962	Naples was a soldier for the Pittsburgh family, and the younger brother of Sammy Naples, whom was murdered in March 1960. Naples was killed in a car explosion at his home.
Charles "Cadillac Charlie" Cavallaro & Tommy Cavallaro	November 23, 1962	Cavallaro had served as a soldier for the Cleveland family. Cavallaro and his 11-year old son, Tommy Cavallaro, were murdered in a car bomb, as they were on their way to football practice.
Paul Calautti	October 11, 1968	Calautti was an associate of the Cleveland family, and his murder was ordered by Joseph "Little Joey" Naples.
Jimmy Goodnight	January 4, 1979	Goodnight had served as the 'Commissioner' of McKees Rocks, Pennsylvania. Goodnight was poisoned to death, as the whisky bottle he was drinking from was poisoned with cyanide. It is believed he was murdered for acquiring large gambling debts to the Pittsburgh family.
James "Peeps" Cononico	January 11, 1979	Cononico had served as the driver to Joseph Naples. Cononico was shot and killed as he returned to his halfway house.
Bobby Furey	April 12, 1979	Furey had once served as the driver for Joseph Naples, and it is believed his murder was ordered by Naples. Furey had worked for Naples jukebox and vending machine business. Furey was shot and killed as he was changing the tyre of his vehicle at his home.
Dominic "Junior" Senzarino	October 2, 1980	Senzarino possibly served as a captain to James Licavoli, the former boss of the Cleveland family, and a cousin to the Carabbia brothers. Senzarino was shot 3 times and killed by a shotgun blast at his home. Robert Dorler was later convicted for the Senzarino murder.
Charles "Charlie the Crab" Carabbia	December 13, 1980	Carabbia was a member of the Cleveland family, and was killed as part of the Mahoning Valley Mafia war between the Cleveland and Pittsburgh Mob families. Carabbia was last seen alive attending a meeting with Pittsburgh family family soldier, Lenny Strollo, who later became a captain before defecting to the government as a witness in the late 1990s.
Joe Bertone	June 17, 1985	Bertone was allegedly a racketeer and owned a restaurant. It is believed Bertone was killed at the age of 49, for with feuding Eugene "Geno" Chiarelli over money, a powerful figure in the Pittsburgh family, and that he had scammed a man out of a $100,000 cocaine deal.
Marty Fitzpatrick	July 1, 1987	Fitzpatrick was a retired police officer from the McKees Rocks Police Department at the time of his murder. According to an informant, Fitzpatrick was involved in a dispute with Gabriel "Kelly" Mannarino, who had once served as the underboss of the Pittsburgh family during the 1960s, and that Mannarino had left instructions to members of the Pittsburgh family to murder Fitzpatrick once he had left the police force. Fitzpatrick was beaten, strangled and then tied to the bumper of a car and dragged several blocks.
Bobby Mancini	October 1988	It is believed Mancini was shot to death inside of his apartment as it was confirmed that he was an informant. Mancini had potentially damaging information and was set to serve as the star witness against Dennis Skosnik, then-mayor of McKees Rocks in Pennsylvania, and later as the Chief Deputy Sheriff of Allegheny County, Pennsylvania, for bribery.
Joseph "Little Joey" Naples	August 19, 1991	Naples was shot and killed at the age of 58, by a sniper rifle bullet, while he was visiting a construction site where his new home would have been built. Naples was the protégé of Vincent "Briar Hill Jimmy" Prato, whom had served as the captain of the Youngstown crew in the 1980s. It is believed Naples was murdered as a result of a feud with Lenny Strollo, Strollo had asked the Gambino family from New York for permission to kill Naples which was approved.
Ernest "Ernie" Biondillo	June 3, 1996	It is believed Biondillo was murdered for refusing to pay tribute money to the Pittsburgh family, at the age of 53. Biondillo had previously served as a soldier under the Joseph Naples faction, whom was murdered in August 1991.

== See also ==
- Robert Duggan
- Eugene Coon

General:

- Crime in Pennsylvania
- List of Italian Mafia crime families

== Sources ==
=== Books ===
- Capeci, Jerry. The Complete Idiot's Guide to the Mafia. Indianapolis: Alpha Books, 2002. ISBN 0-02-864225-2
- Devico, Peter J. The Mafia Made Easy: The Anatomy and Culture of La Cosa Nostra.
- Porrello, Rick. To Kill the Irishman: The War That Crippled the Mafia. 2004
- Ciancuiit, Thomas Little Chicago: A History of Organized Crime in New Kensington, Pennsylvania - Book by Dennis L. Marsili
- Hodos, Paul N. “Steel City Mafia: Blood, Betrayal and Pittsburgh’s Last Don.” Arcadia Publishing. ISBN 9781467153751.

=== Reports ===
- Lewis Jr., Alvin B. (April 1981). 1980 Annual Report (PDF) (Report). Pennsylvania Crime Commission – via Government of Pennsylvania.
- Lewis Jr., Alvin B. (April 1982). 1981 Annual Report (PDF) (Report). Pennsylvania Crime Commission – via Government of Pennsylvania.
- Ohio OC Consulting Committee (1986). 1986 Report of the Organized Crime Consulting Committee (PDF) (Report). Attorney General of Ohio – via National Criminal Justice Reference Service.
- Reilly, Michael J. (April 25, 1989). 1989 Annual Report (PDF) (Report). Pennsylvania Crime Commission – via Government of Pennsylvania.
- Reilly, Michael J. (March 30, 1991). 1990 Annual Report – Organized Crime in Pennsylvania: A Decade of Change (PDF) (Report). Pennsylvania Crime Commission – via Government of Pennsylvania.
