= John LaRocca =

American mobster

- The Pittsburgh Press, January 1, 1953
- Born: May 1, 1901; Villarosa, Sicily
- Died: December 3, 1984 (aged 83); McCandless Township, Pennsylvania, U.S.

John Sebastian LaRocca (May 1, 1901 – December 3, 1984) was the Sicilian-born American boss of the Pittsburgh crime family from the 1950s until his death in 1984.

== Early life ==
Born in Villarosa, Sicily on May 1, 1901, LaRocca and his family immigrated to the United States in 1910, and settled in Indiana County, Pennsylvania. As a young man, LaRocca went to work in the coal mines. In 1922, at age 20, he was arrested for assaulting a young woman and sentenced to three years in state prison.

== Career ==
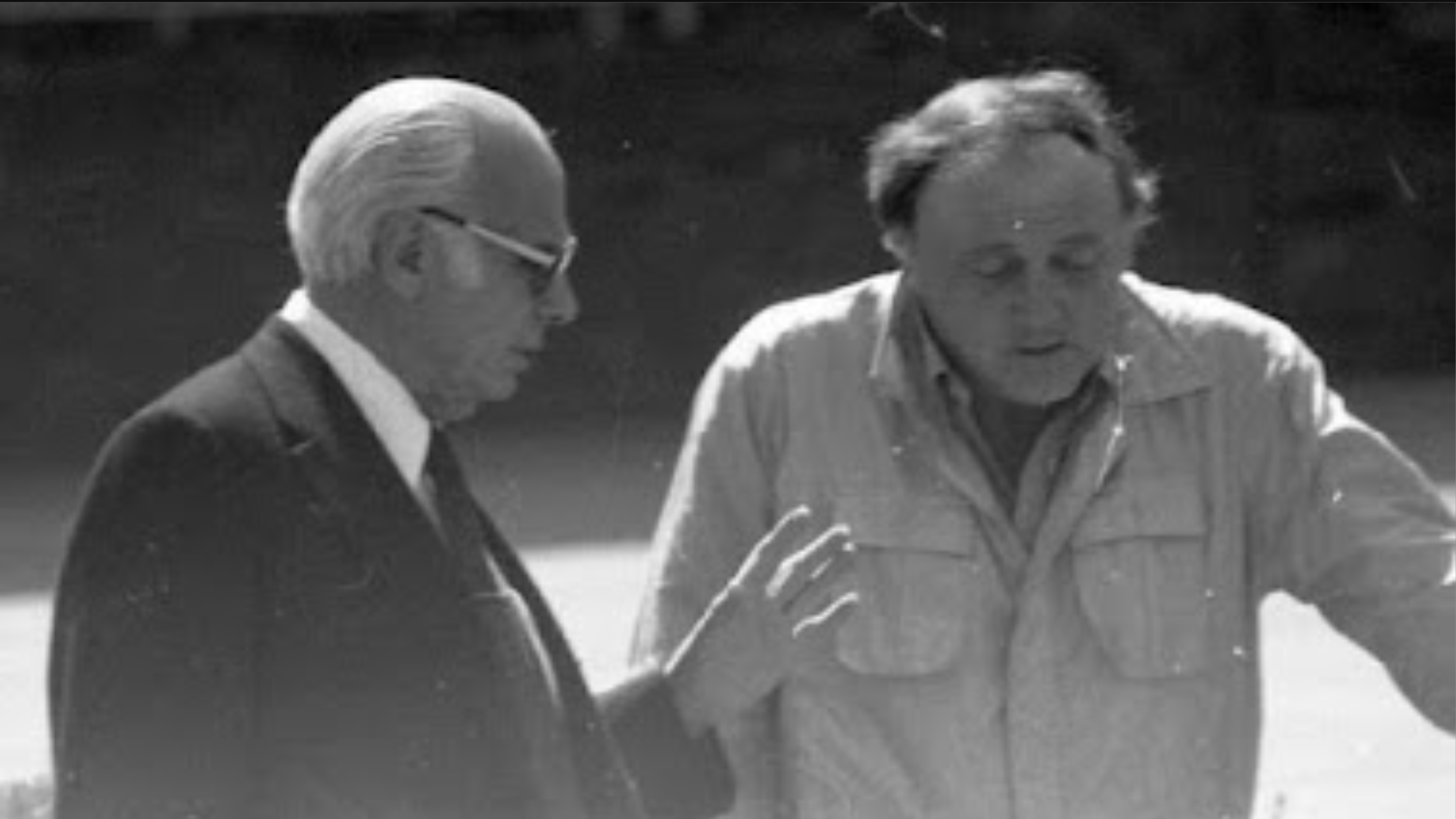
FBI surveillance photo of LaRocca (Left) and Thomas Ciancutti (Right) at Allegheny Car Wash on June 9, 1980.

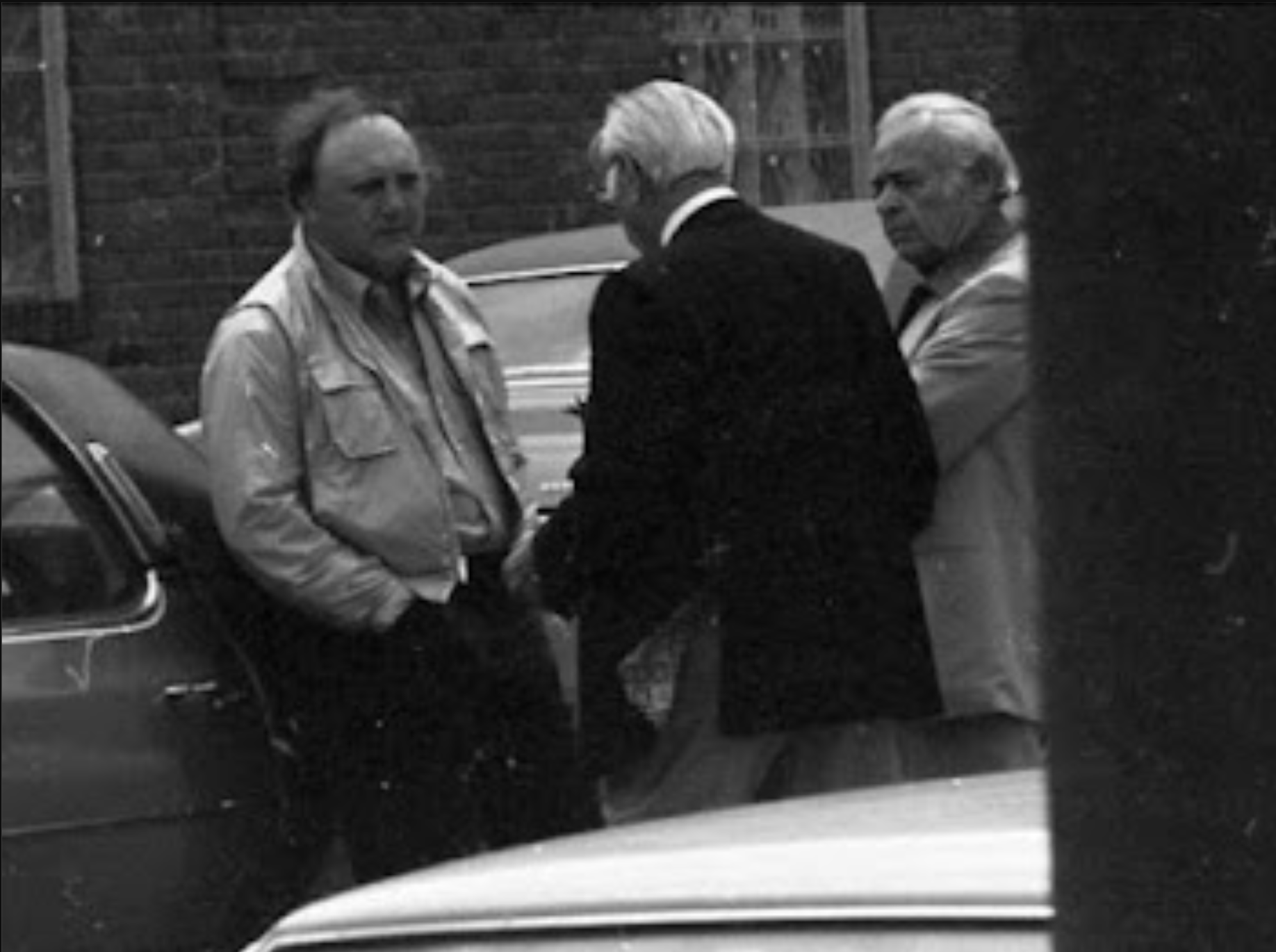
FBI photo of Thomas Ciancutti (L) John LaRocca (C) and Louis Volpe (R) on June 9, 1980, at Allegheny Car Wash

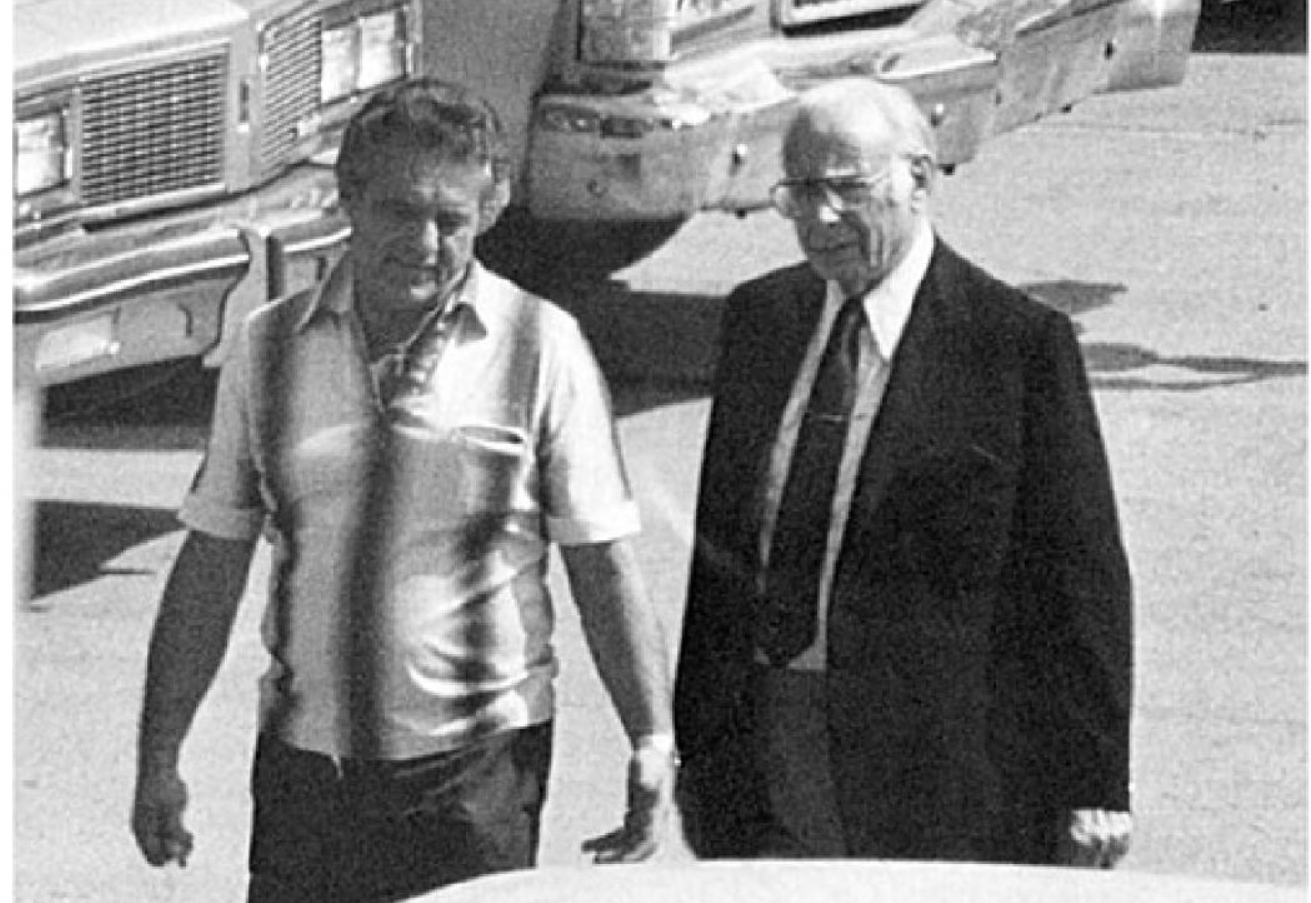
FBI surveillance photo of John LaRocca (right) and Anthony Capizzi at Allegheny Car Wash in 1984

In 1956, LaRocca succeeded longtime crime boss Frank Amato as head of criminal operations in Pittsburgh and Southwestern Pennsylvania. LaRocca and two of his captains, Gabriel "Kelly" Mannarino and Michael James Genovese, were among the one hundred-plus Mafiosi who attended the legendary Apalachin Meeting in 1957.

According to the Chicago Tribune, "The U.S. Immigration and Naturalization Service began deportation proceedings against him in 1956 on grounds that his criminal record made him an undesirable alien," but he remained in the United States because he was "granted a backdated pardon for his crimes by Pennsylvania Gov. John Fine, causing the deportation proceedings to be dropped."

LaRocca was considered by many to be the most successful of all Pittsburgh godfathers. He worked closely with several bosses including Carlo Gambino of New York City, Angelo Bruno of Philadelphia, Russell Bufalino of Pittston, Nick Civella of Kansas City and Santo Trafficante Jr. of Tampa. LaRocca, Mannarino and Trafficante were partners in the Sans Souci hotel and gambling casino in Havana, Cuba.

== Death ==
LaRocca remained boss until his death from natural causes on December 3, 1984, at the age of 83.
