= Tony Grosso =

American bookmaker (1913-1994)

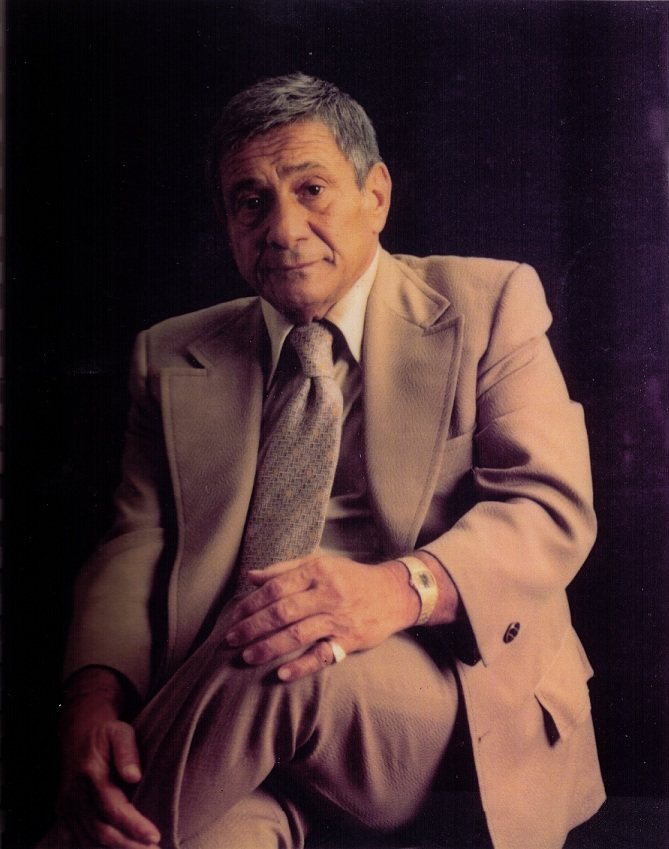
- Tony Grosso 1977
- Born: December 9, 1913; Pittsburgh, Pennsylvania
- Died: August 12, 1994 (aged 80); Jeannette, Pennsylvania
- Resting place: Queen of Heaven cemetery
- Spouse: Angela (1940-1994) (his death)
- Children: 1

Tony Grosso (December 9, 1913 – August 12, 1994) was an American bookmaker from Pittsburgh, Pennsylvania.

== Biography ==
Anthony M. Grosso was born December 9, 1913. A native of Pittsburgh's Hill District, beginning in 1938, he was involved in running an illegal daily lottery in the area. At its peak in the late 1960s, his business employed an estimated 5,000 people and grossed $30 million a year.

Grosso served 28 months in jail for racketeering after a 1973 conviction and in 1986 was sentenced to 14 years in prison for violating federal gambling laws and evading taxes. Upon his release from federal prison in Texas in 1991, Grosso immediately entered a state penitentiary to serve additional time for running the numbers business and criminal conspiracy.

Following his 1987 incarceration, his business was taken over by Junior and Salvatore Williams.

Grosso was known to have many ingenious even comical defenses. One caught the eye of businessman Malcolm Forbes after Grosso beat the IRS trying to hold his wife Angela responsible for his tax evasion crime:

After Anthony Grosso, an operator of an illegal numbers lottery, was caught and convicted, the IRS demanded that his wife, Angela, pony up the unpaid income tax on Anthony's huge illegal income. Though they had filed a joint return, her husband maintained that Angela knew nothing of the unreported sums. "Under the Italian custom, we have a way of not telling our wives anything. We don't want to hurt them," Grosso explained. The Tax Court agreed and rejected the IRS argument that Angela knew about her husband's "take."

=== Politics ===
Grosso had a brief foray into politics in the late 1970s. It was rumored Grosso backed the same man who was able to sentence him to jail earlier. Even though former PA state governor and US attorney general Dick Thornburgh denied Grosso's support many said Grosso spoke of spending over a million dollars on his campaign against former Pittsburgh Mayor Pete Flaherty. Grosso was said to have hired flying billboards to circle over Friday night football games saying "Don't elect a crook for governor Pennsylvania". The signs were thought to be referring to Pete Flaherty.

While trying to gain his freedom in the early 1990s, Grosso became disappointed in Thornburgh with his lack of effort in aiding him in his release from jail. Some family member's felt Grosso was troubled by his treatment of Flaherty saying it was one of the only regrets of his life. In the end, Grosso always felt Flaherty was a "good Man" and spoke of his lapse in judgment days before his death. Grosso was never able to apologize to Flaherty before his passing. Grosso's involvement in the campaign probably cost Flaherty the Governorship. Time magazine reported the alleged antics of Grosso during the year of Flaherty's run.

Grosso is also mentioned on the downfall and investigation of Allegheny County District Attorney Robert Duggan in 1973.

=== Marriage and children ===
Tony and Angela Grosso were married on June 10, 1940. (She died in 1998.) The couple has one daughter, Patty, who resided in Upper St. Clair, Pennsylvania, with her husband, Carmine Bellini Jr., and their four children until she died January 1, 2016, at the age of 72.

=== Death and afterward ===
Grosso died August 12, 1994, at a prison medical center in Jeannette, Pennsylvania, with his family at his side.
