= Annabel Morris Holvey =

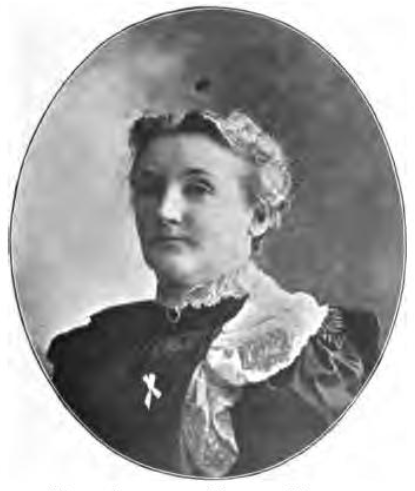
- Born: Annabel Freeman; October 4, 1855; Root, New York, U.S.
- Died: February 17, 1910 (aged 54); West Pittston, Pennsylvania, U.S.
- Occupation: newspaper editor; newspaper publisher; author; lecturer; social reformer; school teacher
- Spouse: George D. Morris; William H. Holvey (m. 1882)
- Relatives: John D. Freeman (uncle); Zachary Taylor (cousin)

Annabel Morris Holvey (née, Freeman; October 4, 1855 – February 17, 1910) was an American newspaper editor, publisher, and author of the long nineteenth century, as well as a lecturer and social reformer in the American temperance movement. Her involvement with the Woman's Christian Temperance Union (WCTU) led her to become widely known on behalf of the temperance cause.

== Early life and education ==
Annabel Freeman was born in Root, New York, October 4, 1855. Her parents were Matthew and Jane Taylor (Seeley) Freeman. Her ancestors dated their history in the United States back into pre-Revolutionary times, and many of them had prominent parts in the history of that era. Holvey's great-great-grandfather was Peter Harkinson, who was sheriff of Monmouth County, New Jersey during the Revolutionary War. Her great-grandfather was Judge William VanBrunt, of New Jersey. Elisha Taylor, one of her ancestors, was prominent in the temperance movement as far back as Revolutionary days. Holvey was a niece of General John D. Freeman, who was attorney general of Mississippi and who served his State in the lower house of Congress. Her mother was a cousin of President Zachary Taylor.

As a child, she lived in Cobleskill. Here, her father was editor of the Jeffersonian, a weekly newspaper. He was one of the first as well as one of the most ardent advocates of the abolition of slavery, and espoused the abolition cause in his newspaper and on the platform.

When Holvey was 11 years old, her mother died and soon afterward, Holvey went to Albany, New York to make her home with her uncle, D. W. Seeley, who invented the Seeley hay and cotton press. In this city, she received her education.

== Career ==
At the age of 16, she married in Albany, George D. Morris, who died four years later, leaving her with three small children. While in Albany, she contributed poems and prose sketches to the Albany Evening Journal and other New York papers.

Relatives at this time made offers to take into their homes her children and care for them separately, but she refused to break up her family. At the time of her husband's death, one of Holvey's brothers, J. W. Freeman, was a resident of Pittston, Pennsylvania, having been editor and proprietor of the Gazette for a year, and later, editor and proprietor of the Pittston Comet, and through him, she removed to Pittston in the Wyoming Valley in 1876, with her three small children. While living in Pittston and West Pittston, Pennsylvania, she was engaged as a school teacher. She not only taught a public school, but also instructed private pupils at night in order that she might maintain her family together.

On June 15, 1882, she married William H. Holvey, a resident of West Pittston. Her first service in Pittston was as a public school teacher. While residing in West Pittston, Holvey served as Superintendent and publisher of the national newspaper of the WCTU. For a number of years, she served as editor of the state organ of the WCTU, The Bulletin, and she was also the assistant editor of The People, a Prohibition organ printed for several years in Scranton, Pennsylvania. She held the position of Pennsylvania state lecturer for the WCTU. Holvey was engaged for many years in reform work that took her frequently for weeks at a time on lecturing tours of Pennsylvania and other states for the temperance cause and other reforms, too. She delivered 106 lecturers.

Her lyrics appeared mostly in the Pittston Gazette, as well as in Wilkes-Barre, Pennsylvania and Scranton papers. They were distinguished by imagery, depth of sentiment, and a fluent but sometimes careless flow of melody that showed how her thoughts flowed naturally to music. "The Pansy's Message" tells a story of war times in verse. "Starlight", "Twilight Musings", "Passion Week", and "Dividing the Church" were inspired by her feelings. "Outcast", probably her strongest poem, was characterized as being full of passion and power. She also wrote some short stories and occasional articles for articles.

== Personal life and death ==
Holvey was a member of the West Pittston Presbyterian Church. For the last three years of her life, Holvey had been in ill health and her ailment developed into cancer. She died at her home in West Pittston, February 17, 1910.

== Selected works ==
=== Poems ===
- "The Pansy's Message"
- "Starlight"
- "Twilight Musings"
- "Passion Week"
- "Dividing the Church"
