= Myron Thomas =

American coal miner

Myron Thomas (January 1916 – September 1987) was an American coal miner in northeastern Pennsylvania, and a hero of the Knox Mine Disaster when he led a group of 24 survivors to safety.

== Mining career ==
Thomas became an assistant foreman in the mines in 1945. On January 22, 1959, Myron Thomas was working at the River Slope Mine in Port Griffith, near Pittston, Pennsylvania, when the mine became flooded with icy water from the Susquehanna River. Thomas recalled the sound as being "like two fast freight trains passing in a tunnel." He led two dozen men through chest-high icy water for more than seven hours, until they reached the only remaining exit, Eagle Shaft. Thomas said that he repeated the 23rd Psalm through the ordeal. "I was ready to die," he explained.

== After Knox ==
Myron Thomas testified at the legislative hearing into the disaster, along with many of the other survivors. He was also called to testify at the trial of the Knox Mine Company owners, the following year.

After coal mining, he was a state highway superintendent. He had black lung as an older man, from his years as a coal miner. He died in September 1987, age 72. Thomas's grave is in a small wooded miners' cemetery in Taylor, Pennsylvania.

== Legacy ==
In 2016, a documentary tribute to Myron Thomas, made by Al and David Brocca, was shown at the Annual Knox Mine Disaster Remembrance Program, at the Pennsylvania Anthracite Heritage Museum in Scranton. Thomas's grandson Robert J. Thomas also spoke on the occasion.

There are folk ballads telling the story of the Knox Mine Disaster, including several that mention Myron Thomas; "Last Day of the Northern Field" is subtitled "Ballad of Myron Thomas."
