= West Pittston, Pennsylvania =

Borough in Pennsylvania, US

- Borough
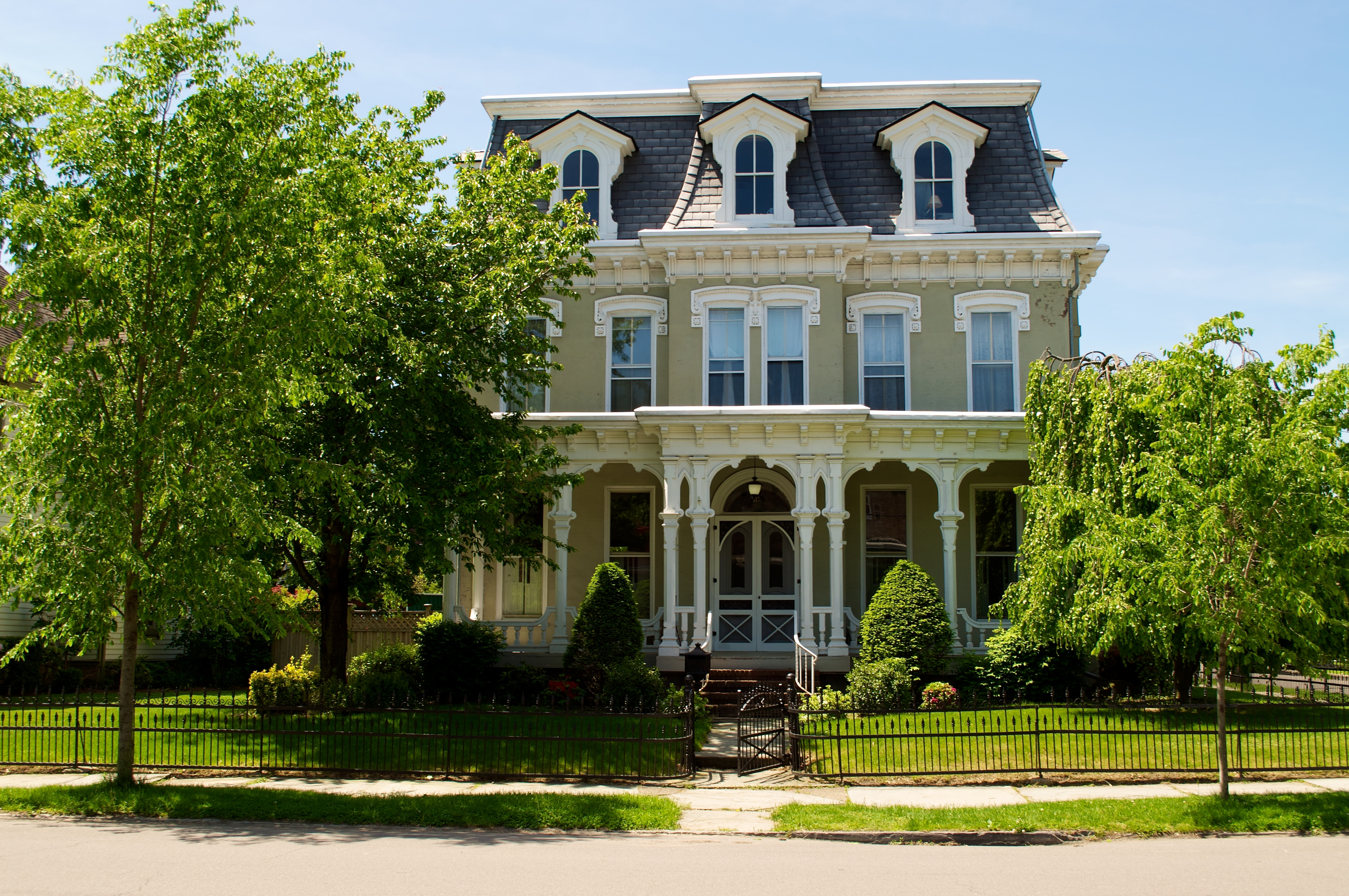
- A home on Luzerne Avenue in West Pittston
- Nickname: The Garden Village
- Location of West Pittston in Luzerne County, Pennsylvania

- Location within Pennsylvania Location within the United States
- Coordinates: 41°19′45.35″N 75°47′56.57″W
- Country: United States
- State: Pennsylvania
- County: Luzerne
- Region: Greater Pittston
- Settled: 1778
- Incorporated: 1857

Government
  - Type: Borough Council
  - Mayor: Angelo Alfano

Area
  - Total: 0.94 sq mi (2.43 km^{2})
  - Land: 0.82 sq mi (2.12 km^{2})
  - Water: 0.12 sq mi (0.31 km^{2})

Population (2020)
  - Total: 4,644 ▼
  - Estimate (2021): 4,636
  - Density: 5,809.0/sq mi (2,242.86/km^{2})
- Time zone: UTC-5 (Eastern (EST))
  - Summer (DST): UTC-4 (EDT)
- Zip code: 18643
- Area code: 570
- FIPS code: 42-83856
- Website: westpittstonborough.com

West Pittston is a borough in the Greater Pittston area of Luzerne County, Pennsylvania, United States. It is located on the Susquehanna River (opposite of Pittston City). In 2020, the population was 4,644.

The town once produced mine screens, glass, crackers, and many other goods. West Pittston rose to national attention in September 2011, when catastrophic flooding (caused by the remnants of Tropical Storm Lee) left much of the borough under water.

== History ==
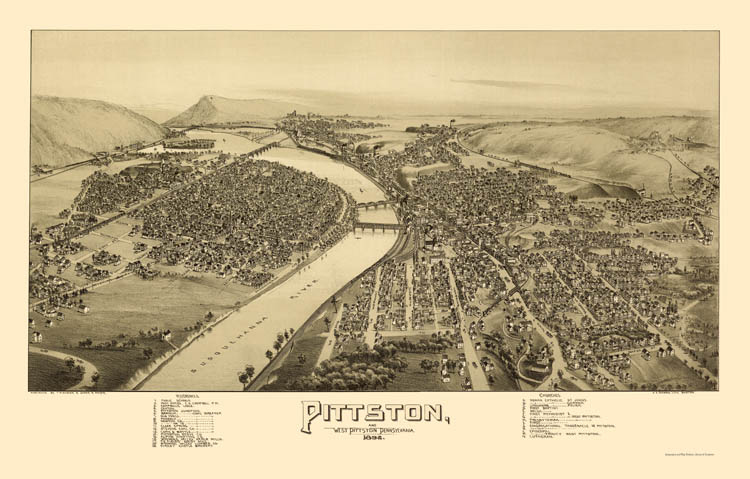
1892 panoramic map of Pittston and West Pittston; West Pittston is visible on the left

West Pittston was settled in the 1770s. On July 1, 1778, during the Revolutionary War, Fort Jenkins (a patriot stockade in present-day West Pittston) surrendered to the British (under Major John Butler). It was later burned to the ground. On July 3, the Battle of Wyoming was fought only several miles outside of West Pittston. It was incorporated as a borough in 1857. The West Pittston Police Department was also established that same year. West Pittston was the home of Company D, 1st Battalion, 109th Infantry Regiment, which is part of the 28th Infantry Division.

Two bridges were constructed over the Susquehanna River connecting Pittston City and West Pittston. In 1914, the Penn Bridge Company constructed the Water Street Bridge. Today, the Water Street Bridge (Firefighters’ Memorial Bridge) is illuminated by fiber-optic cable. The colors of the lights can be changed manually to reflect holidays and local sporting rivalries.

In 1928, a parallel bridge (the Fort Jenkins Bridge) was constructed north of the Water Street Bridge. The Fort Jenkins Bridge, which was later renamed the Dale J. Kridlo Memorial Bridge, is part of U.S. Route 11. U.S. 11 runs through the heart of West Pittston.

In June 1972, Hurricane Agnes was responsible for massive flooding in and around the Greater Pittston area. From 1974 to 1989, alleged ghost hauntings took place in the home of Jack and Janet Smurl in West Pittston; it inspired both the 1991 film The Haunted and the 2025 film The Conjuring: Last Rites.

On September 8, 2011, the Susquehanna River, spurred by heavy rains from Tropical Storm Lee, crested at a record 42.66 feet (13.00 m). It flooded more than a quarter of the town. This was considered to be a historic flooding event which displaced thousands of people and caused millions of dollars in damages to businesses and homes. Following record flooding, the non-profit organization West Pittston Tomorrow was founded. Its purpose was to improve the damaged community. It expanded the public library and created community gardens.

== Geography ==
West Pittston is located at 41°19′45″N 75°47′57″W (41.329265, -75.799048).

According to the United States Census Bureau, the borough has a total area of 0.97 square miles (2.5 km^{2}), of which 0.81 square miles (2.1 km^{2}) is land and 0.15 square miles (0.4 km^{2}), or 15.10%, is water. West Pittston lies on the western side of the Susquehanna River in northern Luzerne County. The City of Wilkes-Barre is located to the southwest. The City of Pittston is located directly across the river (to the east). The borough is situated within the Wyoming Area School District.

=== Townscape ===
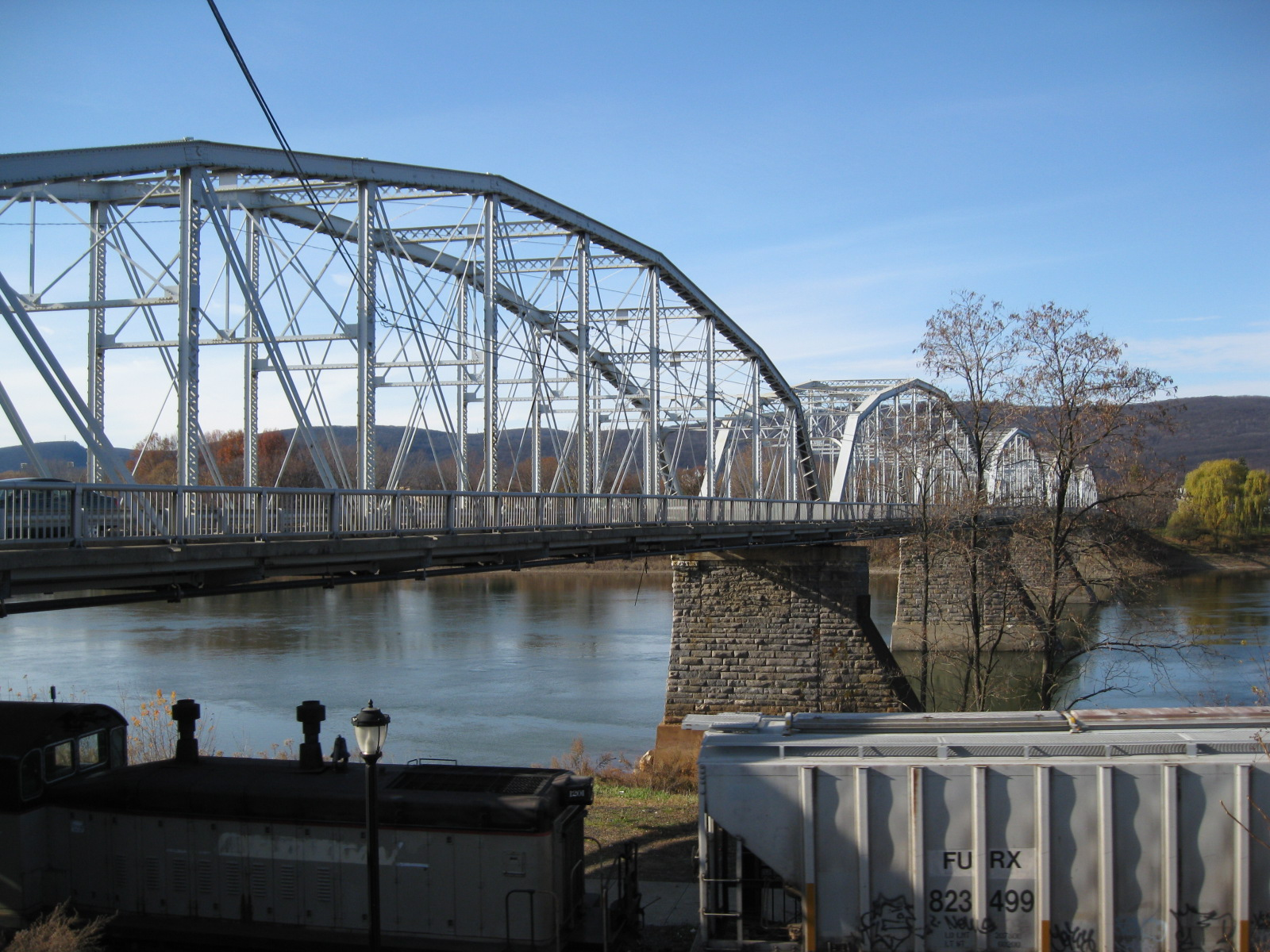
Firefighters' Memorial Bridge facing West Pittston

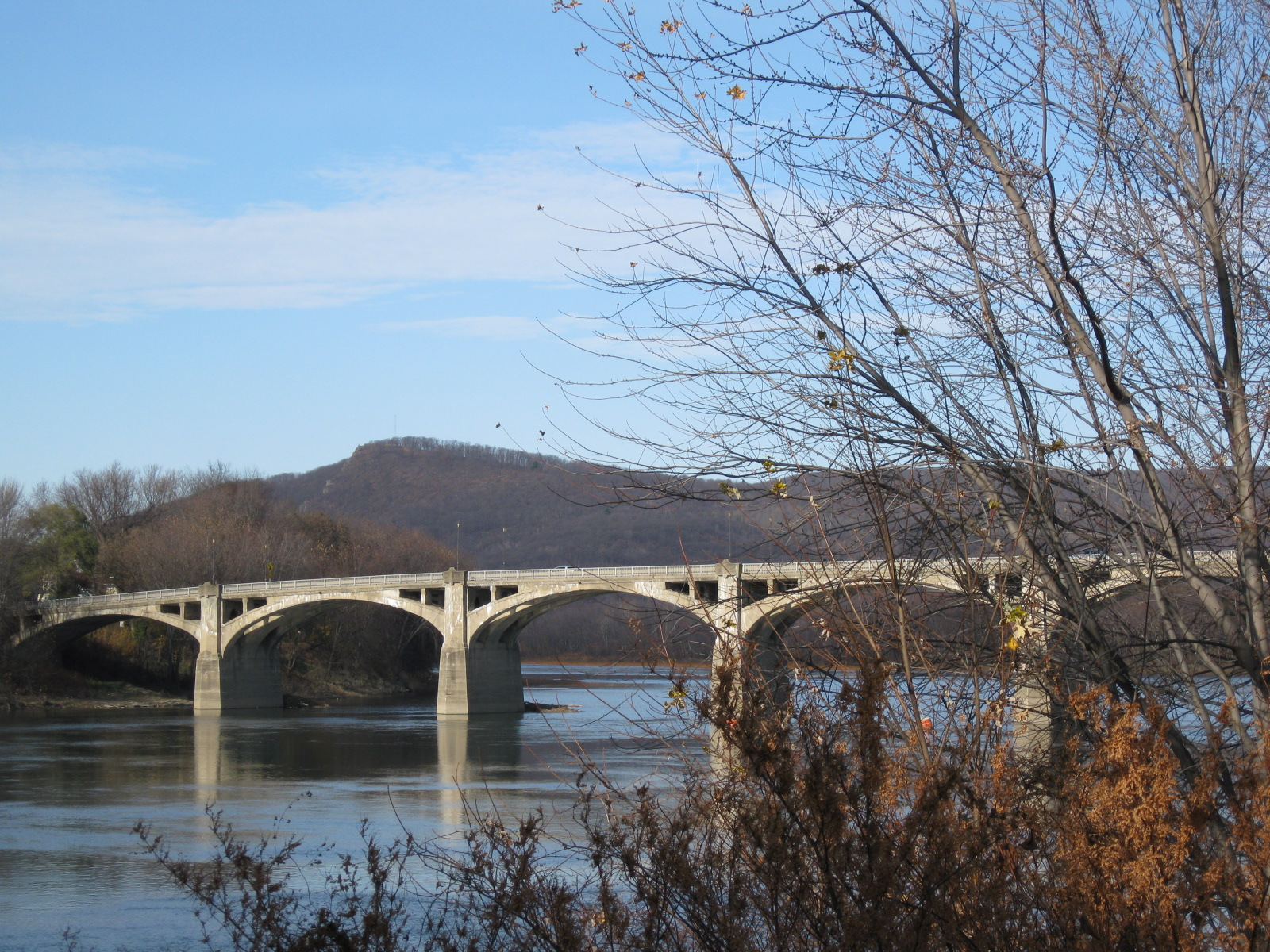
Specialist Dale J. Kridlo Memorial Bridge (U.S. Route 11); West Pittston is on the left

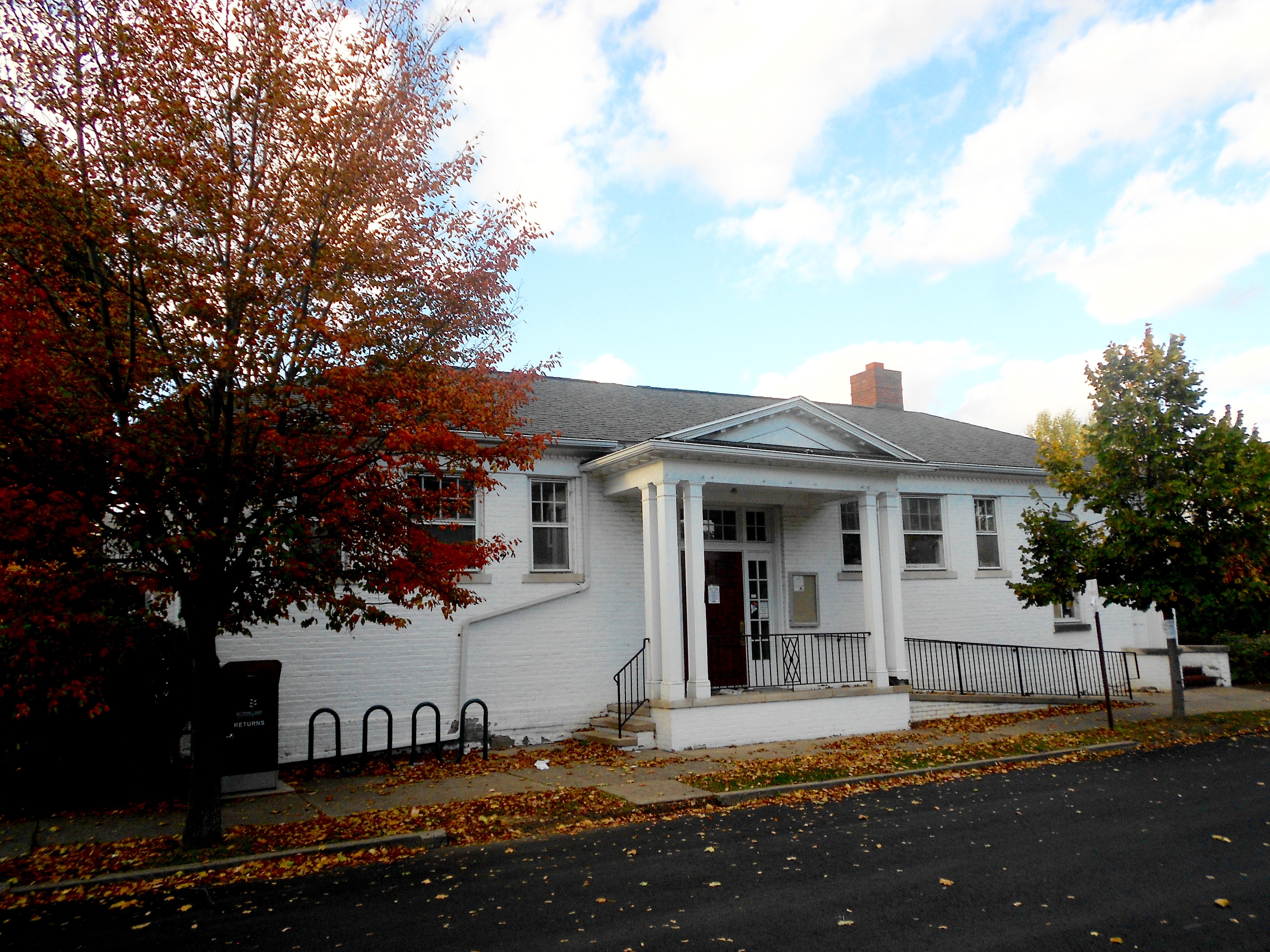
West Pittston Library

West Pittston Municipal Building

Apartment building in West Pittston (formerly the Hitchner Biscuit Company)

== Demographics ==
Historical population
Census	Pop.	Note	%±
1860	599		—
1870	1,416		136.4%
1880	2,544		79.7%
1890	3,906		53.5%
1900	5,846		49.7%
1910	6,848		17.1%
1920	6,968		1.8%
1930	7,940		13.9%
1940	7,943		0.0%
1950	7,230		−9.0%
1960	6,998		−3.2%
1970	7,074		1.1%
1980	5,980		−15.5%
1990	5,590		−6.5%
2000	5,072		−9.3%
2010	4,868		−4.0%
2020	4,652		−4.4%
2021 (est.)	4,636	▼	−0.3%

=== 2020 census ===
As of the 2020 census, West Pittston had a population of 4,652. The median age was 43.3 years. 19.1% of residents were under the age of 18 and 21.9% of residents were 65 years of age or older. For every 100 females there were 91.9 males, and for every 100 females age 18 and over there were 90.0 males age 18 and over.

100.0% of residents lived in urban areas, while 0.0% lived in rural areas.

There were 2,132 households in West Pittston, of which 24.5% had children under the age of 18 living in them. Of all households, 38.1% were married-couple households, 21.5% were households with a male householder and no spouse or partner present, and 32.6% were households with a female householder and no spouse or partner present. About 37.4% of all households were made up of individuals and 19.3% had someone living alone who was 65 years of age or older.

There were 2,387 housing units, of which 10.7% were vacant. The homeowner vacancy rate was 3.3% and the rental vacancy rate was 7.2%.

Racial composition as of the 2020 census
Race	Number	Percent
White	4,197	90.2%
Black or African American	113	2.4%
American Indian and Alaska Native	1	0.0%
Asian	37	0.8%
Native Hawaiian and Other Pacific Islander	1	0.0%
Some other race	49	1.1%
Two or more races	254	5.5%
Hispanic or Latino (of any race)	169	3.6%

=== 2000 census ===
As of the census of 2000, there were 5,072 people, 2,243 households, and 1,397 families residing in the borough. The population density was 6,199.1 inhabitants per square mile (2,393.5/km^{2}). There were 2,381 housing units at an average density of 2,910.1 per square mile (1,123.6/km^{2}). The racial makeup of the borough was 98.8% White, 0.3% African American, 0.00% Native American, 0.1% Asian, 0.00% from other races, and 0.3% from two or more races. Hispanic or Latino of any race were 0.4% of the population.

There were 2,243 households, out of which 24.2% had children under the age of 18 living with them, 46.4% were married couples living together, 12.3% had a female householder with no husband present, and 37.7% were non-families. 34.0% of all households were made up of individuals, and 19.5% had someone living alone who was 65 years of age or older. The average household size was 2.26 and the average family size was 2.92.

In the borough the population was spread out, with 20.0% under the age of 18, 6.5% from 18 to 24, 27.3% from 25 to 44, 23.4% from 45 to 64, and 22.9% who were 65 years of age or older. The median age was 42 years. For every 100 females, there were 82.4 males. For every 100 females age 18 and over, there were 77.5 males.

The median income for a household in the borough was $33,030, and the median income for a family was $41,729. Males had a median income of $35,386 versus $20,656 for females. The per capita income for the borough was $20,370. About 9.6% of families and 10.1% of the population were below the poverty line, including 20.5% of those under age 18 and 8.4% of those age 65 or over.

== Education ==
It is in the Wyoming Area School District.

== Culture ==
West Pittston has an annual Cherry Blossom Festival. The event usually consists of bands, food, and a parade. The parade includes the Wyoming Area Marching Band, Little League teams, Boy Scout troops, and various local emergency service crews. The festival also includes musical concerts, skit shows, and a Miss Cherry Blossom contest.

- Sister city is Gualdo Tadino, Italy

== Notable people ==
- Annabel Morris Holvey (1855–1910), newspaper editor, social reformer
- Marion Lorne, actress, born in West Pittston
- Anne Sargent, actress
- Susan E. Dickinson, journalist
