= Firefighters' Memorial Bridge (Pittston, Pennsylvania) =

Bridge in Pennsylvania, United States

Water Street Bridge
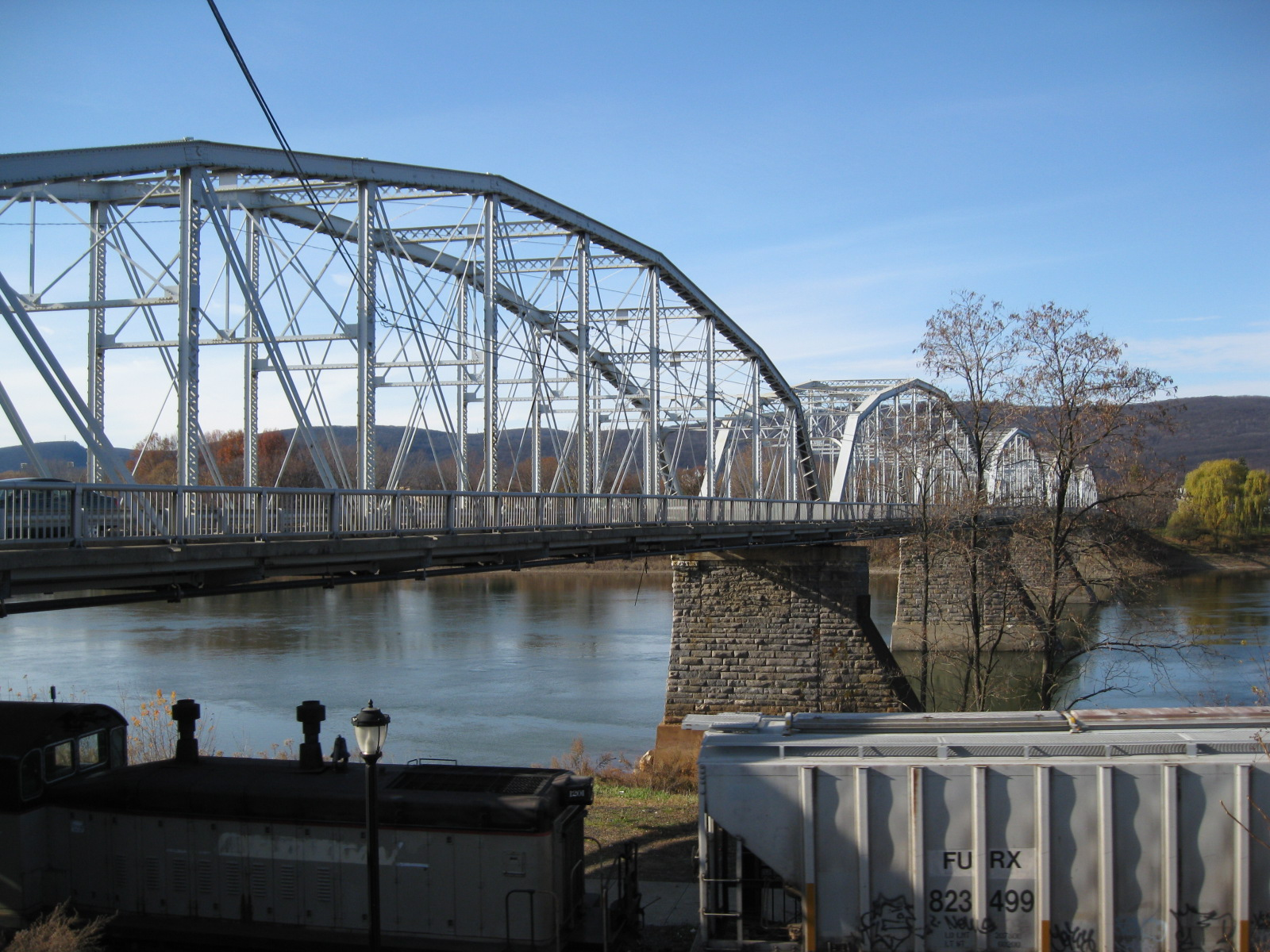
- Coordinates: 41°19′N 75°47′W
- Crosses: Susquehanna River
- Locale: Luzerne County, Pennsylvania
- Official name: Fire Fighters' Memorial Bridge

Characteristics
- Total length: 1,016 feet (310 m)
- Width: 21 feet (6.4 m)
- Longest span: 202 feet (62 m)
- No. of spans: 5

History
- Constructed by: Penn Bridge Company
- Construction end: 1914

Water Street Bridge is a truss bridge that spans the Susquehanna River between West Pittston, Pennsylvania and Pittston, Pennsylvania. It was built in 1914 by the Penn Bridge Company.

== Composition ==
The Water Street Bridge is a metal pinned parker through truss bridge. It has 5 spans, which are the 'arches.' Each span length is 202 feet. The bridge is not maintained by PennDOT and is therefore not in the line of bridges being decommissioned by PennDOT around the state.

== History ==
The Water Street Bridge was built in 1914 by the Penn Bridge Company of Beaver Falls, Pennsylvania. It was originally a steel grate bridge until 1984.

The Water Street Bridge faced Hurricane Agnes in 1972 and also the Flood of '06, as it has been called when 12–20 foot waters covered the Riverfront Park, and coming up and smothering the railroad tracks that are 19 feet above the river. The bridge's height at this point was about 20 feet, compared to the average 50–40 feet. Recently, the September 2011 flood caused the city to close this and another bridge in Pittston. So, far the bridge is still standing, but a bridge named Slabtown Bridge in near Lycoming County has been wiped out.

The bridge was closed indefinitely following inspections in August 2021.

== Official name ==
The bridge was renamed the Fire Fighters' Memorial Bridge in 2008 to remember the fallen firefighters who died near there.

== A parallel bridge ==
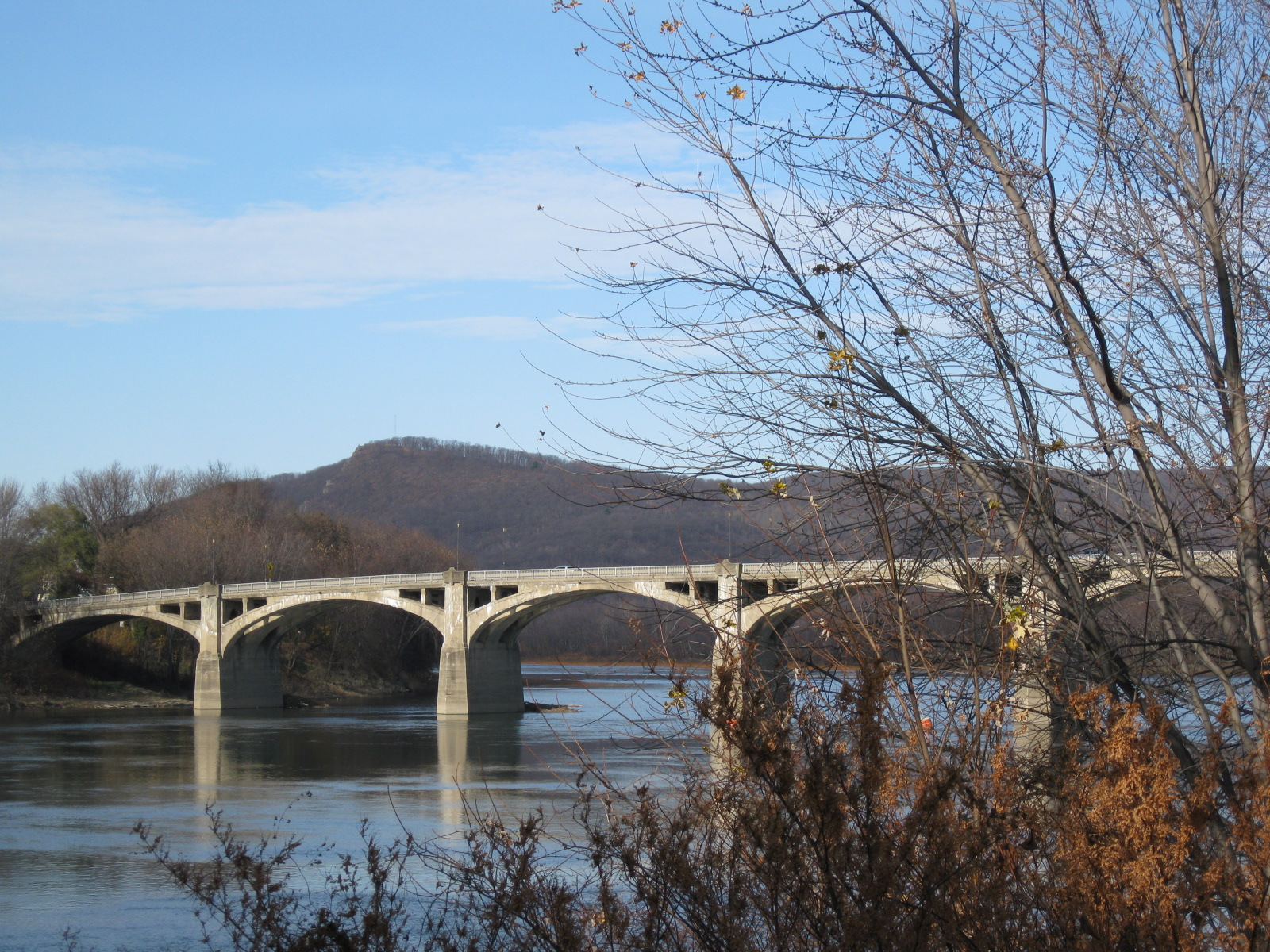
The neighboring Specialist Dale J. Kridlo Memorial Bridge (or Fort Jenkins Bridge)

In 1924, a parallel bridge (the Fort Jenkins Bridge) was constructed north of the Water Street Bridge; it is part of U.S. Route 11. In 2017, the bridge was renamed the Specialist Dale J. Kridlo Memorial Bridge.
