= Pittston, Pennsylvania =

City in Pennsylvania, US

- City
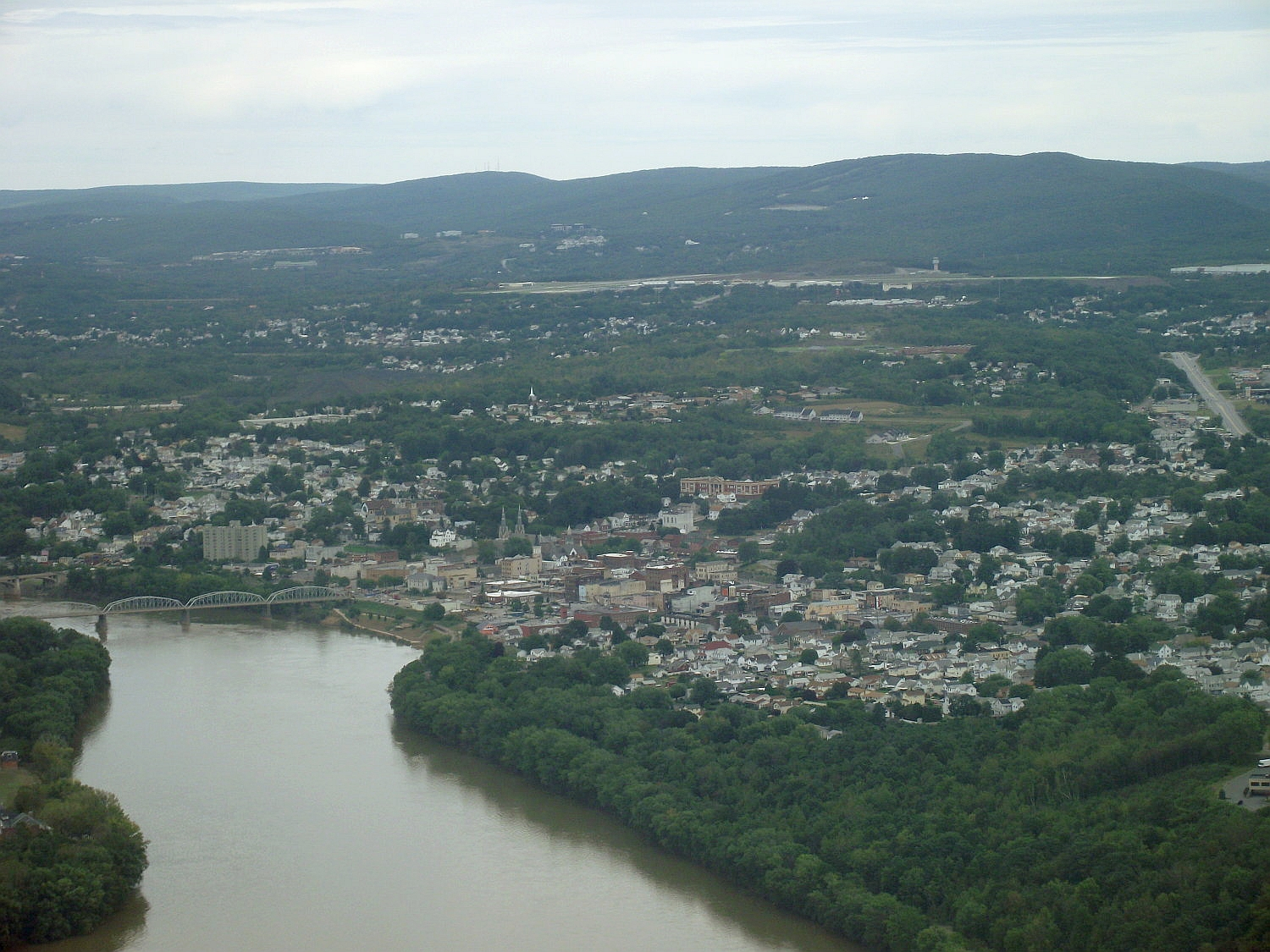
- Pittston in September 2011

- Flag Seal Logo
- Nickname: "The Quality Tomato Capital of the World"
- Location of Pittston in Luzerne County, Pennsylvania

- Location within Pennsylvania Location within the United States
- Coordinates: 41°19′26″N 75°47′20″W
- Country: United States
- State: Pennsylvania
- County: Luzerne
- Region: Greater Pittston
- Settled: 1770
- Incorporated (borough): April 30, 1853
- Incorporated (city): December 10, 1894

Government
  - Type: City Council
  - Mayor: Michael Lombardo (D)

Area
  - Total: 1.71 sq mi (4.44 km^{2})
  - Land: 1.53 sq mi (3.96 km^{2})
  - Water: 0.19 sq mi (0.48 km^{2})
- Elevation: 653 ft (199 m)

Population (2020)
  - Total: 7,591
  - Density: 4,959.9/sq mi (1,915.03/km^{2})
- Time zone: UTC-5 (Eastern (EST))
  - Summer (DST): UTC-4 (EDT)
- Zip Codes: 18640-18644
- Area codes: 570 & 272
- FIPS code: 42-61048
- Website: www.pittstoncity.gov

Pittston is a city in Luzerne County, Pennsylvania, United States. The city lies in the Wyoming Valley on the east side of the Susquehanna River and on the south side of the Lackawanna River. It is approximately midway between Wilkes-Barre and Scranton. Pittston is 68.7 miles (110.6 km) north of Allentown and 129.2 miles (207.9 km) northwest of New York City.

The population was 7,591 as of the 2020 census, making it Luzerne County's fourth-largest city. At its peak in 1920, the population of Pittston was 18,497. The city consists of three sections: Downtown Pittston in the city's center, the Oregon Section in the city's southern end, and the Junction in the city's northern end. Pittston City is at the heart of the Greater Pittston region, a 65.35 square mile region in Luzerne County. Greater Pittston has a total population of 48,020 as of 2010.

Named after the British statesman William Pitt the Elder, the city was settled around 1770 by the Susquehanna Company of Connecticut. It was originally called "Pittstown." The city gained prominence in the late 19th and early 20th centuries as an active anthracite coal mining city, drawing a large portion of its labor force from European immigrants.

== History ==
=== American Revolutionary War ===
During the Revolutionary War, the Wyoming Valley became a battleground between the British and the Americans. On July 3, 1778, a force of British provincial soldiers, with the assistance of about 500 Iroquois, attacked and killed about 300 Patriot soldiers at the Battle of Wyoming.

A company of militia, led by Captain Jeremiah Blanchard and Lieutenant Timothy Keyes, held and maintained a military fort in Pittston, which was surrendered on July 4, 1778, one day after the Battle of Wyoming, and was later partially burned. In 1780, Pittston Fort was reoccupied, restored and strengthened. From then on it was under patriot control until the signing of the Treaty of Paris in 1783, which largely brought the war to an end. A marker stands at the site where the fort once stood.

=== Establishment ===
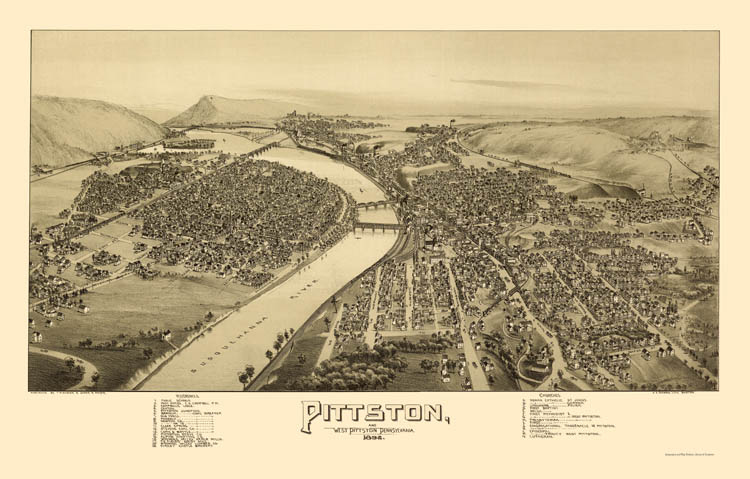
An 1892 panoramic map of Pittston

In 1853, Pittston broke away from Pittston Township and officially became a borough. John Hosie served as the first burgess of the borough. It was later chartered as a city on December 10, 1894. Thomas J. Maloney served as the city's first mayor from 1894 to 1898. Throughout the late 1890s, Pittston's borders extended from Scranton to Wilkes-Barre, but due to financial and civil differences, the community was later divided into several townships and boroughs throughout the Greater Pittston.

=== Coal mining ===
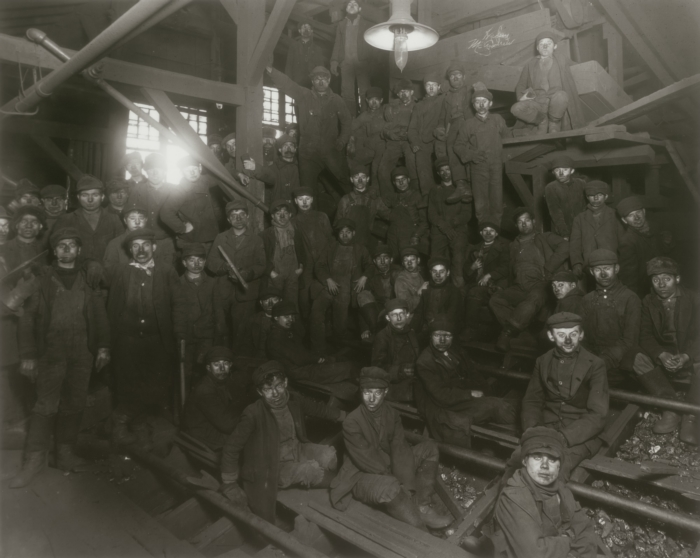
Lewis Hine's photo of child laborers at Pittston coal mine in 1911

Pittston is located within Pennsylvania's Coal Region. The first discovery of the anthracite coal (in the Wyoming Valley) occurred around 1770. The first mine was established in 1775 near Pittston. With the opening of a canal in the 1830s, Pittston became an important link in the coal industry. Money made through the mining and transportation of coal led some of the leading merchants to petition its separation from Pittston Township. The anthracite and railroad industry attracted thousands of immigrants, making Pittston a true melting pot with once-distinct ethnic and class neighborhoods. The population of Pittston boomed in the late 19th century. The boom continued well into the 20th century.

The anthracite coal mining industry, and its extensive use of child labor in the early part of the 20th century, was one of the industries targeted by the National Child Labor Committee and its hired photographer, Lewis Hine. Many of Hine's subjects were photographed in the mines and coal fields in and around Pittston between 1908 and 1912. The impact of the Hine photographs led to the enactment of child labor laws across the country.

==== Mining disasters ====
An illustration of the Twin Shaft disaster in Pittston immediately after the shaft's collapse in 1896

Coal mining remained the prominent industry in Pittston for many decades, but disasters did strike on more than one occasion. The first major tragedy, the Twin Shaft disaster, occurred at the Newton Coal Company near the city's railroad junction. In the early morning hours of June 28, 1896, 90 miners were at work in the Red Ash Vein of the Newton Coal Company's Twin Shaft Mine in Pittston when, at 3:00 am, the roof quickly collapsed. The concussion from the explosion was so great that it was heard for miles around. The foundation of nearly every building in Pittston was shaken. The cave-in killed 58 miners, including the city's then-acting mayor.

Anthracite coal mining remained a major industry in the Greater Pittston region until the Knox Mine disaster. It essentially killed the industry in Northeastern Pennsylvania. On January 22, 1959, the ice-laden Susquehanna River broke through the roof of the River Slope Mine of the Knox Coal Company in nearby Port Griffith (in Jenkins Township). This allowed for billions of gallons of river water to flood the interconnected mines. It took three days to plug the hole in the riverbed, which was done by dumping large railroad cars, smaller mine cars, culm, and other debris into the whirlpool formed by the water draining into the mine.

Sixty-nine miners escaped; twelve miners died and their bodies were never recovered. The heroic efforts of one miner, Myron Thomas of Taylor, led 26 miners to safety. Another group of six men was led by Pacifico "Joe" Stella of Pittston. Amedeo Pancotti was part of the second group, and for his remarkable climb out of the Eagle Air Shaft to the surface; he was later awarded the Carnegie Medal for Heroism from the Carnegie Hero Fund Commission.

At 5:15 pm on November 27, 1942, the cave-in of an anthracite mine, that had not been operated since 1868, caused the earth of a half square mile of Pittston to crack and subside.

The largest crack was "...five feet wide, 150 feet long and so deep the bottom was not visible. Two hundred homes were twisted, cracked or sprung from their foundations. Sidewalks were torn up and gas and water mains snapped in several places. Water cascaded through the streets and flooded cellars."

"Since 1942 the Pennsylvania DEP [Department of Environmental Protection] and its predecessor, Pennsylvania Department of Environmental Resources (PADER), as well as the U.S. Department of the Interior/Office of Surface Mining, Reclamation and Enforcement (OSM), have investigated 149 mine-related subsidence events in the city."

=== Economic rise and fall ===
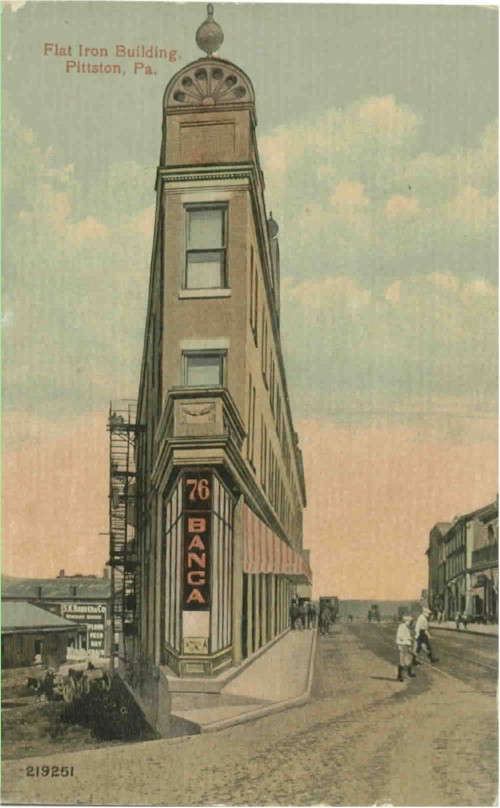
The Flat Iron Building in downtown Pittston in the early 20th century

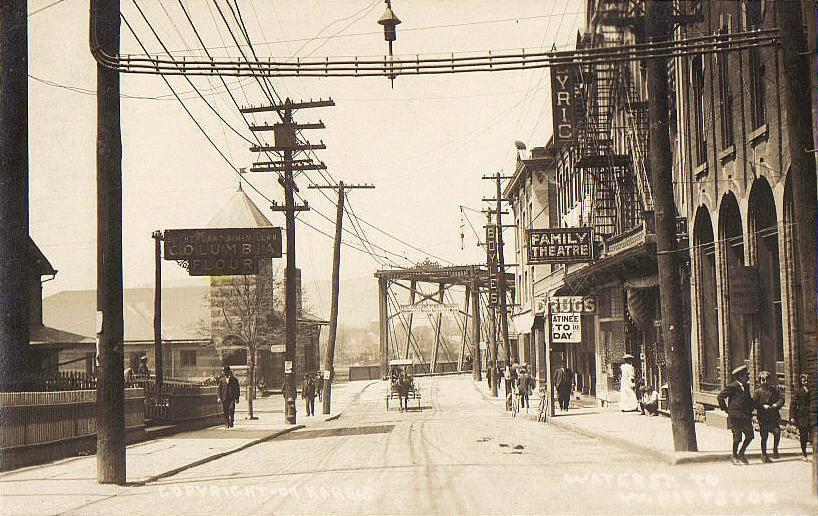
Water Street in 1908

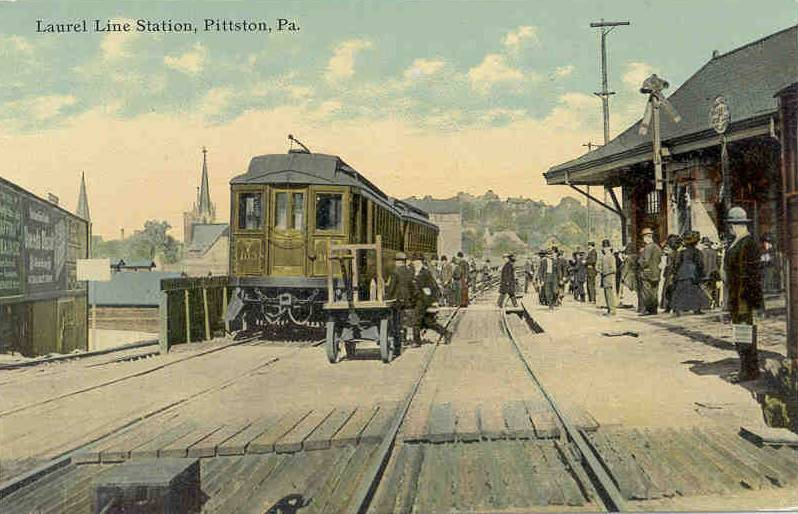
The Laurel Line in Pittston

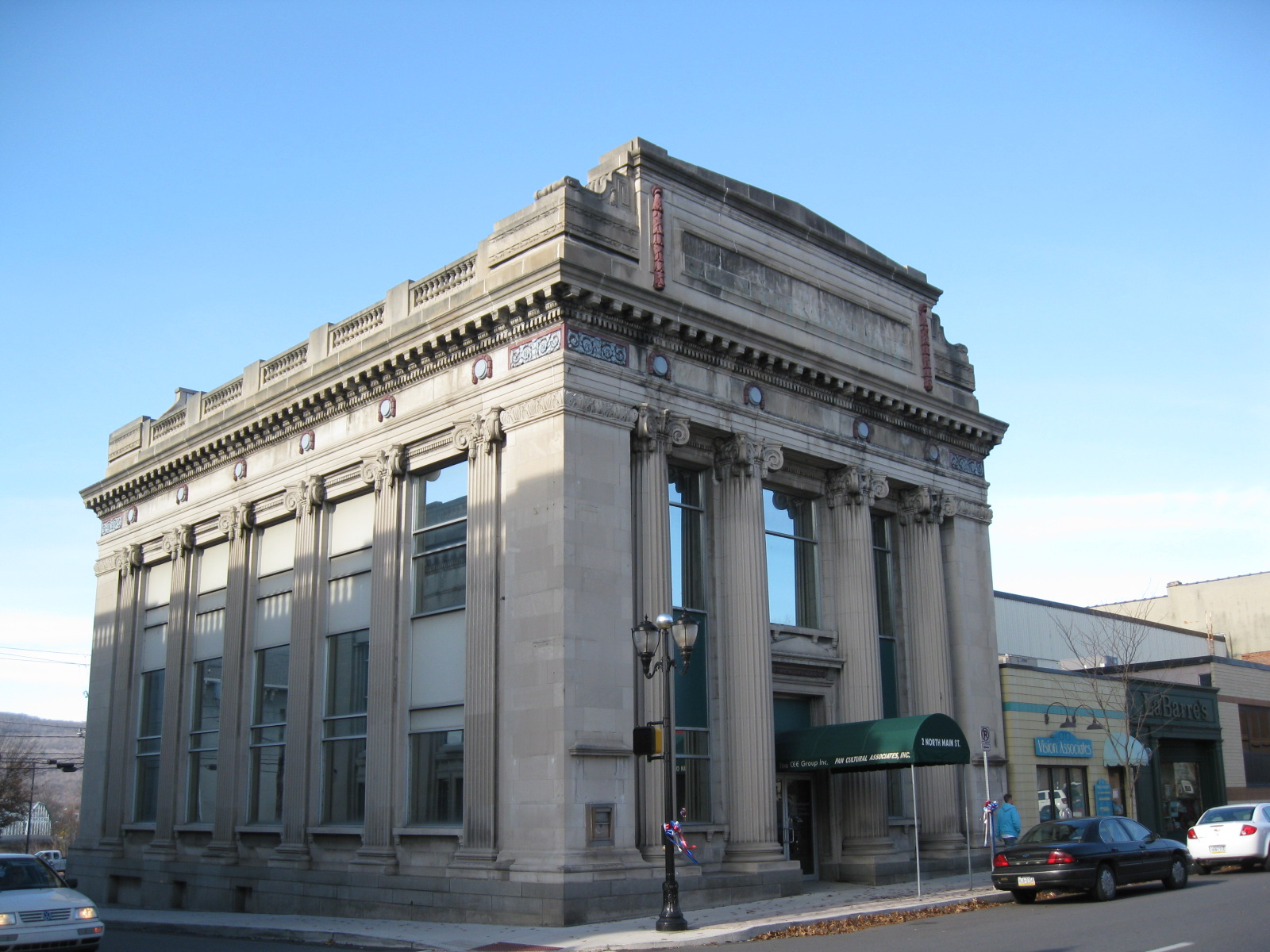
Downtown Pittston

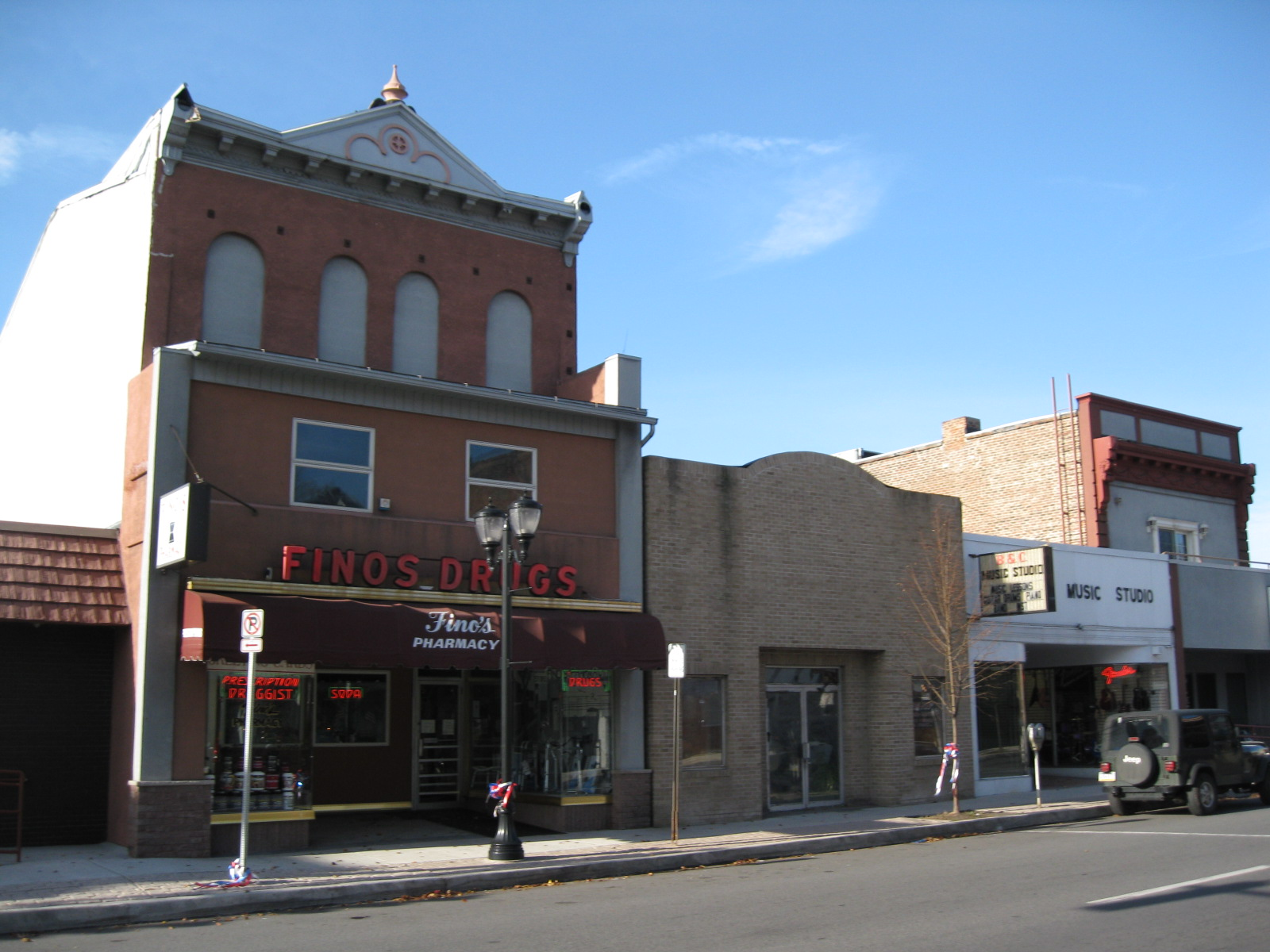
Stores in downtown Pittston

Pittston became an active railroad center in response to its mining and industrial activity. Lehigh Valley Railroad maintained a station in downtown Pittston, near the foot of the Water Street Bridge. The station did not survive the urban renewal of the 1960s and was demolished in 1964. Pittston also had a station on the historic Lackawanna and Wyoming Valley Railroad, commonly known as the Laurel Line.

Besides mining anthracite coal, Pittston was home to many industries in the 19th and 20th centuries, including metals, plastics, paper products, apparel, electrical equipment and beverages. The Pittston Stove Company, established in 1864, manufactured coal and wood-burning stoves for heating and cooking. The Pittston Brewing Company, brewers of Glennon's Beer, maintained operations in Pittston from 1873 until 1948. Evan R. Jones Stoneware crafted pottery which bore the Pittston name in the 1870s and 1880s.

From the 1930s to the 1980s, Pittston City emerged as a national center for clothing manufacturing. Thousands of workers, mainly women, labored in many factories throughout the Greater Pittston area. Most were members of the International Ladies' Garment Workers' Union (ILGWU). They fought for higher wages, workplace health & safety improvements, and employee rights. The ILGWU was active in civic and political life throughout Pennsylvania.

Main Street was the site of an active downtown into the 1970s, featuring clothing stores, shoe stores, jewelers, JC Penneys, Kresge's, Woolworth's, drug stores, restaurants, movie theaters, and banks. It was home to at least two theaters, the Roman at 27 South Main and the American at 48 North Main, both of which have been razed. Many historic commercial structures were demolished in the urban renewal efforts of the 1960s. By the late 20th century, most of the city's factories were closed and shipped overseas. Stores throughout the downtown closed and boarded up over this period. Pittston, like most Rust Belt cities, also witnessed population loss and urban decay.

On March 15, 1993, two Pittston firefighters, John Lombardo and Len Insalaco, were killed while fighting a blaze on the city's main street. A monument was built in the downtown and the nearby Water Street Bridge was renamed to commemorate their sacrifice during that tragic March day.

=== 21st century ===
For decades, the towering spires of the many Protestant and Catholic churches dominated the city's skyline. Most of the numerous Catholic churches were established to serve one of the many ethnic communities that made up Pittston. The Irish had St. John the Evangelist and St. Mary Help of Christians, the Slovaks had St. John the Baptist, the Lithuanians had St. Casimir's, the Germans had St. Mary Assumption, and the Italians had St. Rocco's and Our Lady of Mount Carmel. There is also a Carpatho-Rusyn Byzantine Catholic Church, St. Michael's, on Main Street. From 2004 to the present, the Diocese of Scranton has closed many of the churches and private schools in and around Pittston due to declining population and enrollment. Saint John the Baptist Elementary School closed in 2004, and Seton Catholic High School closed in 2007. St. Mary's Assumption School closed in 2011.

In 2009, Mayor Joseph P. Keating resigned after losing his bid for re-nomination. The city council appointed the first female mayor in the city's history, Donna McFadden-Connors, to serve out the remainder of Keating's term. She was later succeeded in 2010 by the youngest mayor in the city's history, Jason C. Klush.

== Downtown renovation ==
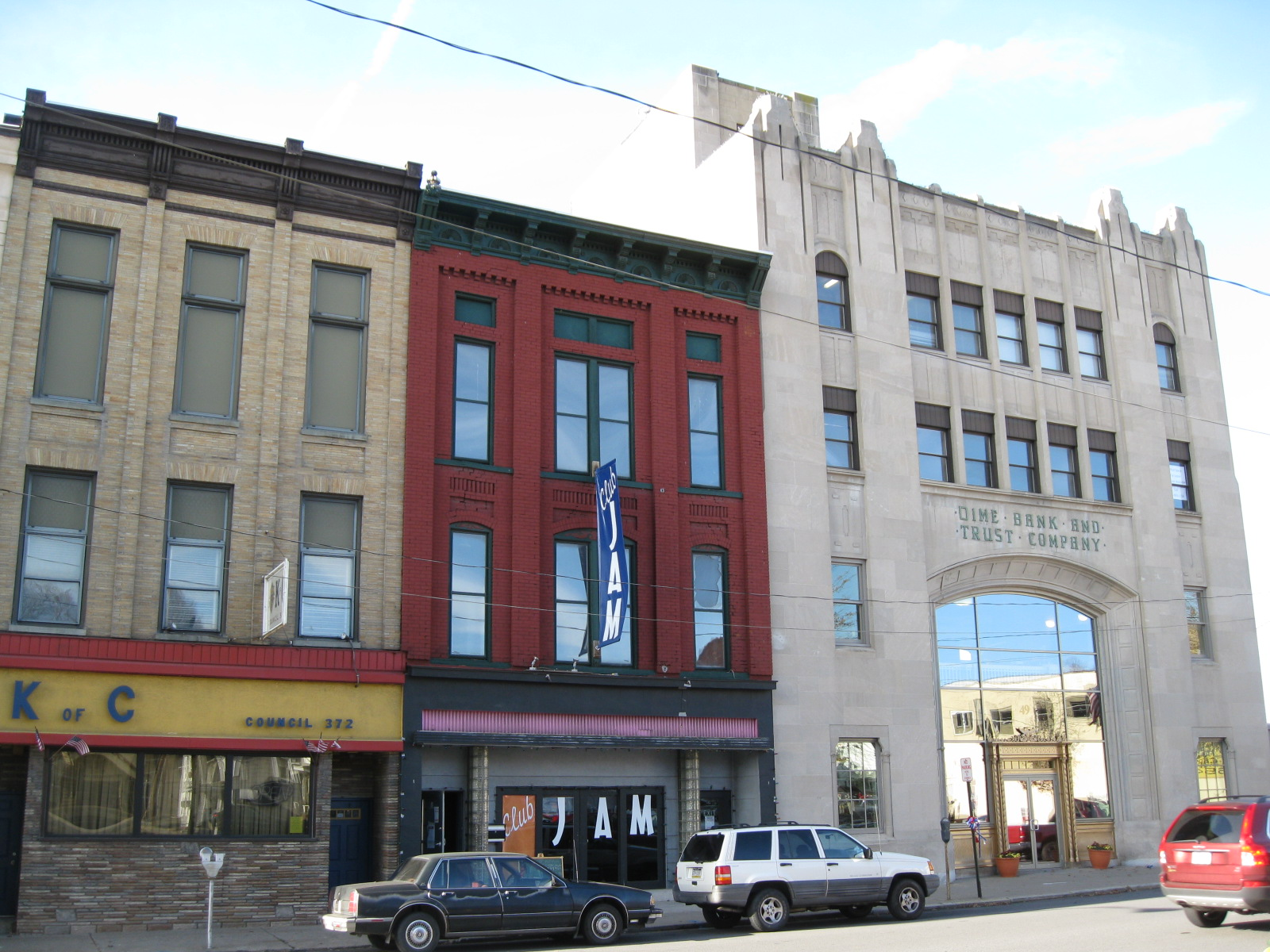
Downtown Pittston

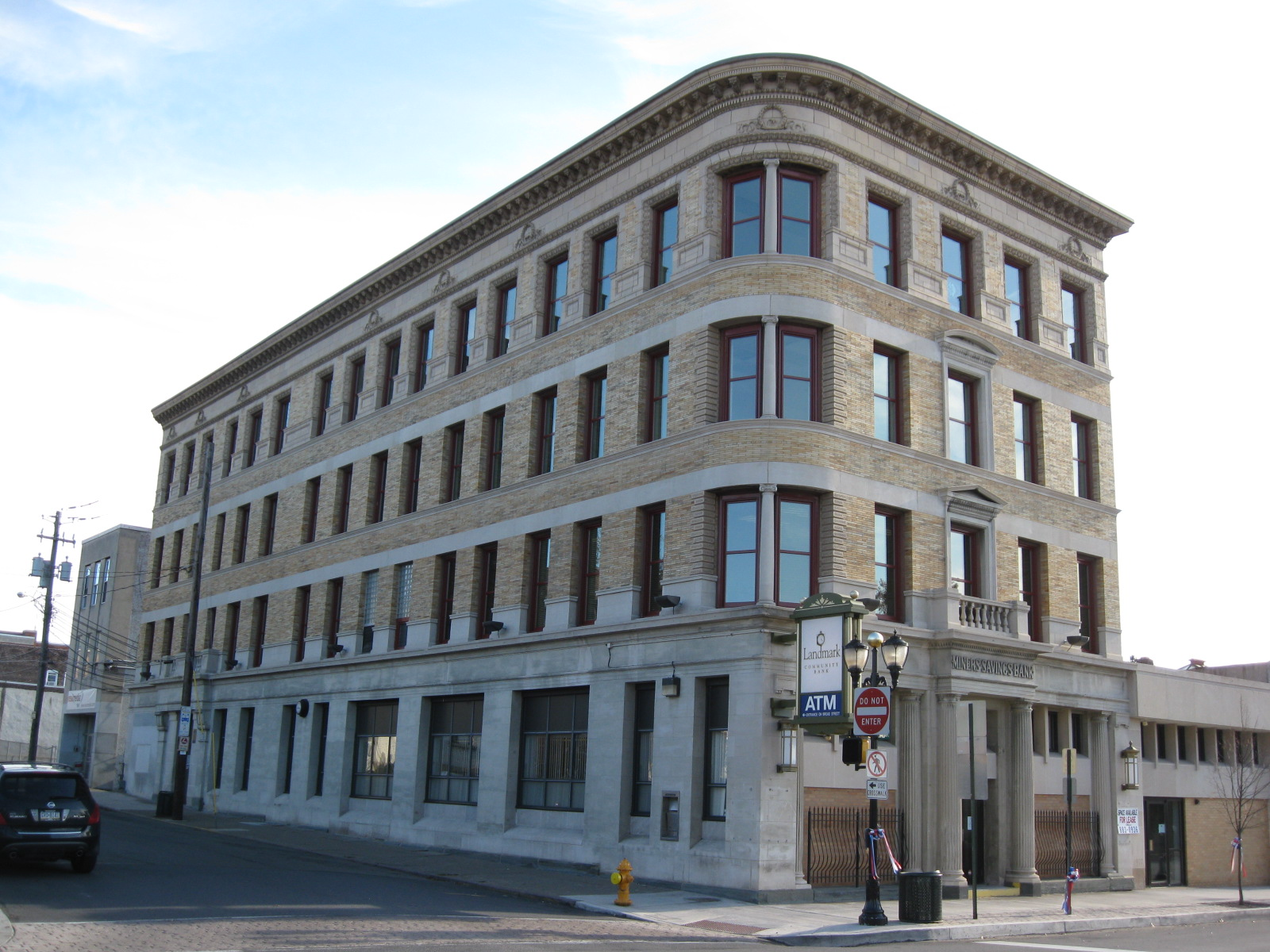
Downtown Pittston

In October 2005, Daniel Siniawa and Associates of Dickson City, Pennsylvania, designed a condo complex for Pittston City, located at Kennedy Boulevard between the Water Street Bridge and East Street. Riverfront Park is located to the west of the development. After a number of years, the condos were constructed and opened to the public.

In December 2009, several buildings along William Street were demolished. These included St. John the Baptist Church and School, St. John the Baptist Catholic Information Library, St. John the Baptist Rectory, the Msgr. Joseph A. Super Athletic Center, and Dave's Billiards. The only building remaining is part of the school where DeMuro's Pizzeria is now located. A memorial green place now sits where the rest of the school once stood. A monument was also built to commemorate both the school and the church, which served the Slovak community for over a century.

In 2008, under the leadership of Mayor Joseph P. Keating, the city invested in renovating the downtown area sidewalks with a brick theme. Colorful brick pavers line the sidewalks along the curbside and at street crossings. Black street lights and sign posts were also placed to enhance the appearance of the downtown. Trees were also planted throughout the central business district. Since 2008, more downtown restoration has occurred. Older buildings are being demolished and newer structures (i.e., condominiums, restaurants, bars, and stores) are being built. Pittston Parks and Recreation Committee proposed an idea in 2015 to paint many of Pittston's fire hydrants; it began in 2016. They were painted by various artistically inclined locals.

== Geography ==
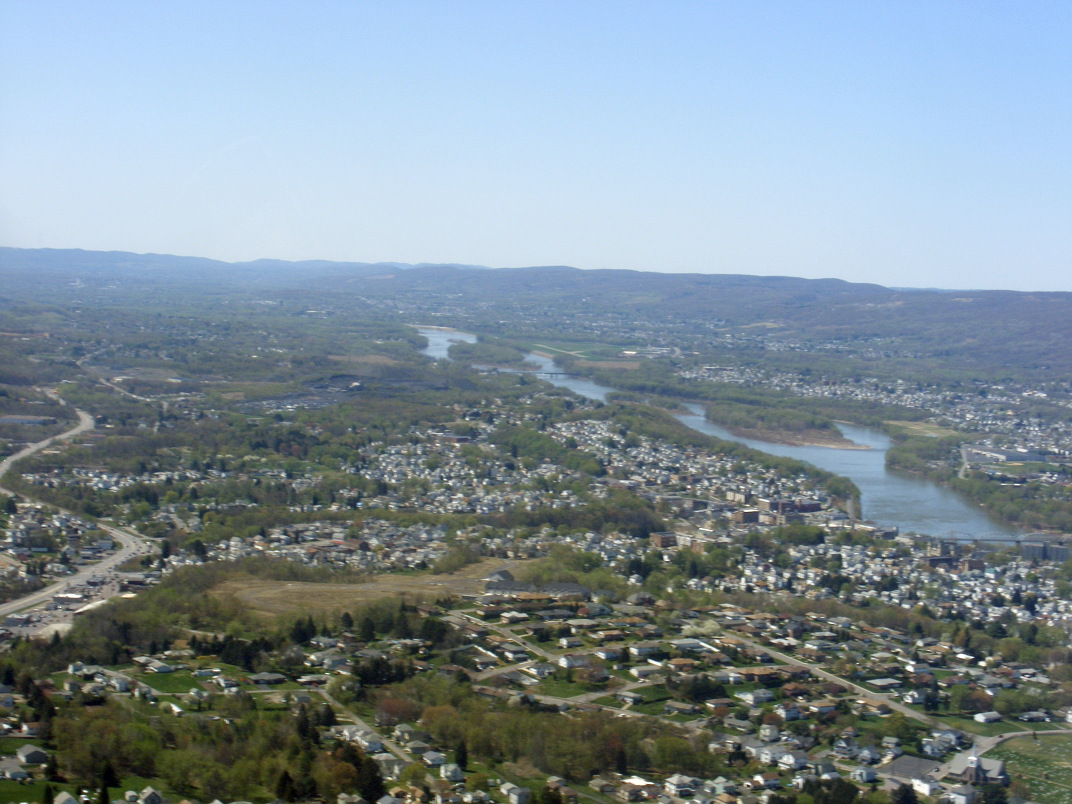
An aerial view of Greater Pittston, including Pittston and the Susquehanna River on the right

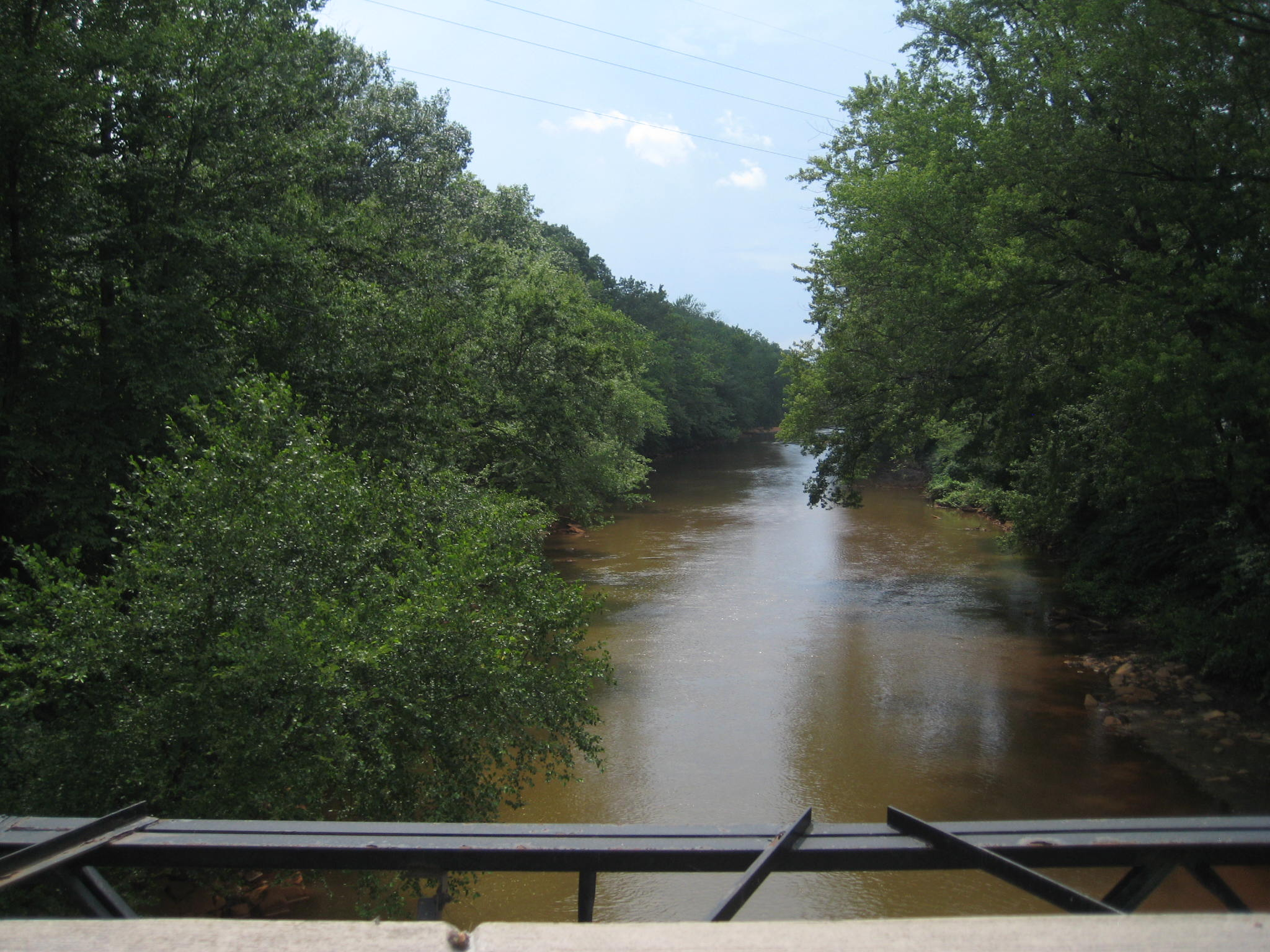
The Lackawanna River from Coxton Road Bridge makes up Pittston's northern border.

Pittston is part of the Wyoming Valley and located on the east side of the Susquehanna River and on the south side of the Lackawanna River. It is approximately midway between Wilkes-Barre and Scranton. According to the United States Census Bureau, the city has a total area of 1.7 square miles (4.4 km^{2}), of which 1.6 square miles (4.1 km^{2}) is land and 0.1 square miles (0.26 km^{2}), or 8.09%, is water.

The city's three sections include the Oregon Section (located in southern Pittston), the Downtown (or City Center), and the Junction (or Upper Pittston). The Oregon Section is a neighborhood located on high ground overlooking the Susquehanna River (in the southern half of the city). The Downtown is located to the north (in the central part of Pittston). U.S. Route 11 passes through this part of the city. Two bridges cross over the Susquehanna and connect the Downtown with the Borough of West Pittston (on the opposite bank). The Downtown is where most of the city's businesses and high-rises exist. The elevation climbs as you move inland (eastward) away from the Susquehanna. The northernmost section of the city is known as the Junction. It is named after the railroad junction (or the Duryea Yard) which runs through its borders. It consists mostly of suburbs built upon several steep hills which overlook both the Susquehanna and Lackawanna Rivers. The Lackawanna River makes up Pittston's northern border.

The area in and around Pittston is referred to as Greater Pittston and includes Avoca, Dupont, Duryea, Exeter, Exeter Township, Hughestown, Jenkins Township, Laflin, Pittston, Pittston Township, West Pittston, West Wyoming, Wyoming, and Yatesville.

Pittston has a hot-summer humid continental climate (Dfa) and average monthly temperatures range from 26.9 °F (−2.8 °C) in January to 72.4 °F (22.4 °C) in July. PRISM Climate Group at Oregon State University The hardiness zone is 6b.

== Demographics ==
Historical population
Census	Pop.	Note	%±
1860	3,682		—
1870	6,760		83.6%
1880	7,472		10.5%
1890	10,302		37.9%
1900	12,556		21.9%
1910	16,267		29.6%
1920	18,497		13.7%
1930	18,246		−1.4%
1940	17,828		−2.3%
1950	15,012		−15.8%
1960	12,407		−17.4%
1970	11,113		−10.4%
1980	9,930		−10.6%
1990	9,400		−5.3%
2000	8,104		−13.8%
2010	7,739		−4.5%
2020	7,591		−1.9%

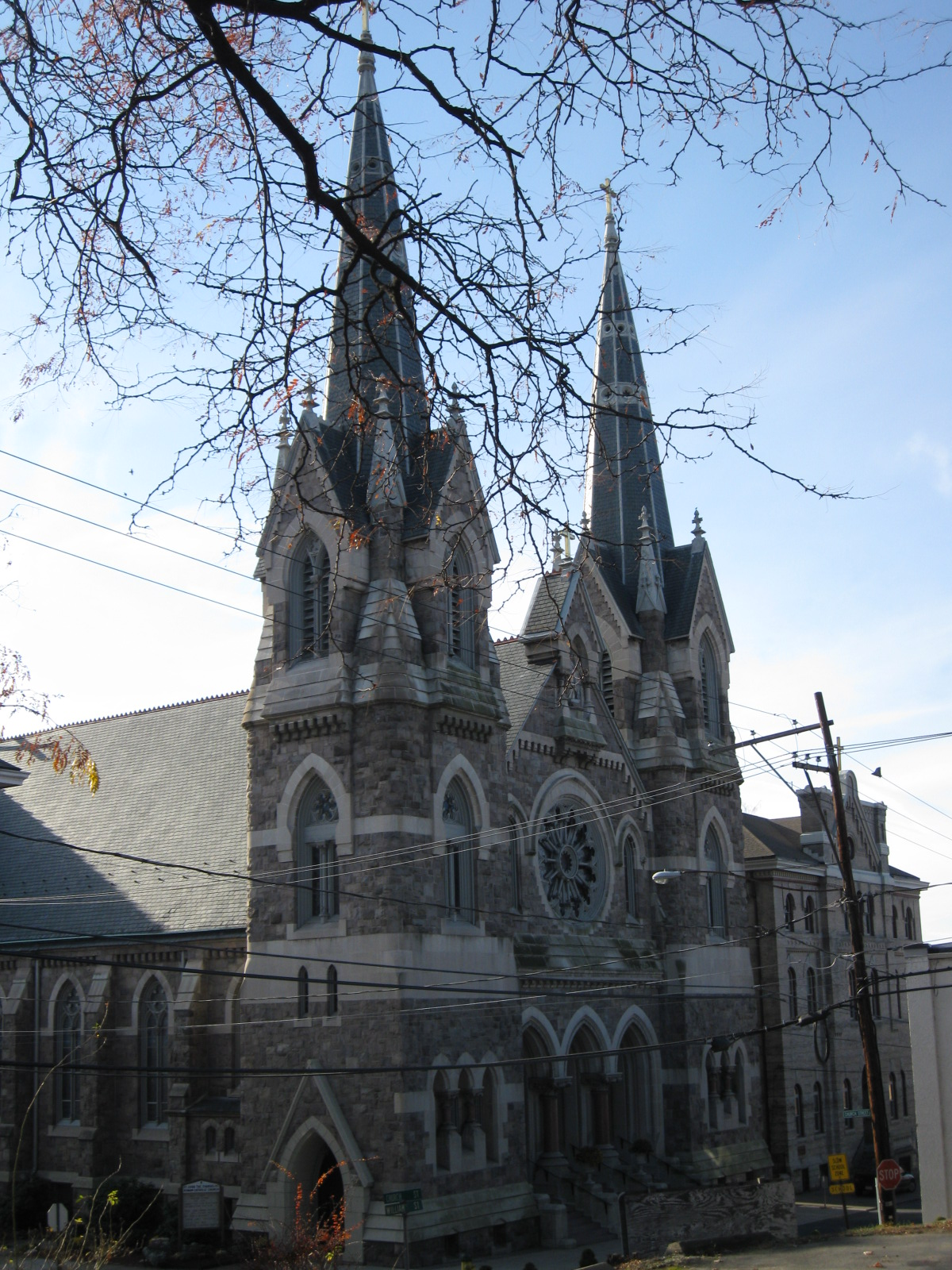
St. John the Evangelist Church

=== 2020 census ===
As of the 2020 census, Pittston had a population of 7,591. The median age was 40.3 years. 20.3% of residents were under the age of 18 and 18.4% of residents were 65 years of age or older. For every 100 females there were 92.5 males, and for every 100 females age 18 and over there were 91.6 males age 18 and over.

100.0% of residents lived in urban areas, while 0.0% lived in rural areas.

There were 3,430 households in Pittston, of which 24.9% had children under the age of 18 living in them. Of all households, 30.5% were married-couple households, 24.4% were households with a male householder and no spouse or partner present, and 34.7% were households with a female householder and no spouse or partner present. About 36.5% of all households were made up of individuals and 15.5% had someone living alone who was 65 years of age or older.

There were 3,903 housing units, of which 12.1% were vacant. The homeowner vacancy rate was 2.7% and the rental vacancy rate was 10.4%.

Racial composition as of the 2020 census
Race	Number	Percent
White	6,493	85.5%
Black or African American	327	4.3%
American Indian and Alaska Native	14	0.2%
Asian	44	0.6%
Native Hawaiian and Other Pacific Islander	2	0.0%
Some other race	198	2.6%
Two or more races	513	6.8%
Hispanic or Latino (of any race)	594	7.8%

=== 2010 census ===
As of the 2010 census, there were 7,739 people, 3,493 households, and 1,992 families residing in the city. The population density was 4,600 people per square mile (1,800/km2). There were 3,907 housing units at an average density of 2,442.4 per square mile (943.0/km^{2}).

The racial makeup of the city was 95% White, 1.9% Black, 0.2% Native American, 0.5% Asian, 0.0% Pacific Islander, 0.7% from other races, and 1.7% from two or more races. Hispanic or Latino of any race were 2.7% of the population.

There were 3,493 households, out of which 26.9% had children under the age of 18 living with them, 33.3% were married couples living together, 16.9% had a female householder with no husband present, 6.8% had a Male householder with no wife present, and 43% were non-families. 36% of all households were made up of individuals, and 32% had someone living alone who was 65 years of age or older. The average household size was 2.20 and the average family size was 2.89.

In the city, the population was spread out, with 23.1% age 19 or under, 6.4% from 20 to 24, 26% from 25 to 44, 26.6% from 45 to 64, and 14.7% who were 65 years of age or older. The median age was 41 years.

=== American Community Survey ===
According to the 2015 census, the top ten ancestries in the city are: Italian (26.6%), Irish (18.9%), Polish (13.6%), German (13.2%), English (10.9%), Slovak (7.2%), Russian (5.3%), Lithuanian (3.4%), Greek (2.3%), and Arab (1.0%).

The median income for a household in the city was $35,918 and the median income for a family was $54,000. The per capita income for the city was $24,304. About 17.8% of individuals are below the poverty line, including 22.2% of those under age 18 and 11.9% of those age 65 or over.

== Arts and culture ==
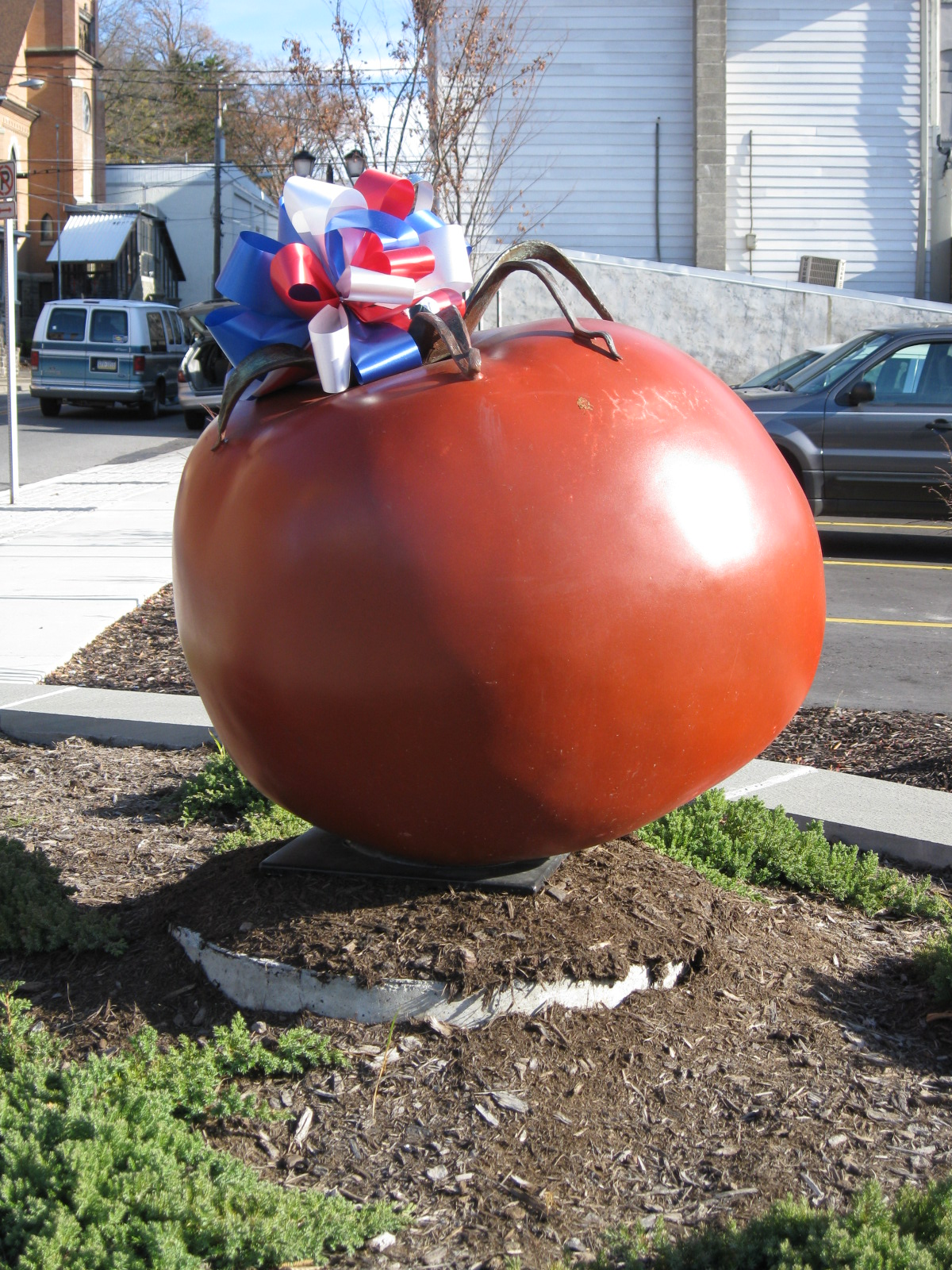
A statue of a tomato in Downtown Pittston

=== Tomato Festival ===
Pittston promotes itself as "The Quality Tomato Capital of the World." Images of tomatoes can be seen throughout Pittston. Street signs bear the image of the tomato. The tomato is also painted on many structures and roadways throughout the city. A statue of a large tomato can be seen on the corner of William and Main in downtown.

Since 1983, The Pittston Tomato Festival has been held annually on South Main Street in Downtown Pittston to celebrate the city's tradition and heritage in cultivating the tomato. Beginning during the first term of Mayor Thomas Walsh, nearly fifty thousand people attend the four-day event every year. Food (from food vendors throughout the Greater Pittston region), a variety of live entertainment, games, rides, arts and crafts, bingo, and home-grown Pittston tomatoes keep bringing an enthusiastic crowd to the festival year after year. The event also consists of a beauty pageant, a tomato tasting contest, a best looking and ugliest tomato contest, a 5 km run through the city, tomato fights, and a parade. In May 2011, Parade Magazine cited the Pittston Tomato Festival in one of its articles.

== Government ==
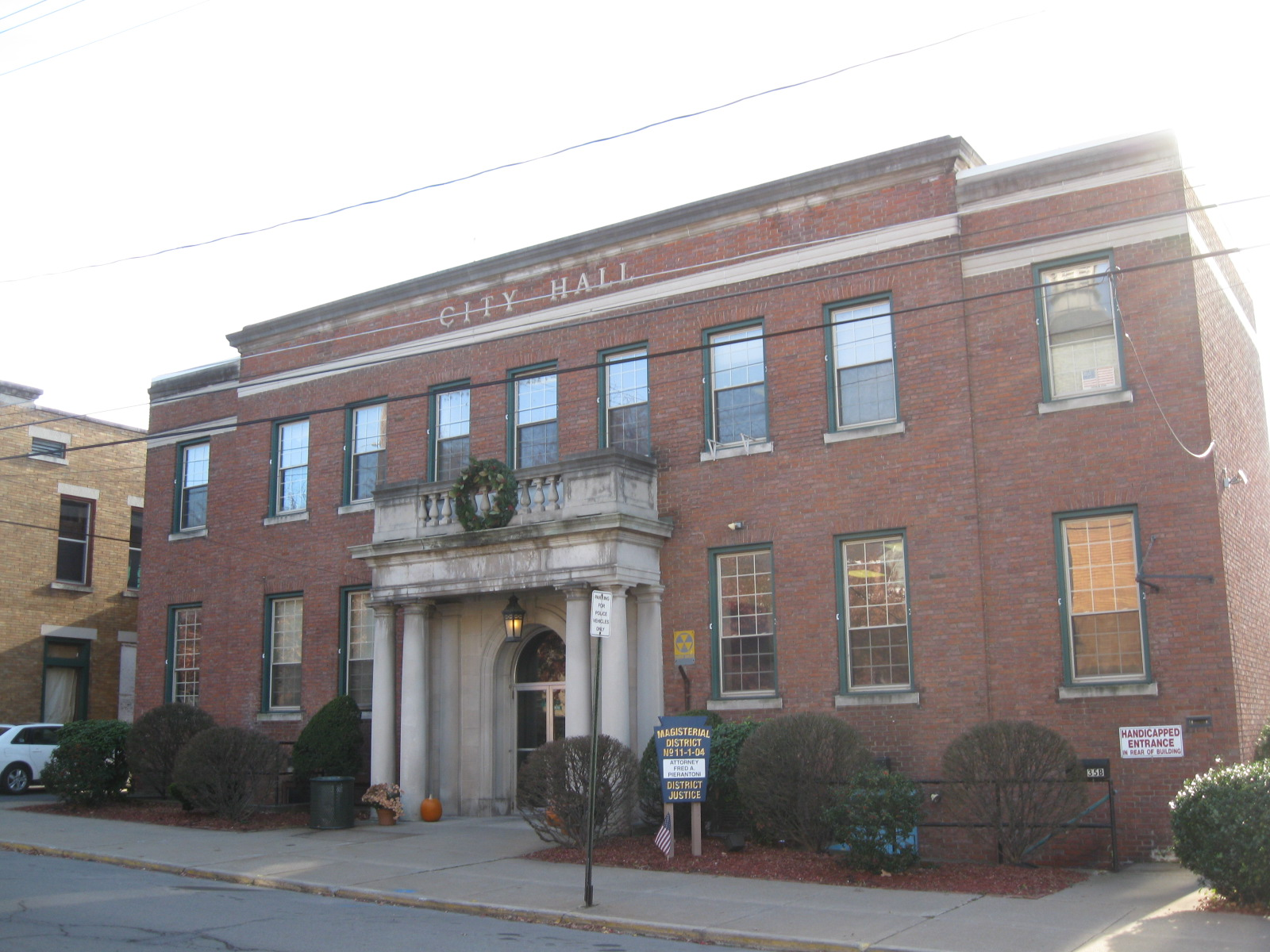
City Hall in Pittston

Pittston was incorporated as a city in December 1894. As defined by the laws of the Commonwealth of Pennsylvania, Pittston operated as a Third Class City as defined by the state's Third Class City Code.

In 2013, however, the electorate authorized Pittston's city government to commence operating under a Home Rule Charter effective January 2, 2013. Under the home rule charter, the city is governed by a five-member city council composed of four elected city councilmembers and the elected mayor, who, in addition to being the presiding officer of the city council, holds additional executive authority as prescribed by the home rule charter. There is also an elected city controller and elected city tax collector/treasurer who hold specific duties as set forth in the home rule charter. A professional city administrator appointed by the city council oversees the day-to-day operations of the city government.

Pittston's City Hall, constructed in 1939, is located at 35 Broad Street near the city's downtown. The building houses the city's three branches of government (legislative, executive, and judicial).

=== Executive ===
The city is headed by an elected mayor.

=== List of mayors ===
Name	Photo	Term of office	Notes
Thomas J. Maloney		1894–1898	First mayor of Pittston City (1894–1898). From 1894 to the present, the City of Pittston is served by an elected mayor (serving four-year terms).
Michael J. Langan		1896*	Acting mayor while Maloney was in Ireland. He was killed in the Twin Shaft Disaster.
Charles Calvin Bowman		1896*	Acting mayor after Michael J. Langan was killed in the Twin Shaft Disaster. He remained acting mayor until Maloney returned from Ireland.
Benjamin Harding		1898–1899	Died in office. Thomas J. Corcoran (councilman of the 7th Ward) was appointed to complete his term.
Thomas J. Corcoran		1899–1904	
James Langan		1904–1907	
William H. Gillespie		1907–1910	
Michael E. Golden		1910–1913	
Michael N. Donnelly		1913–1918	
James J. Kennedy		1918–1922	
P.R. Brown		1922–1926	
William H. Gillespie		1926–1930	
Ambrose Langan		1930–1938	
Kenneth J. English		1938–1942	
John J. Reilly		1942–1946	
Frank T. Horan		1946–1948	
John J. Allardyce		1948–1953	
Joseph F. Saporito		1953–1958	
Patrick J. O'Brien		1958–1962	The Knox Mine Disaster occurred during his term.
Robert A. Loftus		1962–1980	
Thomas A. Walsh		1980–1998	Served 10 years on City Council and 18 years as mayor. The Tomato Festival began during his first term as mayor.
Michael A. Lombardo		1998–2006	Pittston's second youngest mayor.
Joseph P. Keating		2006–2009	Resigned after an unsuccessful race for renomination in 2009.
Donna McFadden-Connors		2009–2010	Served the remainder of Keating's term, and was Pittston's first female mayor.
Jason C. Klush		2010–2018	Pittston's youngest mayor; sworn in at age 33.
Michael A. Lombardo		2018–present	

=== 2017 mayoral election ===
Former Mayor Mike Lombardo easily won the May 2017 Democratic primary. On Tuesday, November 7, 2017, he defeated his only opponent in the general election (Independent Charles Bufalino). The next mayoral election is scheduled for 2021.

Pittston City mayoral general election, 2017
Party	Candidate	Votes	%	±%
Democratic	Mike Lombardo	918	75.25	
Independent	Charles Bufalino	298	24.43	
	Write-in	4	0.33	

== Education ==
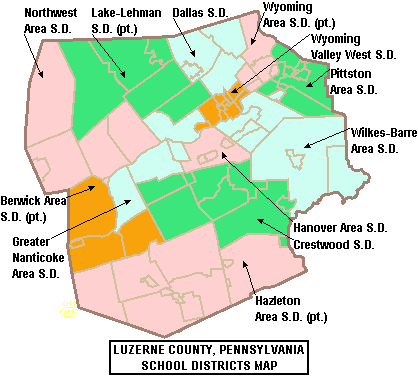
Pittston Area School District, highlighted in green, is located in the northeastern corner of Luzerne County

=== Public ===
Pittston is located within the Pittston Area School District, which covers Pittston Township, Dupont, Duryea, Hughestown, Yatesville, Avoca, and Jenkins Township.

The Pittston Area School District has four schools:

- Pittston Area Primary Center – Hughestown (Grades: K-1)
- Pittston Area Intermediate Center – Pittston (Grades: 2–4)
- Martin L. Mattei Middle School – Pittston (Grades: 5–8)
- Pittston Area Senior High School – Yatesville (Grades: 9–12)

=== Private ===
Schools include:

- Holy Rosary, Duryea

There were several Catholic schools in the Greater Pittston area; many have been closed by the Diocese of Scranton due to lack of funding and low enrollment.

- Seton Catholic High School

== Transportation ==
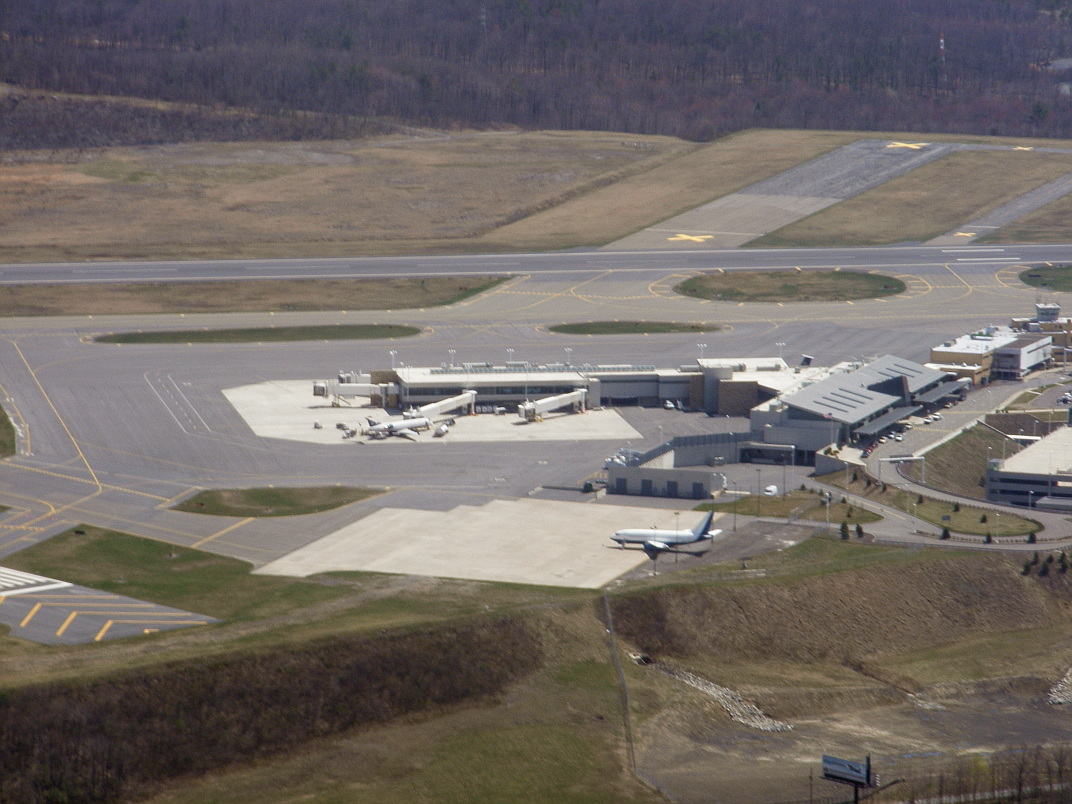
The Wilkes-Barre/Scranton International Airport in Greater Pittston just outside of the city

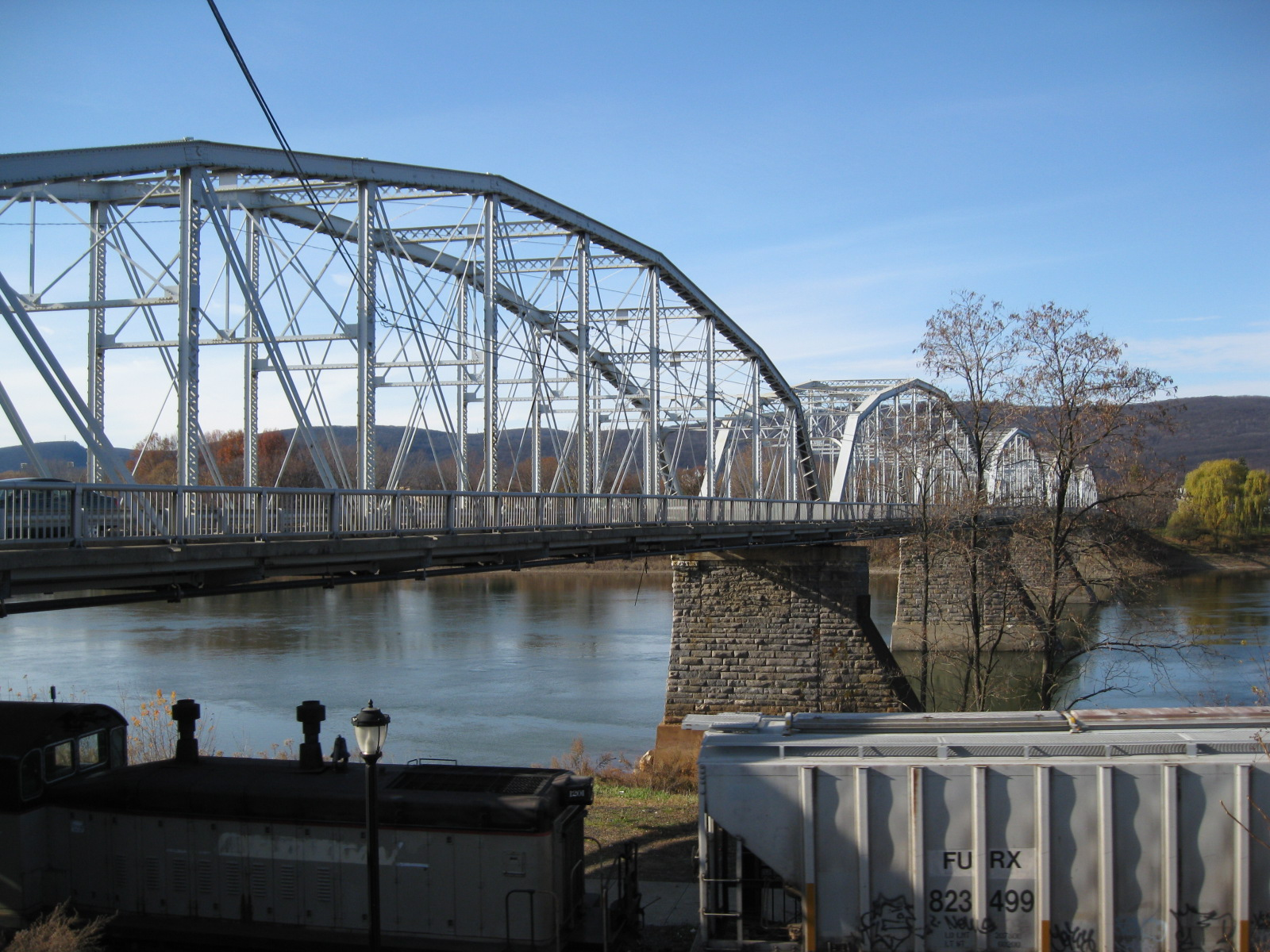
Firefighters' Memorial Bridge in Pittston

=== Highways ===
U.S. Route 11 passes through Pittston City. Interstate 81 passes near Pittston, heading north to Binghamton and south to Harrisburg. Pittston is also located near the Northeast Extension of the Pennsylvania Turnpike, Interstate 476, providing a link to Allentown and Philadelphia.

=== Air ===
The Wilkes-Barre/Scranton International Airport is located in Pittston Township. The airport is served by eight international airlines. On several occasions, it has hosted Air Force One on regional presidential visits to the region. In the spring of 2002, the airport began offering an increased number of non-stop flights across the nation, which are provided by Allegiant, Delta, United, and American.

=== Bus ===
Pittston is served by the Luzerne County Transportation Authority and COLTS, which provides bus services to the city and other communities within Luzerne County and Lackawanna County. Martz Trailways also provides commuter, tour, and trip service from Pittston, and nearby locations in downtown Scranton and Wilkes-Barre to points east and south, including Philadelphia, New York City, and Atlantic City.

=== Rail ===
Reading Blue Mountain and Northern Railroad, Norfolk Southern Railway, and Luzerne & Susquehanna Railroad provide freight service in the city and Pittston Township. A proposed nearby commuter train from Scranton to New York City has received some preliminary government funding. On May 27, 2023, the Reading, Blue Mountain & Northern opened the Wilkes-Barre/Scranton Regional Rail station, which offers passenger service to Jim Thorpe on weekends.

== Public safety ==
Pittston City Fire Headquarters at 20–22 Kennedy Street

=== Firefighting ===
The Pittston City Fire Department provides fire protection for the Greater Pittston region. The department operates from its headquarters at 20–22 Kennedy Street in Pittston. The bureau is staffed by a combination of career and volunteer firefighters. Currently, there are seven full-time firefighters, supplemented by a staff of fifteen part-time firefighters. The Fire Chief is Frank Roman.

=== Police ===
The Pittston City Police Department was established on April 26, 1895; it is headquartered in Pittston City Hall. The city's police provide full-time protection to its citizens, visitors, businesses, and public property. The department also operates a police K-9 unit and specialized detective divisions. The Chief of Police also chairs the city Traffic Committee, which makes recommendations for changes to traffic flow and city parking. The Chief of Police is Neil Murphy.

=== Healthcare ===
Privately run health care clinics are scattered throughout Pittston. Geisinger Health System expanded its operations within the city. A new clinic on Main Street includes urgent care services, and a free health clinic is also located in the city on William Street.

== Notable people ==
- Banana Joe, radio personality
- Blackbear, singer, songwriter, and record producer
- Charles Calvin Bowman, mayor of Pittston and U.S. Representative from Pennsylvania
- James Joseph Brown, mining innovator
- Bill Bufalino, lawyer
- Russell Bufalino, boss of the Bufalino crime family
- Lou Butera, former World Champion pool player and member of the Billiard Congress of America Hall of Fame
- Jimmy Cefalo, Penn State football player, Miami Dolphins wide receiver and radio commentator
- William D'Elia, boss of the Bufalino crime family
- J. Harold Flannery, U.S. Representative from Pennsylvania
- Dan Gordon, animator, director, and cartoonist
- George Gordon, animator and director
- Gerry Granahan, singer, songwriter, and record producer
- James L. Hallock, Wisconsin state legislator
- Mike Hudock, football player
- Hughie Jennings, Hall of fame Major League Baseball player and manager
- Shawn Klush, Elvis tribute artist
- John D. MacArthur, insurance salesman and philanthropist
- Tommy McMillan, baseball outfielder and shortstop
- Thomas Murphy, Victoria Cross recipient
- Ray Musto, U.S. Representative from Pennsylvania
- John H. Newton, U.S. Navy Vice Admiral
- Mark O'Keefe, Montana politician
- Jay Parini, professor and author
- Thomas Tigue, Pennsylvania state legislator
- Charley Trippi, football player
- Faustin E. Wirkus, US Marine Corps Sergeant and King of Gonâve Island
