= Provenzano =

Provenzano is an Italian surname. Notable people with the surname include:

- Anthony Provenzano (1917–1988), New York mobster
- Bernardo Provenzano (1933–2016), member of the Sicilian Mafia
- Carmen Provenzano (1942–2005), Canadian politician
- Chris Provenzano, American film and television writer
- Christian Provenzano, Canadian Ontario politician
- Cláudionor Provenzano (1893–1965), Brazilian rower
- Frankie Provenzano (born 1986), Italian racing driver
- Gabby Provenzano (born 1999), American soccer player
- Giuseppe Provenzano (disambiguation), multiple people
- Jeff Provenzano (born 1976), American skydiver
- Jim Provenzano (born 1961), American author, editor, playwright, photographer
- Joe Palma (born Provenzano, 1905–1994), American actor
- Lawrence C. Provenzano (born 1955), bishop of the Episcopal Diocese of Long Island
- Madeline Provenzano (1936–2014), American politician
- Melissa Provenzano (born 1972), American politician
- Nunzio Provenzano (1923–1997), New York mobster
- Robert Provenzano, American nephrologist
- Thomas Harrison Provenzano (1949–2000), American convicted murderer

== Others ==
- Paulie Provenzano, fictional character, a mutant in the Marvel Universe
