= Thomas Andretta =

American mob associate (1938–2019)

Thomas A. Andretta
- Born: January 1, 1938
- Died: January 25, 2019 (aged 81); Las Vegas, Nevada, U.S.
- Occupation: Business Agent (local 560 Teamsters Union)

Thomas A. Andretta (January 1, 1938 - January 25, 2019) was an associate of the Genovese crime family and suspected to be involved in the disappearance of former Teamster president Jimmy Hoffa.

== Jimmy Hoffa disappearance ==
On July 30, 1975, Jimmy Hoffa was to meet Anthony Provenzano and Anthony Giacalone at 2:00 p.m. at the Machus Red Fox restaurant in Bloomfield Township, a Detroit suburb; he was never seen again. Giacalone and Provenzano, who denied having scheduled a meeting with Hoffa, were found not to have been near the restaurant that afternoon. Provenzano told investigators that he was playing cards with Stephen Andretta, in Union City, New Jersey, on the day Hoffa disappeared. On December 4, 1975, a federal investigator in Detroit said in court presided by James Paul Churchill that a witness had identified three New Jersey men who had participated "in the abduction and murder of James R. Hoffa." The three men, close associates of Provenzano, were Salvatore Briguglio, his brother Gabriel Briguglio, and Thomas Andretta. After years of investigation, involving numerous law enforcement agencies including the FBI, officials have not reached a definitive conclusion as to Hoffa's fate and who was involved.

== Later years ==
In 1979, Thomas and Stephen Andretta were convicted on Racketeer Influenced and Corrupt Organizations Act (RICO) charges for receipt of labor peace payoffs from Seatrain Lines along with Anthony Provenzano. Thomas Andretta was sentenced to 20 years in prison. He spent the last years of his life in Las Vegas, Nevada, and died on January 25, 2019.
