= Hoffa (film) =

1992 film by Danny DeVito

- Theatrical release poster
- Directed by: Danny DeVito
- Written by: David Mamet
- Produced by: Caldecot Chubb Danny DeVito Edward R. Pressman
- Starring: Jack Nicholson; Danny DeVito; Armand Assante; J. T. Walsh; Robert Prosky
- Cinematography: Stephen H. Burum
- Edited by: Ronald Roose Lynzee Klingman
- Music by: David Newman
- Production company: Jersey Films
- Distributed by: 20th Century Fox
- Release date: December 25, 1992
- Running time: 140 minutes
- Country: United States
- Language: English
- Budget: $35 million
- Box office: $29.3 million

Hoffa is a 1992 American biographical crime drama film directed by Danny DeVito and written by David Mamet, based on the life of Teamsters leader Jimmy Hoffa. Most of the story is told in flashbacks before ending with Hoffa's mysterious disappearance. The story makes no claim to be historically accurate and in fact is largely fictional. Jack Nicholson plays Hoffa and DeVito plays Robert Ciaro, an amalgamation of several Hoffa associates over the years. The film features John C. Reilly, Robert Prosky, Kevin Anderson, Armand Assante and J. T. Walsh in supporting roles. The original music score was composed by David Newman. The film was distributed by 20th Century Fox and released on December 25, 1992.

The film received predominantly mixed reviews and grossed just $29 million against its $35 million budget, with critics being polarized over Nicholson's performance and criticizing the film's story.

== Plot ==
On July 30, 1975, Jimmy Hoffa and his longtime friend Bobby Ciaro are impatiently waiting in the parking lot of a roadhouse diner. Moving in vignettes from when he was an International Brotherhood of Teamsters union organizer working the various trucking firms and laundries around Detroit, Hoffa's life over the four preceding decades gradually unfolds.

In 1935, Hoffa boards a parked truck where he meets driver Bobby Ciaro. Hoffa pitches the benefits of joining the Teamsters and gives Ciaro a business card, on which he has written: "Give this man whatever he needs". A few days later, Ciaro reports to work to find Hoffa attempting to persuade his fellow drivers to unionize. Hoffa blurts out that he already spoke to Ciaro, getting him fired. He later accosts Hoffa with a knife but Hoffa's longtime bodyguard Billy Flynn forces him to drop it at gunpoint. Ciaro assists Hoffa and Flynn in the arson of a laundry whose owner refuses to cooperate with the Teamsters. Flynn accidentally sets himself on fire and dies of his injuries. Ciaro then becomes Hoffa's new bodyguard and assistant.

During a Teamsters strike that quickly turns into a street brawl with non-union workers, Hoffa is snatched by men working for Detroit Mafia boss Carl D'Allesandro; the Italian-American Ciaro intercedes and a bargain is struck: D'Allesandro will put his muscle and connections behind the Teamsters in exchange for illegal "loans" from the union's treasury. At a Congressional hearing, Hoffa is questioned by Robert F. Kennedy over allegations that the Teamsters are controlled by organized crime. When Hoffa becomes president of the Teamsters in 1957, Kennedy and Hoffa engage in a loud and bitter feud, especially after John F. Kennedy is elected President in 1960 and Bobby becomes Attorney General.

During a hunting trip, Hoffa and D'Allesandro discuss an embezzlement scheme involving the Teamsters pension fund. Having no paper with them, the plans are sketched on the back of a hunting license. Hoffa is then betrayed by Teamsters official Peter Connelly, who not only testifies at Hoffa's trial for labor racketeering but also provides the prosecution with a crucial piece of evidence: the license. Hoffa surrenders to federal officials and receives a long sentence while Connelly's uncle, Frank Fitzsimmons, assumes control of the Teamsters. Ciaro is also convicted but on lesser charges and quickly obtains early release from prison. D'Allesandro advises him to have the Teamsters endorse Richard M. Nixon for president in 1968 in exchange for Hoffa receiving a presidential pardon.

Hoffa is pardoned by the Nixon administration but learns that, because of a deal struck between the White House and Fitzsimmons, he is forbidden to have any contact with the Teamsters for ten years. Hoffa becomes furious and meets with D'Allesandro, asking him to have Fitzsimmons killed, resulting in a failed attempt to assassinate him with a car bomb. D'Allesandro believes that Hoffa has become "too hot" with his public antics and declines to help him any further. In response, Hoffa has Ciaro deliver a message to D'Allesandro that unless Fitzsimmons is dealt with, Hoffa will go to the press. D'Allesandro replies that he will meet with Hoffa at a nearby diner the next day to work out a plan.

Hoffa and Ciaro spend several hours waiting in the diner's parking lot but D'Allesandro fails to show up. A union driver has been waiting for hours in the dining room, claiming mechanical problems with his truck. He and Ciaro start talking, and Ciaro lets him take some coffee to Hoffa, who is waiting in the car. The "driver" pulls out a silenced pistol and kills Hoffa and Ciaro. He is immediately driven off in a car that pulls up; at the same time, men emerge from the truck, toss Ciaro's body in Hoffa's car, drive it inside and leave.

== Cast ==
- Jack Nicholson as Jimmy Hoffa
- Danny DeVito as Bobby Ciaro
- Armand Assante as Carl "Dally" D'Allesandro (based on Anthony Giacalone and Anthony Provenzano)
- J.T. Walsh as Frank Fitzsimmons
- John C. Reilly as Petey Connelly
- Kevin Anderson as Robert F. Kennedy
- John P. Ryan as "Red" Bennett
- Frank Whaley as Young Trucker In Diner
- Natalia Nogulich as Josephine "Jo" Hoffa
- Nicholas Pryor as Hoffa's Attorney (based on Bill Bufalino)
- Robert Prosky as Billy Flynn
- Paul Guilfoyle as Ted Harmon
- Karen Young as Young Woman at RTA
- Cliff Gorman as Soloman "Solly" Stein
- Peter Spellos as Man in Crowd
- Bruno Kirby as Nightclub Comedian (uncredited)
- Jon Favreau as Extra (uncredited)
- Tim Burton as Corpse (uncredited)

== Production ==
In 1982, George Barrie hired Robin Moore to write a screenplay for a biopic called The Jimmy Hoffa Story for GB Pictures International, with Jimmy Hoffa's attorney Frank Ragano serving as a script consultant. The screenplay was later retitled Hoffa and filming was originally projected to commence in the spring of 1984 but no progress occurred. In 1989 Joe Isgro, Edward R. Pressman, and Chaldecot Chubb purchased the rights to Moore's screenplay and hired David Mamet to rewrite it for $1 million. Pressman considered Barry Levinson, Oliver Stone and John McTiernan to direct the film. Levinson was the frontrunner but chose to decline after Mamet refused to make script changes. Pressman hired Danny DeVito to direct in April 1990. Jack Nicholson was hired to play Hoffa after Kevin Spacey, Al Pacino and Robert De Niro also auditioned. Pacino and De Niro subsequently co-starred in the 2019 Martin Scorsese film The Irishman, with the former playing Hoffa. DeVito secured a $50 million budget for the film by forgoing his salary and signing as co-guarantor for the film. Production was originally set to begin in Washington, D.C. in January 1992 but was delayed because of Nicholson and DeVito's commitments to A Few Good Men and Batman Returns, respectively. It would ultimately last between February and June 1992 in Pittsburgh, Detroit, Chicago and soundstages in Los Angeles. Carnegie Mellon University, Gateway Center (Pittsburgh), Cobo Arena, the Detroit Produce Terminal, the Detroit Public Library, the Detroit News staff room, the Ambassador Hotel and the Spiegel Office Building were used as shooting locations.

The film sparked controversy before its release, when DeVito made a statement that he saw Hoffa as a hero. The film was made without the Hoffa's family permission. Hoffa's son, James P. Hoffa, despite praising the film for its heroic portrayal of his father, was critical of his portrayal as "an angry bear." The film's portrayal of Hoffa's disappearance bears little resemblance to the actual events of July 30, 1975. Rather than traveling to an isolated diner with a bodyguard as shown in the movie, Hoffa's last known sighting was at the Machus Red Fox, an upscale restaurant next to a shopping center in the affluent Detroit, Michigan suburb of Bloomfield Hills, where he had arranged a meeting with Tony Provenzano and Tony Giacalone. The location of the murder is unknown but any violence in the parking lot would have attracted attention from potential witnesses and left evidence that could have been used by police. Hoffa's car was also found abandoned at the restaurant after his disappearance.

== Reception ==
=== Box office ===
The film premiered at the Samuel Goldwyn Theater in Beverly Hills on December 11, 1992. It received a wider release on Christmas Day 1992, in 1,066 theaters. It debuted at no. 5 at the US box office. making $6.4 million in its opening weekend. In its second weekend, it dropped at #6 and grossed $4.8 million. It went on to gross $24.2 million in the U.S. and $5 million internationally, for a worldwide total of $29.3 million. Jack Nicholson blamed the film's poor performance on Columbia Pictures' decision to move his other film A Few Good Men to the same release date.

=== Critical response ===
The film received mixed reviews, with criticism being directed at for historical inaccuracies and its depiction of Hoffa in a heroic, even sympathetic light. Sean Wilentz, writing in The New Republic, accused the film of having been conceived, originated and outlined by organized crime figures. On Rotten Tomatoes, the film holds an approval rating of 52% based on 25 reviews, with an average rating of 5.46/10. The website's critical consensus reads, "Jack Nicholson embodies Hoffa with malevolent relish, but a dearth of meaningful insight knocks this crime epic off the mark by a nose." On Metacritic, the film has a weighted average score of 50 out of 100, based on 15 critics, indicating "mixed or average" reviews. Audiences polled by CinemaScore gave the film an average grade of "B" on an A+ to F scale.

Roger Ebert gave the film 3.5/4 stars and wrote, "Here is a movie that finds the right look and tone for its material. Not many directors would have been confident enough to simply show us Jimmy Hoffa instead of telling us all about him. This is a movie that makes its points between the lines, in what is not said. It's not so much about what happened to Jimmy Hoffa, as about the fact that something eventually would." Peter Travers of Rolling Stone also gave the film 3.5/4 stars and said, "In the more ambitious Hoffa, Nicholson plays the Detroit street fighter who rose from the ranks of trucker and labor organizer to build the Teamsters into the nation's most powerful union. The boldness of director Danny DeVito's violent epic is matched by Nicholson's astonishing physical and vocal transformation into Jimmy Hoffa. The changeover might constrict another actor. Not Nicholson." Vincent Canby of The New York Times wrote: "Hoffa is an original work of fiction, based on fact, conceived with imagination and a consistent point of view." Canby notes that the film has "a bitterly skeptical edge that is rare in American movies. It forces viewers to make up their own minds, something that can be immensely disorienting as well as rewarding." Kenneth Turan of the Los Angeles Times wrote: "It is a laconic, enigmatic piece of work, displaying the grace with spoken language that marked Glengarry Glen Ross but troublesome in terms of structure and character development."

Alex von Tunzelmann of The Guardian gave the film a grade of C−, saying: "The film attempts a cautious middle route between celebrating Hoffa as a working-class hero and condemning him as a gangster. But despite a watchable performance from Nicholson, after more than two hours of screentime, Jimmy Hoffa remains an enigma." David Thomson states that the film was terribly neglected, since Nicholson portrayed one of his best screen characters, someone who is "snarly, dumb, smart, noble, rascally—all the parts of 'Jack'".

=== Accolades ===
Hoffa earned two Academy Award nominations for Best Cinematography and Best Makeup, losing to A River Runs Through It and Bram Stoker's Dracula, respectively at the 65th Academy Awards. Nicholson's performance sharply divided critics, with the actor receiving nominations for both the Golden Globe Award for Best Actor in a Motion Picture – Drama at the 50th Golden Globes and the Golden Raspberry Award for Worst Actor (for this film and his performance in Man Trouble) at the 13th Golden Raspberry Awards. DeVito was also nominated for the Golden Raspberry Award for Worst Director. The film was also nominated for the Golden Bear at the 43rd Berlin International Film Festival.

The film is recognized by American Film Institute in these lists:

- 2005: AFI's 100 Years of Film Scores – Nominated

== See also ==
- Robert F. Kennedy in media
