= Salvatore Briguglio =

American gangster (1930–1978)

- Born: February 4, 1930; Union City, New Jersey. U.S.
- Died: March 21, 1978 (aged 48); New York City, New York, U.S.
- Cause of death: Murder by gunshot wounds
- Resting place: George Washington Memorial Park, Paramus, New Jersey, U.S.
- Other name: Sally Bugs
- Occupation: Mobster
- Known for: Suspected involvement in the disappearance of Jimmy Hoffa
- Spouse: Mildred Pantoliano (m. 1954)
- Children: 2
- Allegiance: Genovese crime family

Salvatore "Sally Bugs" Briguglio (February 4, 1930 – March 21, 1978) was an American mobster and hitman for the New Jersey faction of the Genovese crime family, and business agent for Local 560 of the Teamsters. He is known for being one of the prime suspects in the disappearance of Teamsters president Jimmy Hoffa. Briguglio was also known for being a ruthless killer; he is reported to have killed over 50 people for the Genovese crime family, in some cases torturing his victims.

== Early life ==
Briguglio was born on February 4, 1930, at 406 Palisade Avenue in Union City, New Jersey. Briguglio served with the U.S. Army during the Korean War.

== Criminal career ==
Briguglio was a loanshark and hitman who served as a lieutenant to Anthony Provenzano. He allegedly killed over 50 people for the Genovese crime family. Briguglio allegedly tortured and murdered Anthony Castellitto on the orders of Provenzano, due to Castellitto having received more votes than him in a union election. Briguglio transported the body of Castellitto back to New Jersey and dismembered it in a woodchipper. In June 1976, Briguglio was indicted, along with Provenzano and another murder associate in the Castellitto murder.

=== Jimmy Hoffa disappearance ===
Briguglio is one of the top suspects in the disappearance of Jimmy Hoffa. Some experts think that Briguglio murdered Hoffa. One FBI theory indicates that Briguglio was one of the men who Hoffa met the day he vanished under the pretense that Hoffa was going to resolve his feud with Provenzano. A statement from FBI informant Ralph Picardo said that he was a driver for Provenzano, and that Hoffa was invited to a sit-down with the Provenzano crew which he was told was to be mediated by Detroit crime family acting boss Anthony Giacalone. Chuckie O'Brien picked up Hoffa at a restaurant and drove him to a nearby house for the sit-down. Instead, however, Genovese crime family New Jersey faction wiseguys Thomas Andretta, Sal Briguglio, and his brother Gabriel Briguglio were waiting at the house with orders to kill Hoffa. Picardo also stated that Frank Sheeran was also present. Briguglio, and everyone accused, were the prime suspects for Hoffa's disappearance.

== Death ==
On March 21, 1978, two gunmen knocked Briguglio down and shot him four times in the face and chest as he lay sprawled on the sidewalk in front of the Andrea Doria Social Club in Little Italy, Manhattan. Witnesses say that the two gunmen ran north and got into a light blue Mercury with New Jersey license plates and drove off.

== In popular culture ==
He is portrayed by Louis Cancelmi in the 2019 film The Irishman.
