= Nunzia =

Nunzia is a female Italian given name. Notable people with the name include:

- Nunzia Agata Pometti (born 1955), Italian actress
- Nunzia Catalfo (born 1967), Italian politician
- Nunzia De Girolamo (born 1975), Italian lawyer and politician

== See also ==
- Nunzio, male equivalent
