= Charles O'Brien (unionist) =

American Teamsters organizer (1933–2020)

Charles "Chuckie" O'Brien (December 20, 1933 – February 13, 2020) was an American labor union organizer. He was closely linked to International Brotherhood of Teamsters President Jimmy Hoffa, and referred to himself as Hoffa's stepson. FBI investigators described him as a "habitual liar." O'Brien was born in Kansas City, Missouri. He was the son of Charles Lenton O'Brien and Sylvia Pagano. O'Brien's father died when he was still an infant. In 1957, he became special assistant to Hoffa, and remained extremely loyal to him over the years. Hoffa was convicted for jury tampering in 1964, and his conviction was upheld by the Supreme Court. While in court, Hoffa was shot by an assailant carrying a BB gun; O'Brien attacked the man, leaving him bloodied. In 1966, after Hoffa had been sent to prison, Frank Fitzsimmons took over the Teamsters as temporary president. Before Hoffa's disappearance, Fitzsimmons "exiled" O'Brien to Alaska, although he spent just four days there.

On the day of Hoffa's disappearance, O'Brien was seen driving a car belonging to Anthony Giacalone's son. O'Brien was close to Giacalone, and referred to him as "Uncle Tony." In August 1975, O'Brien was questioned by federal agents about Hoffa's disappearance. By 1978, O'Brien was working as an official with Teamsters Local 299 in Detroit.

In 1995, the FBI stated that they did not consider O'Brien to be a suspect in the disappearance of Hoffa, and provided him with a letter asking him for his cooperation with the investigation. In 2001, O'Brien was asked to take a polygraph during an investigation into the disappearance of Hoffa, but refused. Later that year, using DNA testing, the FBI linked strands of human hair found in the car driven by O'Brien to Hoffa. O'Brien died of an apparent heart attack in 2020.

== Personal life ==
O'Brien was the stepfather of Harvard Law School professor Jack Goldsmith. O'Brien and Goldsmith's mother divorced in 1987.

== In film ==
O'Brien is portrayed by Jesse Plemons in the 2019 film The Irishman, which was directed by Martin Scorsese. Chuckie O'Brien and Jack Goldsmith both criticized the portrayal of O'Brien in the film, with Goldsmith calling it "high fiction."
