= Maurice Edelbaum =

American lawyer

Maurice Edelbaum (1906–1984) was an American criminal lawyer from New York.

Edelbaum was born in Brooklyn, New York. He was educated in New York City public schools before graduating from Fordham University School of Law in 1928. In 1957, he represented Vincent Gigante in his trial for shooting Frank Costello to help Vito Genovese usurp the top position in Luciano Crime Family. In 1967, Edelbaum served as a lawyer for Stephen H. Kessler, a former medical student who was found not guilty by reason of insanity after being charged with murdering his mother-in-law. The same year, Edelbaum also was a lawyer for John (Sonny) Franzese, a bank robber in the Colombo crime family. Two years later, Edelbaum defended a Tammany Hall leader, Carmine De Sapio. Despite his attempt to prove his innocence, De Sapio was found guilty of conspiracy to bribe a water commissioner and extort contracts from Consolidated Edison. His sentence was set to two years in prison. Edelbaum was also notorious for his defense of Anthony Provenzano. Edelbaum died on August 10, 1984, in Washington Manor Nursing Home in Hollywood, Florida.
