= Nunzio (disambiguation) =

Nunzio may refer to:

- A masculine Italian name.
- Nunzio (wrestler) (born 1972), his real name is James Maritato.

== People ==
Other people with the name include:

- Gregory Corso, AKA Gregory Nunzio Corso (1930–2001), a Beat poet
- Nunzio DeFilippis, American writer of comic books and television
- Nick Discepola (born 1949), Italian-born Canadian politician whose given name is Nunzio
- Nunzio Ferraiuoli (1661–1735), Italian painter of the Baroque period
- Nunzio Gallo (1928–2008), Italian singer and actor
- Joseph Nunzio Latino (1937–2021), Roman Catholic Bishop of Jackson (Mississippi, US, 2003–2013)
- Nunzio Provenzano (1923–1997), Genovese crime family soldier

== Fiction ==
- Nunzio, a character in the Myth Adventures series created by Robert Asprin
- Sacred Silence, an Italian film originally titled Pianese Nunzio, 14 anni a maggio
- Nunzio (film), a 1978 American film starring David Proval
