= Stephen H. Kessler =

- Born: Stephen H. Kessler; 1935 (age 90–91)
- Motive: Insanity
- Conviction: Not guilty by reason of insanity
- Criminal charges: Murder
- Penalty: Committed

Stephen H. Kessler (born 1935) is a person who was known as the "LSD Killer".

== Education ==
He attended Harvard College and graduated class of '57, and was enrolled in Downstate Medical School in 1964, but was asked to leave because of his unstable behaviour.

== Trial ==
He was arrested in April 1966 and tried for murder in October, having apparently stabbed his mother-in-law 105 times. Headlines trumpeted him as a "Mad LSD Slayer" and "LSD Killer", based on a statement made during his arrest that he had been "flying for three days on LSD". Kessler testified at trial that he had taken LSD a month prior to the murder, but a psychiatrist later testified that Kessler told him he took LSD on the day of the murder. His drug use was revealed as having been "one-and-a-half grains of phenobarbital" and "three quarts of lab alcohol".

Psychiatrists testified that he had paranoid schizophrenia and he was found not guilty by reason of insanity.

== See also ==
- Maurice Edelbaum, one of Kessler's lawyers
