= Barbara Ann Crancer =

American lawyer and judge (born 1938)

Associate Circuit Judge of the 21st Missouri Circuit Court
- In office July 1992 – March 2008

Personal details
- Born: Barbara Ann Hoffa; April 8, 1938 (age 88) Detroit, Michigan, U.S.
- Spouse: Robert E. Crancer (m. 1961; died 2023)
- Children: 1
- Parent: Jimmy Hoffa (father)
- Relatives: James P. Hoffa (brother)
- Education: Albion College (BA); Washington University in St. Louis (JD)

Barbara Ann Crancer (née Hoffa; born April 8, 1938) is an American retired lawyer and judge who was a St. Louis County, Missouri Associate Circuit Court Judge. She is the daughter of former Teamsters Union president Jimmy Hoffa and Josephine (née Poszywak) Hoffa.

== Early life and education ==
Crancer was born in Detroit, Michigan. She earned a Bachelor of Arts degree from Albion College in 1960, and a Juris Doctor degree from the Washington University School of Law. After her father's disappearance, Crancer claimed that she had a vision of her father, who, she was already sure, was dead. He was slumped over and wore a dark-colored, short-sleeved polo shirt. It has mystified her ever since that although she could not have possibly known that prior to her arrival at Lake Orion, the clothing in her vision was exactly what Hoffa was wearing when he disappeared.

== Career ==
Crancer worked as a private practice lawyer in St. Louis through 1989 when she was appointed legal advisor and then administrative law judge for Missouri Division of Workers' Compensation, serving until 1992. In July 1992, Crancer was appointed to associate circuit judge for St. Louis County, Missouri. Crancer retired in March 2008, but in March 2009, she agreed to serve as an assistant attorney general for the Division of Civil Disability and Workers Rights. She retired from that post in March 2011.

== Personal life ==
Crancer was married to Robert E. Crancer (b. November 17, 1936) from 1961 until his death in 2023. They have one daughter, Barbara Josephine Crancer (b. 1963) and one grandson.

Her younger brother is James P. Hoffa, former president of the Teamsters Union. While the siblings grew up in Detroit, the Hoffa family also spent time at their summer cottage in Orion Township, Michigan. Crancer is portrayed by Rebecca Faulkenberry in Martin Scorsese's The Irishman (2019).
