= The Irishman =

2019 film by Martin Scorsese

- Release poster
- Directed by: Martin Scorsese
- Screenplay by: Steven Zaillian
- Based on: I Heard You Paint Houses by Charles Brandt
- Produced by: Martin Scorsese; Robert De Niro; Jane Rosenthal; Emma Tillinger Koskoff; Irwin Winkler; Gerald Chamales; Gastón Pavlovich; Randall Emmett; Gabriele Israilovici
- Starring: Robert De Niro; Al Pacino; Joe Pesci; Ray Romano; Bobby Cannavale; Anna Paquin; Stephen Graham; Harvey Keitel
- Cinematography: Rodrigo Prieto
- Edited by: Thelma Schoonmaker
- Music by: Robbie Robertson
- Production companies: Tribeca Productions; Sikelia Productions; Winkler Films
- Distributed by: Netflix
- Release dates: September 27, 2019 (NYFF); November 1, 2019 (United States); November 27, 2019 (Netflix)
- Running time: 209 minutes
- Country: United States
- Language: English
- Budget: $159–250 million
- Box office: $8 million

The Irishman (also known as I Heard You Paint Houses) is a 2019 American epic crime film directed and produced by Martin Scorsese from a screenplay by Steven Zaillian, based on the 2004 book I Heard You Paint Houses by Charles Brandt. It stars Robert De Niro, Al Pacino, and Joe Pesci, with Ray Romano, Bobby Cannavale, Anna Paquin, Stephen Graham, and Harvey Keitel in supporting roles. The biographical film follows Frank Sheeran (De Niro), a truck driver who becomes a hitman involved with mobster Russell Bufalino (Pesci) and his crime family before later working for Jimmy Hoffa (Pacino), a powerful Teamster. The film marked the ninth collaboration between Scorsese and De Niro, in addition to Scorsese's fourth collaboration with Pesci; his first with Pacino; and the first collaboration between Pesci and Pacino altogether.

In September 2014, following years of development hell, The Irishman was announced as Scorsese's next film after Silence (2016). De Niro, who also served as producer, and Pacino were confirmed that month, as was Pesci, who came out of his unofficial retirement to star after numerous requests. Principal photography began in September 2017 in and around New York City and wrapped in March 2018. Scenes were filmed with a custom three-camera rig to help facilitate the extensive de-ageing digital effects that made De Niro, Pacino, and Pesci appear younger. With a runtime of 209 minutes, it is the longest film of Scorsese's career.

The Irishman premiered at the 57th New York Film Festival, and had a limited theatrical release on November 1, 2019, followed by a streaming release on November 27, 2019, by Netflix. The film received widespread critical acclaim, with praise for Scorsese's direction, the production and costume design, editing, screenplay, cinematography, and the performances of De Niro, Pacino and Pesci. It was named the Best Film of 2019 by the National Board of Review and one of the top ten films of the year by American Film Institute. The film was nominated for ten categories at the 92nd Academy Awards, including Best Picture, and received numerous other accolades.

== Plot ==
In a nursing home, elderly Irish American World War II veteran Frank Sheeran narrates his time as a hitman for the Italian-American Mafia.

In 1950s Philadelphia, Sheeran works as a union delivery truck driver, where he starts selling some of the meat shipments to a local Philadelphia Italian American gangster known as "Skinny Razor," a member of the Philadelphia crime family headed by Angelo Bruno. After the delivery company accuses Sheeran of theft, union lawyer Bill Bufalino gets the case dismissed when Sheeran refuses to name his customers to the judge.

Bill introduces Sheeran to his cousin Russell Bufalino, head of his namesake crime family in Northeastern Pennsylvania. Sheeran begins to carry out jobs for him, as well as members of the South Philadelphia underworld, including "painting houses," a euphemism for contract killing.

Sheeran is soon introduced to Jimmy Hoffa, head of the International Brotherhood of Teamsters, who has financial ties with the Northeastern Pennsylvania crime family. He is struggling to deal with fellow rising Teamster Anthony "Tony Pro" Provenzano, in addition to mounting pressure from the federal government. Hoffa becomes close with Sheeran and his family, especially his daughter Peggy; in turn Sheeran becomes his chief bodyguard.

After the 1960 election of John F. Kennedy, Bufalino is thrilled while Hoffa is furious. Kennedy's brother, Robert F. Kennedy, whom he appointed Attorney General, forms a "Get Hoffa" squad to bring down Hoffa, who is eventually arrested and convicted in 1964 for jury tampering.

While Hoffa is in prison, his replacement as Teamsters president, Frank "Fitz" Fitzsimmons, misuses the union's pension fund and gives interest-free loans to the Mafia. Hoffa's relationship with Tony Pro, himself arrested for extortion, also deteriorates beyond repair when Hoffa refuses to help restore his forfeited pension. Hoffa's sentence is commuted by President Richard Nixon in 1971, although he is forbidden from partaking in any Teamsters activities until 1980.

Despite his parole terms, Hoffa undertakes a plan to reclaim his power atop the Teamsters. His growing disrespect for other Teamster leaders and his intention to separate the union from the Mafia begin to worry Russell. During a dinner in Sheeran's honor in October 1973, Russell pleads with Sheeran to confront Hoffa and warn him that the heads of the crime families are displeased with his behavior. Hoffa then informs Sheeran that he "knows things" that Russell and the dons of other families are unaware of and claims that what he knows makes him untouchable, for if anything ever happened to him, they would all end up in prison.

In 1975, while on their way to the wedding of Bill's daughter, Russell reluctantly informs Sheeran that the dons have become fed up with Hoffa and have sanctioned his murder. Russell further informs Sheeran that he must serve as the triggerman, knowing he might otherwise try to warn or save Hoffa. The two drive to a private airport where Sheeran boards a plane to Detroit.

Hoffa, who had scheduled a meeting at a local restaurant with Tony Pro and Anthony Giacalone, is surprised to see Sheeran arriving late, with Hoffa's unsuspecting foster son Chuckie O'Brien and loan shark Sally Bugs. They tell Hoffa the meeting was moved to a house where Tony Pro and Russell are waiting, so Sheeran is to drive him over there. Entering the house, Hoffa realizes it is empty and that he has been set up. He turns around to leave, at which point Sheeran shoots him dead at point-blank range and leaves the gun on his body by the entrance. After Sheeran departs, two other mobsters wrap up the body and cremate it in secret.

Invoking their Fifth Amendment rights in a grand jury investigation into Hoffa's disappearance, Sheeran, Russell, Tony Pro, and others are eventually convicted and incarcerated on various charges unrelated to Hoffa's murder.

Sheeran is eventually released and placed in a nursing home following his worsening health and his wife's death. He tries to reconcile with his alienated daughters in his final years. Peggy, however, suspecting his involvement in Hoffa's disappearance, has since severed all contact with him. Sheeran begins seeing a Catholic priest assigned to the nursing home, who assures him an overall absolution for whatever crimes committed or denied over his lifetime. As the priest leaves, Sheeran asks him to leave the door slightly ajar, emulating one of Hoffa's safety habits.

== Cast ==
- Robert De Niro as Frank Sheeran
- Al Pacino as Jimmy Hoffa
- Joe Pesci as Russell Bufalino
- Ray Romano as Bill Bufalino
- Bobby Cannavale as Felix "Skinny Razor" DiTullio
- Anna Paquin as Peggy Sheeran
  - Lucy Gallina as Young Peggy Sheeran
- Stephen Graham as Anthony "Tony Pro" Provenzano
- Harvey Keitel as Angelo Bruno
- Stephanie Kurtzuba as Irene Sheeran
- Kathrine Narducci as Carrie Bufalino
- Welker White as Josephine "Jo" Hoffa
- Jesse Plemons as Chuckie O'Brien
- Jack Huston as Robert F. Kennedy
- Domenick Lombardozzi as Anthony "Fat Tony" Salerno
- Paul Herman as Whispers DiTullio
- Louis Cancelmi as Salvatore "Sally Bugs" Briguglio
- Rebecca Faulkenberry as Barbara Hoffa
- Gary Basaraba as Frank "Fitz" Fitzsimmons
- Marin Ireland as Dolores Sheeran
  - India Ennenga as Young Dolores
- Sebastian Maniscalco as "Crazy" Joe Gallo
- Steven Van Zandt as Jerry Vale
- Jennifer Mudge as Maryanne Sheeran
  - Tess Price as Young Maryanne
- Tony Suriano as Silver Shop's Owner Son

Additionally, several actors appear in smaller roles, including Aleksa Palladino as Mary Sheeran, Louis Vanaria as David Ferrie, Craig Vincent as Edward Partin, Kevin O'Rourke as John McCullough, Bo Dietl as Joey Glimco, Kate Arrington as Older Connie Sheeran, Jordyn DiNatale as Young Connie Sheeran, Jim Norton as Don Rickles, Al Linea as Sam "Momo" Giancana, Garry Pastore as Albert Anastasia, Daniel Jenkins as E. Howard "Big Ears" Hunt, Paul Ben-Victor as Jake Gottlieb, Patrick Gallo as Anthony "Tony Jack" Giacalone, Jake Hoffman as Allen Dorfman, Ken Clark as James P. Hoffa, Peter Jay Fernandez as Cecil B. Moore, Jeff Moore as Frank Church, Gino Cafarelli as Frank Rizzo, and Robert Funaro as Johnny, a Friendly Lounge bartender. Unnamed roles include Jonathan Morris and James Martin as priests, Action Bronson as a casket salesman, Vinny Vella as a meat company yard manager, Matt Walton as a TV host, Dascha Polanco as a nurse, and J. C. MacKenzie as federal prosecutor James F. Neal.

== Production ==
=== Development ===
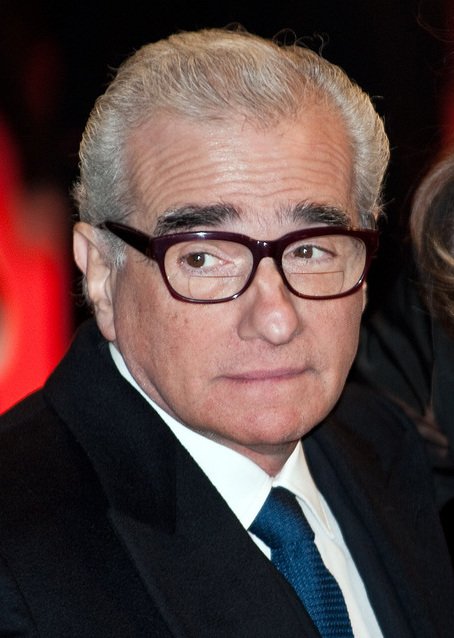
Martin Scorsese, the director and producer of the film, in 2010

In an interview with The Guardian, Scorsese mentioned that the original contemplation of this project started in the 1980s, stating: "Bob [De Niro] and I had tried for many years to come up with a project. This one actually started about 35 years ago with the idea of the remake of The Bad and the Beautiful and the sequel Two Weeks in Another Town. Somehow we exhausted that." Afterwards, Scorsese approached De Niro with an idea to do an aging hitman story, which did not move forward. Initially, De Niro and Scorsese were going to make a film adaptation of Don Winslow's 2006 novel The Winter of Frankie Machine. De Niro then revived that old discussion and "got the project underway" after reading a copy of the 2004 book I Heard You Paint Houses written by Charles Brandt, with Scorsese saying that De Niro "became rather emotional" as he told him about the lead character. Scorsese then became interested in directing a film adaptation of the book and in casting De Niro, Al Pacino, and Joe Pesci.

The Irishman started its development phase in 2007. New plot materials and rewrites caused the movie to lose its place in the film release calendar, and Scorsese went on to direct three more films, Hugo (2011), The Wolf of Wall Street (2013) and Silence (2016), before returning to The Irishman. In September 2014, after years of development hell, Pacino confirmed that the film would be Scorsese's next project after Silence. In October 2015, De Niro stated that the film was still happening and could have started filming in 2016 with Steven Zaillian confirmed as screenwriter. De Niro also served as a producer for the film. In July 2017, it was reported that the film would be presented as a series of flashbacks of an older Frank Sheeran, depicted as recollecting his many criminal activities over several decades, with De Niro appearing "as young as 24 years and as old as 80." Producer Irwin Winkler defined the project as "the coming together of people that have worked together since we're kids together", while Jane Rosenthal said that "what will surprise you is, as a Scorsese movie, it is a slower movie. ... It is guys looking at themselves through an older perspective."

=== Financing and budget ===
In May 2016, Mexican production company Fábrica de Cine had offered $100 million to finance the film, and through that deal Paramount Pictures would retain domestic rights. IM Global was also circling to bid for the film's international sales rights. STX Entertainment bought the international distribution rights to the film for $50 million beating out other studios like Universal Pictures, 20th Century Fox, and Lionsgate, while Fábrica de Cine closed the deal and Paramount retained its domestic rights.

By February 2017, Paramount Pictures had dropped domestic distribution rights for The Irishman following the announcement that Fábrica de Cine would not be financing the film due to its climbing budget. Netflix then bought the film rights for $105 million and agreed to finance the film's $125-million budget with a projected release date of October 2019. In March 2018, it was also reported the film's budget had ballooned from $125 million to $140 million, due in large part to the visual effects needed to make De Niro, Pacino, and Pesci appear younger at various points throughout the film. By August of that year, speculation had arisen that the cost had reportedly risen to as much as $175 million by the time post-production was to have wrapped, and some publications asserted that it might go as high as $200 million.

In August 2019, it was reported that the film's official cost was $159 million. However, reports on the production budget have continued to vary, occasionally noted as high as $200–250 million, (Note: Attributed to multiple references:) with Jeff Sneider of Collider saying: "No one is on the same page on the budget for this film. And let me tell you what that means. It means the budget is [way higher] than any of you are imagining."

=== Writing ===
In July 2009, Brandt received a phone call from De Niro that led to a meeting a month later between the two of them, Scorsese and screenwriter Steven Zaillian. The meeting was supposed to last an hour but ended up lasting four hours. Brandt said that "the material was new to them" and Zaillian already had a script ready, but the additions Brandt made required a do-over. To help, Brandt handed over a screenplay of his own. Brandt said, "Zaillian is a great writer, don't get me wrong ... I wanted to log the material." In the opening credits and as a reflection of the writing adaptation process, the final film is titled I Heard You Paint Houses, the name of the book on which the picture is based, while the title The Irishman appears only in the end credits.

The truthfulness of Sheeran's supposed confessions and the book on which the film was based has been challenged by "The Lies of the Irishman", an article on Slate by Bill Tonelli, as well as by "Jimmy Hoffa and The Irishman: A True Crime Story?" by legal scholar Jack Goldsmith, which appeared in The New York Review of Books. Chip Fleischer, the publisher of I Heard You Paint Houses, wrote a detailed reply to Tonelli's piece, calling it "irresponsible in the extreme, not to mention damaging." In an interview, De Niro defended the writing process of the film by stating, "We're not saying we're telling the actual story. We're telling our story."

=== Casting ===
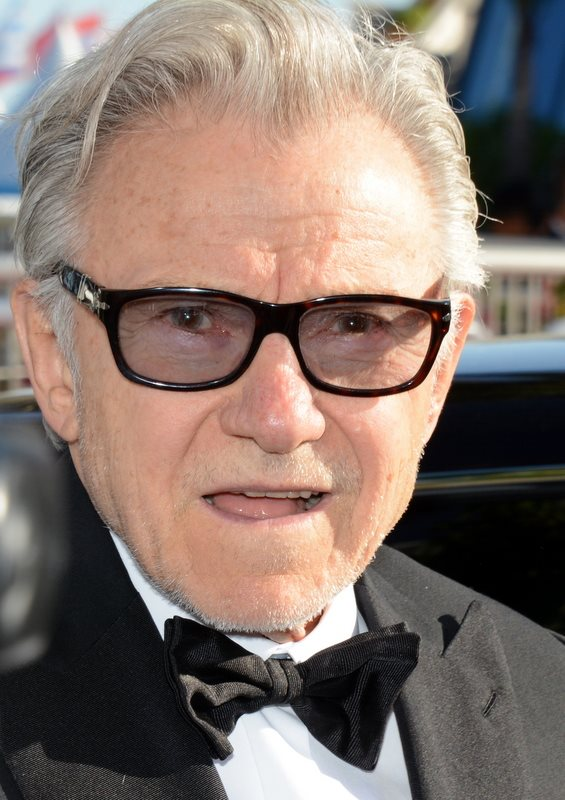
Harvey Keitel portrayed the mob boss Angelo Bruno.

The casting director for the film was Ellen Lewis, who was also the casting director in four other Scorsese films. In July 2017, Pacino and Pesci officially joined the cast, with Ray Romano also joining and Bobby Cannavale and Harvey Keitel in final negotiations. Pesci was offered his role a reported 50 times before agreeing to take part, at first saying he did not want to do "the gangster thing again", while Scorsese tried to persuade him The Irishman would be "different". De Niro played a big part in convincing Pesci to take the role, telling him "We gotta do this. Who knows if there'll be anything after?" In September 2017, Jack Huston, Stephen Graham, Domenick Lombardozzi, Jeremy Luke, Joseph Russo, Kathrine Narducci, Danny Abeckaser, J. C. MacKenzie, and Craig Vincent joined the cast. In October, Gary Basaraba, Anna Paquin, Welker White, and Jesse Plemons joined the cast of the film. Later, Craig Di Francia and Action Bronson were revealed to have joined the cast. Sebastian Maniscalco and Paul Ben-Victor were later revealed as being part of the cast.

The Irishman is the ninth feature collaboration between De Niro and Scorsese and their first since 1995's Casino; the fourth film to star both De Niro and Pacino (following The Godfather Part II, Heat, and Righteous Kill); the seventh to star both De Niro and Pesci (following Raging Bull, Once Upon a Time in America, Goodfellas, A Bronx Tale, Casino, and The Good Shepherd); the first to star both Pacino and Pesci; and the first time Pacino has been directed by Scorsese. Scorsese said of finally working with Pacino, "I'd been wanting to work with Al for years. Francis Coppola introduced me to him in 1970. Then he's in The Godfather one and two, and he's in the stratosphere. For me, Al was always something unreachable. We even tried to make a film in the 1980s but couldn't get the financing for it. I said, 'What's he like to work with?' Bob [De Niro] said, 'Oh, he's great. You'll see.'" Scorsese added that there is a meta aspect to seeing Pacino and De Niro interact in The Irishman, saying, "What you see in the film is their relationship as actors, as friends, over the past 40, 45 years. There's something magical that happens there."

=== Filming ===
Principal photography was originally set to start in August 2017, in and around New York City, and would continue through December 2017. Instead, filming began on September 18, 2017, in New York City and in the Mineola and Williston Park sections of Long Island, (Note: Attributed to multiple references:) and wrapped on March 5, 2018, for a total of 108 days. Additional scenes were filmed in the Hudson Valley in Salisbury Mills and Suffern, among other sites, including Paterson, New Jersey. (Note: Attributed to multiple references:) A posture coach was hired to instruct De Niro, Pacino, and Pesci on how to comport themselves like much younger men. The picture was primarily shot on 35 mm film with Arricam STs and LTs, and with RED Heliums for sections shot on digital, with two IR-capable Arri Alexa Minis as witness-cameras for the de-aging. Additionally, a Phantomflex camera was used to achieve high frame rates (300-700 fps) for slow-motion sequences. This was done to create to a more contemplative and surreal atmosphere, altering the audience's perception of time, as desired by Scorsese, allowing viewers to examine these moments as if they were still photographs in motion.

All scenes that required de-aging effects were shot digitally with a custom three-camera rig they called the "three-headed monster". Cinematographer Rodrigo Prieto's approach to filming these scenes was to ensure that the use of CGI did not interfere with the lighting. He wanted to light the scenes exactly as he would have without any CGI technology involved. To preserve this lighting during the de-aging process, the team used color charts, reference spheres, and still photographs on set, allowing for precise digital mapping and accurate recreation of the original lighting in post-production.

The Camera Language is described as "character driven" by Pietro. Frank Sheeran's character is introverted and views his involvement in the mob as simply a job. This was reflected in the cinematography, with simple shots and pans used for him, in contrast to the more dynamic camera movements employed for other characters. But the film's visual style, is also used to signify a character's energy or motivation beyond Frank Sheeran's. An example is Joe Gallo's introduction, where Scorsese designed a shot to present him like a rockstar, with the camera moving through foreground flashes and TV lights. Prieto further describes Scorsese’s meticulous shot planning as rhythmic and editing-focused always keeping the dramatic structure of the story in mind.

Concerning the look and feel of the movie, Scorsese envisioned the film as having an "old-fashioned" look which cinematographer Rodrigo Prieto accomplished by using "a series of lookup tables" for each scene. Ben Sherlock summarized the filming approach used for each historical decade depicted throughout the film, stating: "The '50s-set scenes have a Kodachrome look; the '60s-set scenes have an Ektachrome look; the '70s-set scenes have a silvery layer plastered over them; and any scene set in the '80s and onwards have a bleach bypass look, and are also more de-saturated than the other scenes." The extensive production design covered 117 filming locations, 319 scenes, 160 actors, in a story spanning 50 years. Producer Emma Tillinger Koskoff summarized her relation to Scorsese and his principal crew, stating: "I also work closely with the line producer, AD [Assistant Director] and DP [Director of Photography] on a budget and schedule, and we create a production plan that will realize Marty's vision. ... We scouted a lot. Our prep was almost six months; sometimes we were scouting after the day's wrap, trying to find new location ... due to weather or whatever; it was pretty insane."

Sandy Powell and Christopher Peterson were costume designer and co-designer, respectively. Speaking about Scorsese, Powell said, "one of the things he said on a first meeting was that we weren't doing the same kind of gangsters as Goodfellas or Casino ... These weren't flashy peacock looks. We were doing a low-key version. I mean, there are some obvious mafia types in there, but half of that is the way these people hold themselves." The film had a total of "250 characters and 6,500 extras", said Peterson, with Powell adding that "you need a lot of research, a lot of hard work, and you need to just get down and do it. ... You basically have to sort of divide your brain up into those five different decades, and approach it as if there are three or four films in one. You're filming more than one decade in one day, and that's when you'd have to really know what you were doing."

=== Editing ===
Bill Desowitz, writing for IndieWire, stated that the film had been considered as contending for an Oscar nomination for its editing. Editor Thelma Schoonmaker commented: "Marty wanted to show the banality of the violence ... It's not like the incredible camera moves or flashy editing of the earlier movies. Victims are killed in an instant—often in very simple wide shots. And his brilliant idea of slamming the titles in front of the audience (describing how various mob characters die) was a way of showing that being part of the Mafia is not a good idea". With a runtime of 209 minutes, it is the longest film of Scorsese's career.

=== Visual effects ===
There's a great deal of CGI because we're doing this youthification of De Niro, Pesci, and Al Pacino. They had to be CGI [...] Why I'm concerned, we're all concerned is that we're so used to watching them as the older faces. When we put them all together, it cuts back and forth [...] Now, it's real. Now, I'm seeing it. Now, certain shots need more work on the eyes, need more work on why these exactly the same eyes from the plate shot, but the wrinkles and things have changed. Does it change the eyes at all? If that's the case, what was in the eyes that I liked? Was it intensity? Was it gravitas? Was it threat?

— Martin Scorsese speaking on The A24 Podcast on May 15, 2019.

Industrial Light & Magic (ILM) and visual effects supervisor Pablo Helman handled the effects for the film. In August 2015, Scorsese and De Niro made a test reel by recreating a scene from Goodfellas (1990), to see if the de-aging could work. Scorsese said that "the risk was there, and that was it. We just tried to make the film. After sitting on the couch for ten years [...] we finally had a way." By the time the film was released, Pacino was 79 years old, with De Niro and Pesci both 76 years old. Scorsese and De Niro made the decision not to use motion tracking markers. Helman said, "He's not going to wear a helmet with little cameras in there ... He's going to want to be in the moment with Joe Pesci and Al Pacino on set, with no markers on him. So, if you're going to capture the performance, how are you going to do that?" Scenes that required the de-aging visual effects were shot digitally with a custom three-camera rig. Helman and his team had spent two years analyzing old films to determine how the actors should look at various ages.

In March 2018, speaking about the de-aging process, Pacino told IndieWire, "I was playing Jimmy Hoffa at the age of 39, they're doing that on a computer ... We went through all these tests and things ... Someone would come up to me and say, 'You're 39.' [You'd recall] some sort of memory of 39, and your body tries to acclimate to that and think that way. They remind you of it." The extent of the visual effects was made evident when the amount of effects was quantified by Indiewire stating: "Once again technology caught up with need when ILM developed an innovative, digital de-aging process without facial impediments ... The impressive results put ILM on the Academy's longlist this week for the VFX Oscar ... The costly VFX de-aging, therefore, became the tech centerpiece, with 1,750 shots created for two and a half hours of footage".

Following the completion of filming, cinematographer Rodrigo Prieto confirmed that the actors' eyes shown in the final film were their real eyes and had not been digitally recreated or replaced using CGI.

=== Music ===
Robbie Robertson and music supervisor Randall Poster compiled the soundtrack. It features both original and existing music tracks. Speaking to Rolling Stone, Robertson said, "This is probably the tenth film I've worked on with Marty [Scorsese], and every time we do it, it's a whole new experience ... The music score for The Irishman was an unusual feat. We were trying to discover a sound, a mood, a feel, that could work, over the many decades that this story takes place." Robertson also wrote the score for the film, although only his "Theme for the Irishman" appears on the soundtrack. Two tracks Robertson wrote for the film that appear in the credits, "I Hear You Paint Houses" and "Remembrance" featuring Frederic Yonnet on the diatonic harmonica, were included on his 2019 album Sinematic. The album was digitally released on November 1, 2019, followed by a physical release on November 29.

== Release ==
The Irishman had its world premiere at the 57th New York Film Festival on September 27, 2019, and had a limited theatrical release on November 1, 2019, followed by digital streaming on Netflix starting on November 27, 2019.

The Irishman's international premiere was at the Closing Night Gala of the BFI London Film Festival on October 13, 2019. The festival's director Tricia Tuttle said it was an "immense cinephile thrill" to close the event with an "epic of breathtakingly audacious scale and complexity" from "one of the true greats of cinema". The film also had screenings at numerous film festivals, including: Mill Valley, Hamptons, Lumière, San Diego, Mumbai, Rome, Philadelphia, Chicago, Tokyo, Camerimage, Los Cabos, Mar del Plata, and Cairo. Additionally, from November 1 to December 1, 2019, The Irishman screened at the Belasco Theatre in New York City, making it the first film to ever screen in the Belasco's 112-year history.

A 23-minute featurette of a roundtable discussion with Martin Scorsese, Robert De Niro, Al Pacino, and Joe Pesci titled The Irishman: In Conversation was released on Netflix on November 28, 2019. A three-part companion podcast for the film called Behind The Irishman was hosted by Sebastian Maniscalco, and published weekly from December 2 to 16, 2019; there were also three bonus episodes released on January 27, 30, and February 3, 2020.

=== Audience viewership ===
According to Nielsen, The Irishman was watched by 17.1 million people in its first five days of digital release in the United States, including 3.9 million on its debut day. While the overall total was lower than previous Netflix originals such as Bird Box (26 million over its first week in December 2018), 751,000 users watched the film in its entirety on its premiere date (18 percent), which was on par with Bird Box and higher than El Camino: A Breaking Bad Movie (11 percent). Nielsen also noted that the largest number of viewers to watch the film in its entirety (930,000) came on November 29, and its opening day demo was made up mostly of men aged 50–64 (20 percent), while they also made up an overall 15 percent of the viewership over the five-day period. Several days later, Netflix's chief content officer Ted Sarandos announced that a total of 26.4 million accounts worldwide had watched at least 70 percent of the film, meaning that about 16 percent of all Netflix account holders watched the film during its first week of release. He also estimated that total would reach 40 million after the film's first month of release. It was the fourth most watched Netflix film of 2019, and the fifth most popular Netflix release overall. In July 2020, Netflix revealed the film had in fact been watched by 64 million households over its first four weeks of release, among the most ever for one of their original films.

=== Limited theatrical release ===
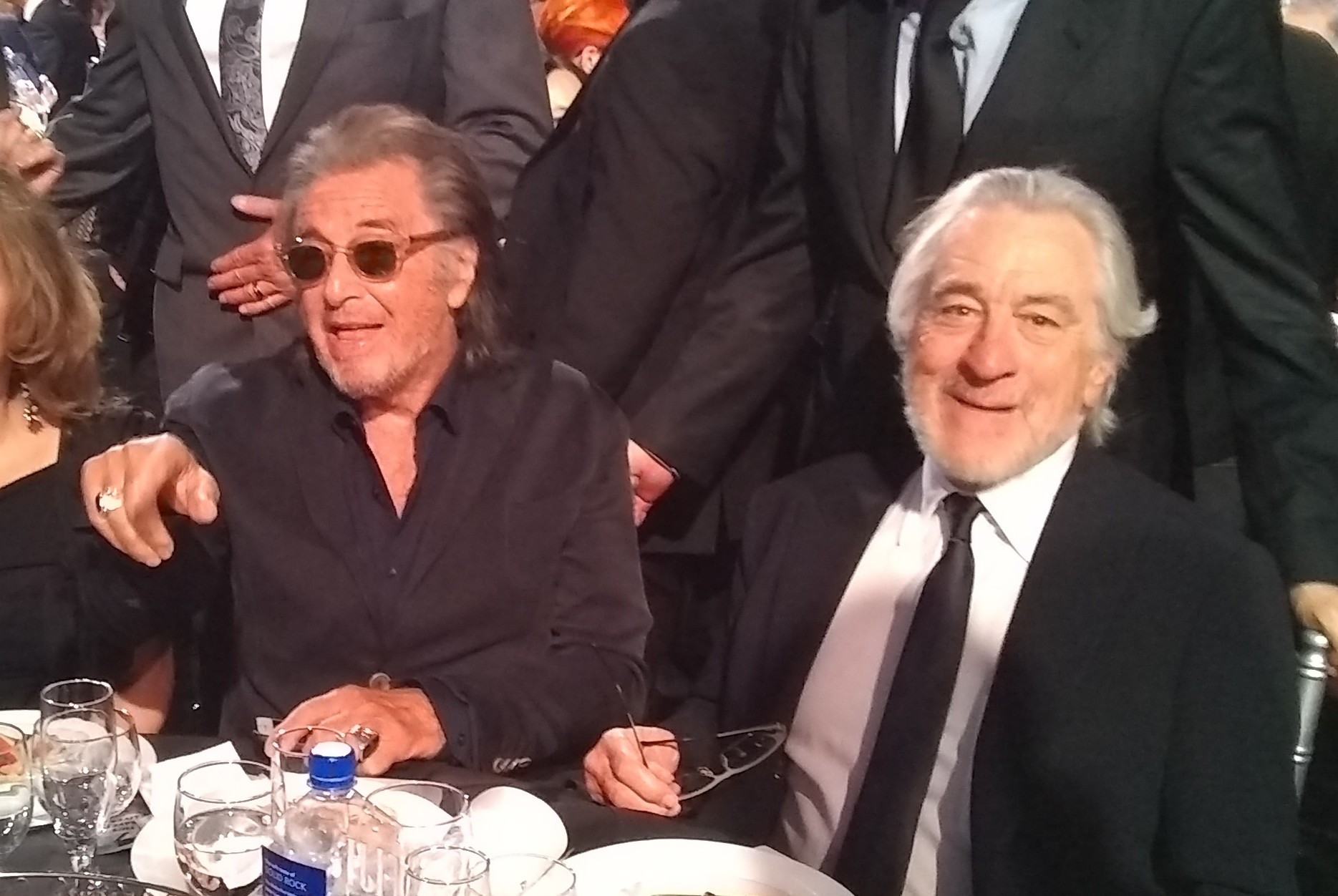
Al Pacino and Robert De Niro during the 25th Critics' Choice Awards in 2020

==== United States ====
The Irishman received a limited theatrical release on November 1, 2019, in the United States. As part of the continuing tensions between the film markets for direct-to-digital streaming and theatrical releases and distribution of films, several theater chains protested the policy of Netflix for the release of Scorsese's The Irishman. The film did not play at the theaters owned by AMC, Cinemark, Regal, or Cineplex, because the "four week progression to SVOD remains unacceptable to those chains." It was previously reported in February 2019 that Netflix would possibly give the film a wide theatrical release, at the request of Scorsese. The heads of several theater chains, including AMC's Adam Aron, who refused to play Roma the previous November, said they would only be open to playing The Irishman if Netflix "respects the decades old theatrical window, that suggests that movies come to theaters first for a couple of months, and then go to the home." Two major chains offered to exhibit the film if given an exclusivity window of 60 days, approximately two weeks shorter than the typical window, but could not reach an agreement with Netflix. The film peaked at playing in 500 theaters, essentially the most possible without the involvement of a major chain.

==== Other countries ====
In the United Kingdom, Altitude Film Distribution launched the film through the Everyman and Curzon cinema chains, where the film was shown on about 80 screens, while other British cinema chains, including Picturehouse, Vue, and Odeon, turned down the film in order to uphold the 90-day window that was standard practice across much of Europe. In Italy, The Irishman played on about 100 screens via Cineteca di Bologna, the same distributor that released Roma in 2018 and caused an uproar among Italian exhibitors, but no similar protests occurred over The Irishman. The film also received limited releases in Germany, Spain, Ireland, Japan, Brazil, South Korea, Canada, Australia, and New Zealand. The film did not play in France because of the country's 30-month window between a film's theatrical release and its availability on TV and other outlets. Despite all of this controversy, The Irishman became Netflix's biggest theatrical release both in the United States and internationally.

=== Marketing ===
The announcement trailer for the film premiered during the 91st Academy Awards ceremony on February 24, 2019. Netflix then released a teaser trailer on July 31, 2019, while the official trailer debuted on The Tonight Show Starring Jimmy Fallon on September 25, 2019. The final trailer was released on November 19, 2019. To promote the release of the film on its streaming service, Netflix took over five blocks of Little Italy, Manhattan, on November 22 and 23, 2019, and back-dated them to August 1, 1975, the day after Jimmy Hoffa was reported missing. The studio spent an estimated $50 million promoting the film, as well as an additional $40 million on its Oscar campaign.

=== Home media ===
The Irishman received director-approved special edition DVD and Blu-ray releases by The Criterion Collection on November 24, 2020. In November 2026, Criterion announced a director-approved Ultra HD Blu-ray edition, scheduled for release on February 16, 2027.

== Reception ==
=== Box office ===
The Irishman opened at three theaters in New York City and five in Los Angeles on November 1, 2019; while Netflix does not publicly disclose box office figures for its films, IndieWire estimated that it grossed a "strong" $350,000 in its opening weekend, an average $43,750 per venue. Deadline Hollywood noted that numerous showtimes at several theaters, including Grauman's Egyptian Theatre in Los Angeles and the IFC Center in New York, had sold-out showings. The site also argued that had the film gone wide theatrically, it likely would have become a box office bomb given its 209-minute runtime and large budget, noting that another period crime film with a long runtime that opened the same weekend, Motherless Brooklyn, failed to meet its projections. Conversely, CNBC wrote that Netflix was "leaving millions on the table" by not giving the film a wide theatrical release, and claimed it could have legged out to at least $100 million at the domestic box office, citing the high demand for tickets during its opening weekend (with some reselling for $65–85) and that Scorsese's last gangster film, The Departed, made $132 million in 2006. An opinion piece in the Chicago Tribune wrote the film "potentially could have brought in anywhere from $80–115 million" if it was released theatrically, and also contested that the film would lose Netflix as much as $280 million due to its high production and marketing costs compared to limited box office receipts.

Expanding to 22 theaters in its second weekend, the film made an estimated $440,000, for a ten-day running total of about $940,000. It then grossed an estimated $1.25 million from 175 theaters in its third week, and $1.2 million from 200 in its fourth. Despite being released on Netflix on November 27, the film expanded to 500 theaters in its fifth weekend, "close to the maximum number with most top theater chains refusing to let their customers have a chance to see it in theaters despite the acclaim and interest", and made an estimated $1 million. It then made an estimated $450,000 from 320 theaters in its sixth weekend—likely becoming Netflix's most successful theatrical release to-date with a running total of $6.7 million—and then $100,000 from 70 theaters in its seventh. Through its eighth and ninth weekend, the film was reduced to minimal theater play. The Irishman grossed an estimated $7 million in North America and $968,853 in other territories, for a worldwide total of $8 million.

=== Critical response ===
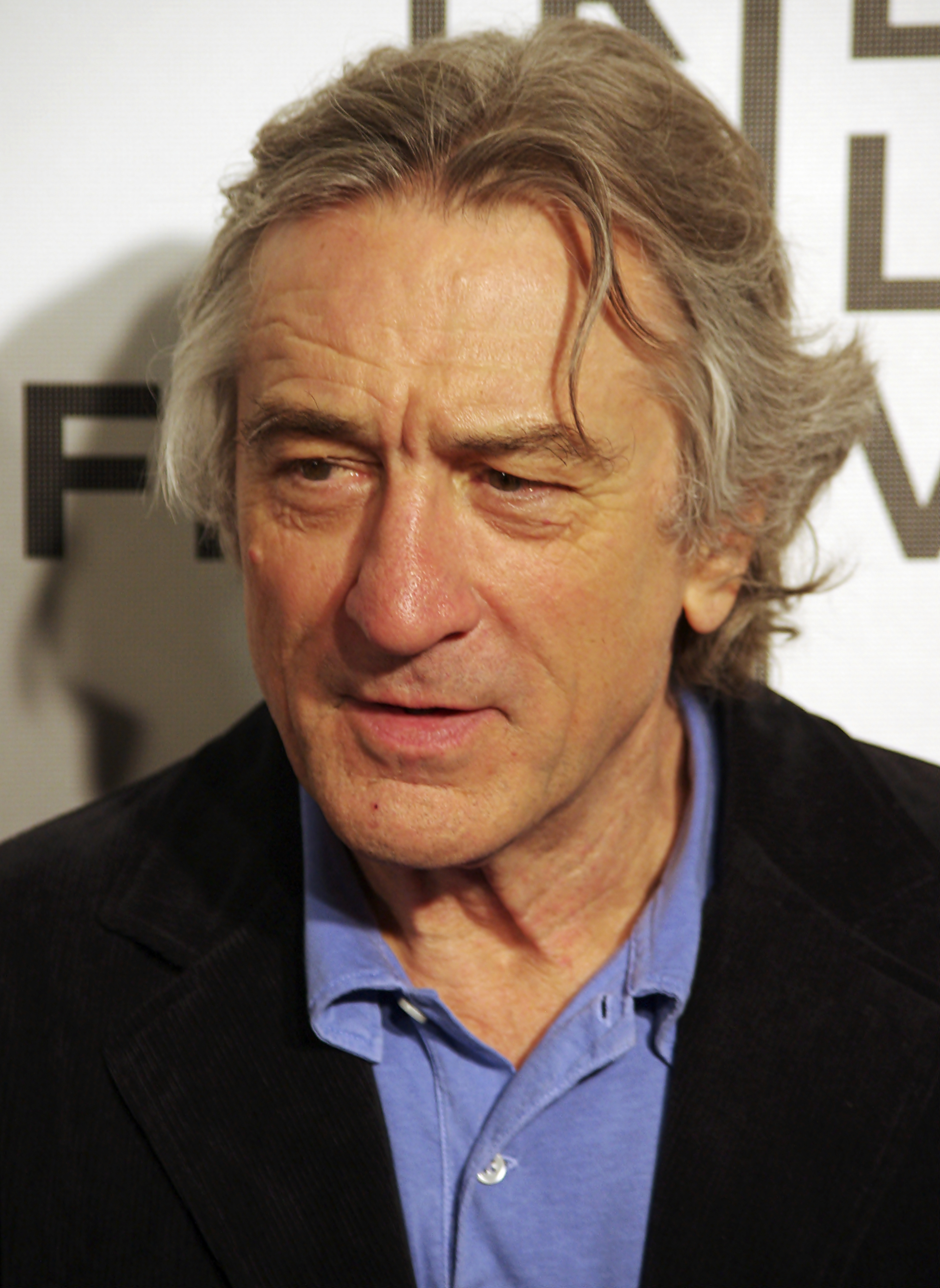
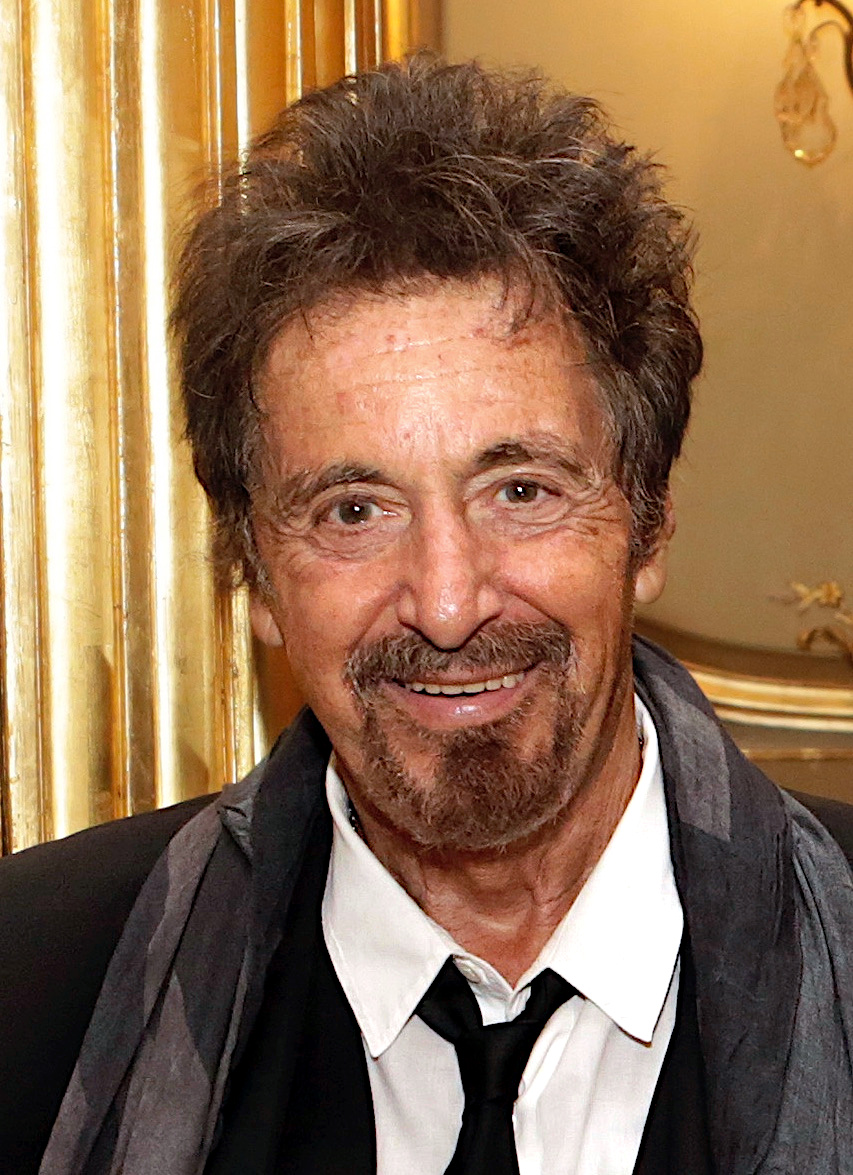
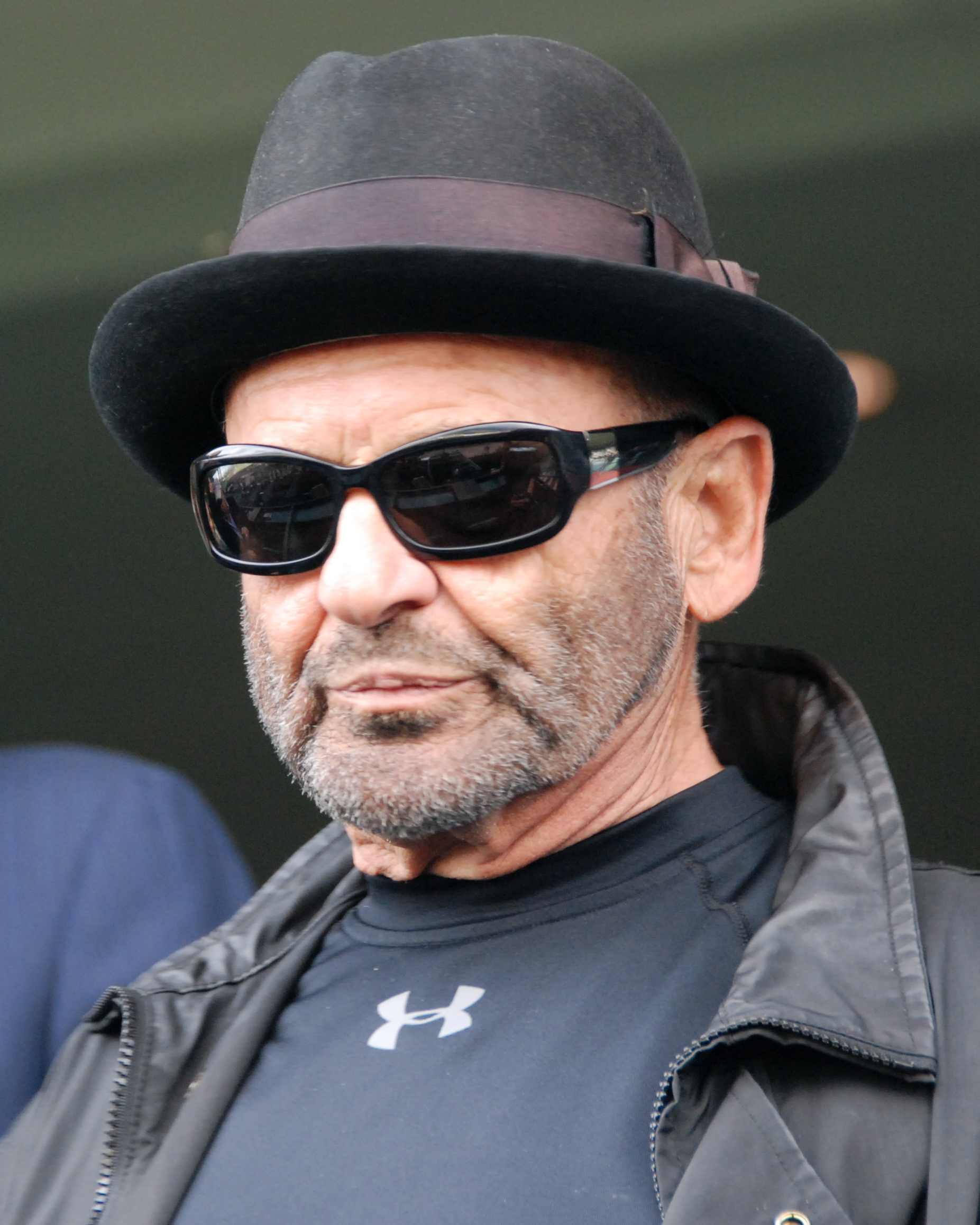
The performances of (left to right) Robert De Niro, Al Pacino, and Joe Pesci garnered critical acclaim, with the latter two being nominated for the Academy Award for Best Supporting Actor.

On review aggregator website Rotten Tomatoes, the film holds an approval rating of 95% based on 466 reviews, with an average rating of 8.8/10. The website's critics consensus reads: "An epic gangster drama that earns its extended runtime, The Irishman finds Martin Scorsese revisiting familiar themes to poignant, funny, and profound effect." Metacritic, which uses a weighted average, assigned the film a score of 94 out of 100 based on 55 critics, indicating "universal acclaim".

Writing for Time, Stephanie Zacharek gave The Irishman a perfect score, calling the film "clever and entertaining, to the point where you may think that's all it's going to be" and that "its last half-hour is deeply moving in a way that creeps up on you, and it's then that you see what Scorsese was working toward all along"; she also added that "the de-aging is distracting at first ... but the special effects are hardly a deal breaker, and in the end they probably add to the movie's mythological vibe". Similarly, Owen Gleiberman of Variety called it "a coldly enthralling, long-form knockout—a majestic Mob epic with ice in its veins", particularly praising Pacino's performance as "the film's most extraordinary". RogerEbert.com's Matt Zoller Seitz gave the film three and a half stars out of four, defining Scorsese as "one of the greatest living comedy directors who isn't described as such," and also praised the editing of Thelma Schoonmaker.

Benjamin Lee of The Guardian wrote that in the film "there's an almost meta-maturity, as if Scorsese is also looking back on his own career, the film leaving us with a haunting reminder not to glamorise violent men and the wreckage they leave behind." Mike Ryan of Uproxx called it a "phenomenal film", stating that the de-aging is "pretty good" and "the best I've seen so far", but noted that "if you stare at it, yes, you can see the imperfections ... but you do get used to it". IndieWire's Eric Kohn stated that "The Irishman is Martin Scorsese's best crime movie since Goodfellas, and a pure, unbridled illustration of what has made his filmmaking voice so distinctive for nearly 50 years", reserving particular praise for Steven Zaillian's screenplay, writing that "Zaillian hasn't delivered a script this polished since Moneyball." David Edelstein wrote for Vulture that "[Pesci] plays Bufalino as almost supernaturally focused and watchful, always hypersensitive to other peoples' rhythms. ... I thank the gods of acting that he came out of retirement to do this." He also praised the performances of De Niro and Pacino, stating that The Irishman is one of Scorsese's "most satisfying films in decades". Writing for TheWrap, Alonso Duralde praised Rodrigo Prieto's cinematography and Scorsese's direction, writing that "at the age of 76, Scorsese is embracing new technologies with the fervor of Ang Lee ... and indulging in retro fantasy with the keen eye of Quentin Tarantino". Nicholas Rapold of Film Comment, gave the de-aging CGI approach used in the filming a mixed assessment, stating that: "De Niro's rosy complexion as a truck driver 'kid' recalls a tinted postcard photo more than a twentysomething person, and I can't explain away the same de-aged De Niro curb-stomping a grocer, looking more like the septuagenarian star he is than a ferociously protective thirtysomething dad."

While giving a positive review, David Rooney of The Hollywood Reporter criticized the running time, stating that "the excessive length ultimately is a weakness" and "that the material would have been better served by losing an hour or more to run at standard feature length." Writing for the National Review, Kyle Smith gave a more critical review, saying that "while it's a good film, it isn't a great one" and also commented that "[The Irishman] could easily be trimmed by 30 minutes or more by tightening up the midsection." Conversely, Richard Brody of The New Yorker wrote "it runs a minute shy of three and a half hours, and I wouldn't wish it any shorter", and Karen Han of Polygon said that "Scorsese is so adept at storytelling, and his cast is so unbelievable, that the film ... barely feels its length."

The Irishman also garnered acclaim from a number of filmmakers, many of whom listed the film as one of their favorites of 2019, including Ana Lily Amirpour, Olivier Assayas, Bong Joon-ho, Guillermo del Toro, Luca Guadagnino, Ciro Guerra, Bill Hader, Don Hertzfeldt, Alejandro Landes, Alex Ross Perry, Paul Schrader, Adam Wingard, and Quentin Tarantino, who ranked it as his favorite of the year while former U.S. President Barack Obama added the movie to his annual list for his favorite films and television series of 2019.

=== Legacy ===
Since its release, it has been widely cited as one the most important films of Scorsese's career. In 2020, it ranked number 28 on Empire's list of the "100 Greatest Movies of the 21st Century," calling it a blend of "the multiple-decade-spanning storytelling of Goodfellas with the quiet, ruminative tone of Silence." In 2021, it tied for number 19 with Inside Out (2015) on Newsweek's list of "The 100 Best Films of the 21st Century." In November 2023, Collider ranked it number 16 on its list of the "25 Best Epic Movies of All Time," with Jeremy Urquhart writing "It's a gangster movie and a tragic story about aging, loneliness, and deep regret, following an elderly hitman as he reflects on his life of crime. Throughout the film, The Irishman reveals itself to be about the unstoppable nature of death, and the guilt that one can feel as it approaches and one realizes how a life was perhaps misspent." That same month, it ranked number 30 on Rolling Stone's list of "The 100 Best Movies of the 21st Century."

=== Accolades ===
At the 92nd Academy Awards, The Irishman received 10 nominations for Best Picture, Best Director, Best Supporting Actor for Pacino and Pesci, Best Adapted Screenplay, Best Production Design, Best Cinematography, Best Costume Design, Best Film Editing, and Best Visual Effects, although it failed to win any. It was also nominated for five awards at the 77th Golden Globe Awards, including Best Motion Picture – Drama.

== Themes ==
In his critical comments on the film and after noting Scorsese's many contributions to the mobster and gangster film genre, Nicholas Rapold of the Lincoln Center Film Society interpreted the main themes of the film as dealing more with the subject of the remorseless sociopathic and psychopathic killer than with themes directly related to organized crime. After comparing the film to David Cronenberg's A History of Violence, Rapold stated:

Frank is not psychopathic, but sociopathic. Whichever the case, one might ask how unusual Frank in The Irishman is meant to be. Oddly enough, people in recent years have been spending quite a bit of their spare time watching killers, and in situations outside the usual context of law enforcement. Watching or rewatching assorted acclaimed TV series, I couldn't help noticing how many zero in on people for whom killing is routine: The Sopranos, The Americans, Barry, Mindhunter, Killing Eve, Dexter. (There's also the apocalyptic strand in which almost everyone has already died, like The Leftovers, or everyone is dead, like The Good Place, or in the niche case of Russian Doll, one person keeps dying.) Very often these shows return to the hollowing-out that is felt through the destruction of human life and through the maintenance of the double life required to insulate that pursuit.

Richard Brody, writing for The New Yorker, found the film to be a dark allegory of American politics and American society, stating:

The real-life Hoffa [was] a crucial player in both gangland politics and the actual practical politics of the day, and the movie's key through line is the inseparability of those two realms. The Irishman is a sociopolitical horror story that views much of modern American history as a continuous crime in motion, in which every level of society—from domestic life through local business through big business through national and international politics—is poisoned by graft and bribery, shady deals and dirty money, threats of violence and its gruesome enactment, and the hard-baked impunity that keeps the entire system running.

Guillermo del Toro agrees with Brody:

Martin Scorsese ... has long been the primary chronicler of violence and greed in America, as he clearly understands that one cannot exist without the other and that they are both touchstones of a way of life and, probably, the country itself.

In his extended comments on The Irishman, del Toro found the thematic content of the film and its depiction of character development to be comparable to the films of "Renoir, Bresson, Bergman, Oliveira or Kurosawa". Using cinematic techniques involving interconnected flashbacks and flashforwards, del Toro found Scorsese's juxtaposition of the "ruthless gangster" depicted in Frank Sheeran with his "diminished, elderly self" as compelling depictions of where "oblivion reigns supreme". Del Toro's thematic emphasis, as he attributes it to Scorsese, is the portrayal of the demise of Sheeran in the frailty of his old age as overshadowing the ruthless and relentless accumulation of his criminal activities which defined his more youthful years, with old age transforming Sheeran into a forgotten shadow of his former self.

== See also ==
- Hoffa (1992), a biographical drama film about the life of Jimmy Hoffa, directed by Danny DeVito.
- Robert F. Kennedy in media
