= Jimmy Hoffa =

American labor union leader (born 1913; disappeared 1975)

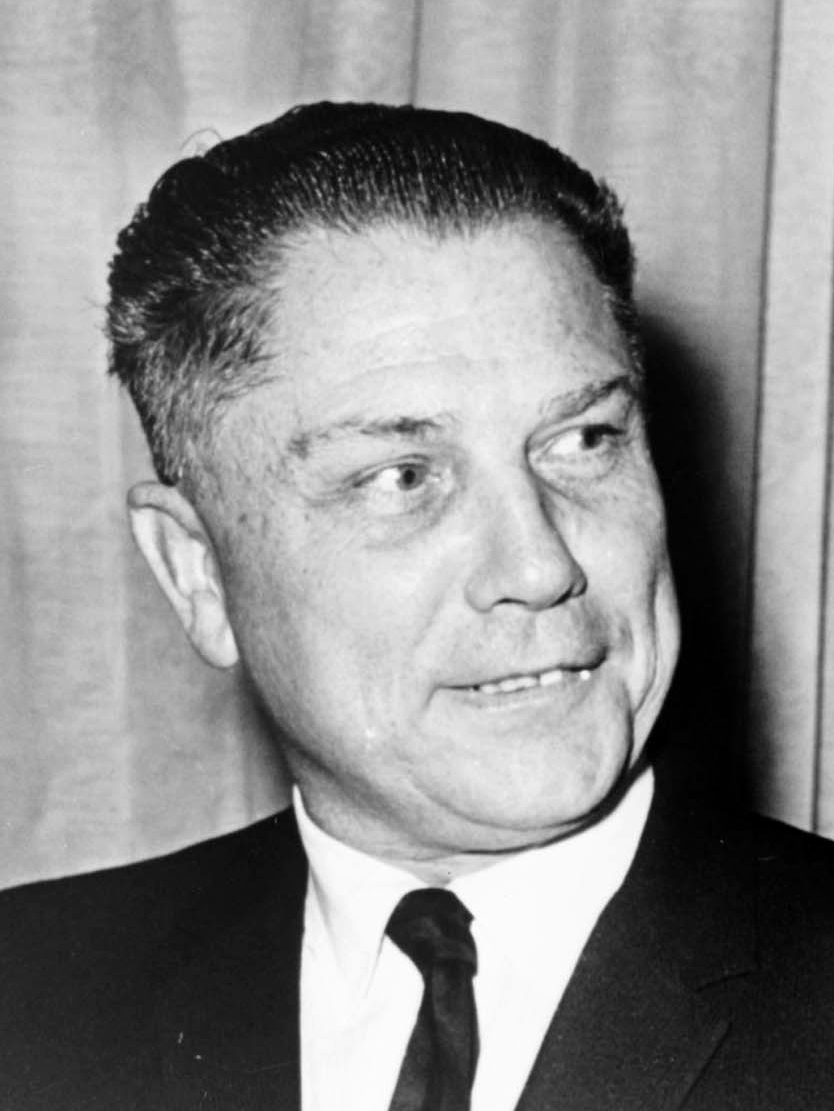
- Hoffa in 1965
- Born: James Riddle Hoffa; February 14, 1913; Brazil, Indiana, U.S.
- Disappeared: July 30, 1975 (aged 62); Bloomfield Township, Michigan, U.S.
- Status: Declared dead in absentia July 30, 1982 (aged 69)
- Occupation: Trade unionist
- Spouse: Josephine Poszywak (m. 1936)
- Children: Barbara Ann Crancer; James P. Hoffa

General President of the International Brotherhood of Teamsters
- In office October 5, 1957 – June 19, 1971
- Preceded by: Dave Beck
- Succeeded by: Frank Fitzsimmons
- Criminal information
- Convictions: Attempted bribery and jury tampering (1964); Conspiracy, mail and wire fraud (1964)
- Penalty: Aggregate of 13 years imprisonment (eight years for bribery, five years for fraud; 1967)

James Riddle Hoffa (Note: Pronounced: /ˈhɒfə/;) (born February 14, 1913; disappeared July 30, 1975; declared dead July 30, 1982) was an American labor union leader who served as the General President of the International Brotherhood of Teamsters (IBT) from 1957 to 1971. He was alleged to have ties to organized crime, and he disappeared under mysterious circumstances in 1975.

From an early age, Hoffa was a union activist; he became an important regional figure with the IBT by his mid-20s. By 1952, he was the national vice-president of the IBT and between 1957 and 1971, he served as its general president. Hoffa secured the first national agreement for teamsters' rates in 1964 with the National Master Freight Agreement. He played a major role in the growth and the development of the union, which eventually became the largest by membership in the United States, with over 2.3 million members at its peak, during his terms as its leader.

Hoffa became involved with organized crime from the early years of his Teamsters work: a connection that continued until his disappearance. He was convicted of jury tampering, attempted bribery, and conspiracy, along with mail and wire fraud in 1964 in two separate trials. He was imprisoned in 1967 and sentenced to 13 years.

In mid-1971, Hoffa resigned as president of the union as part of a commutation agreement with U.S. President Richard Nixon and was released later that year, but he was barred from union activities until 1980. Hoping to regain support and to return to IBT leadership, he unsuccessfully tried to overturn the order. Hoffa disappeared on July 30, 1975: he is thought to have been murdered in a Mafia hit and was declared legally dead in 1982. Hoffa's legacy and the circumstances of his disappearance continue to stir debate and conspiracy theories.

== Early life and family ==
James Riddle Hoffa was born in Brazil, Indiana, on February 14, 1913, to John and Viola (née Riddle) Hoffa, the third of four children, two boys and two girls. The doctor who delivered him originally thought Hoffa's mother had a tumor, not a baby, in her abdomen, so he was initially referred to as "The Tumor". His father, who was of German descent from what is now referred to as the Pennsylvania Dutch, died in 1920 from lung disease when Hoffa was seven years old. His mother was of Irish ancestry. The family moved to Detroit in 1924, where Hoffa was raised and lived for the rest of his life. He left school at the age of 14 and began working full-time manual labor jobs to help support his family.

Hoffa married Josephine Poszywak, an 18-year-old Detroit laundry worker of Polish heritage, in Bowling Green, Ohio, on September 25, 1936. The couple had met six months earlier during a non-unionized laundry workers' strike action; Hoffa described the meeting as feeling as though he had been "hit on the chest with a blackjack". They had two children: a daughter, Barbara Ann Crancer, and a son, James P. Hoffa. The Hoffas paid $6,800 in 1939 ($157,392 in 2025) for a modest home in northwestern Detroit. The family later owned a simple summer lakefront cottage in Orion Township, Michigan, north of Detroit.

== Early union activity ==
Hoffa began union organizational work at the grassroots level as a teenager through his job with a grocery chain, which paid substandard wages and offered poor working conditions with minimal job security. The workers were displeased with that situation and tried to organize a union to better their wages. Although Hoffa was young, his courage and approachability in that role impressed fellow workers, and he rose to a leadership position. By 1932, after refusing to work for an abusive shift foreman, Hoffa left the grocery chain, partly because of his union activities. He was then invited to become an organizer with Local 299 of the Teamsters in Detroit. Between 1933 and 1935, Hoffa actively worked to recruit new members to the union; his favored tactic was to pull up on the road alongside sleeping truck drivers, wake them up, and give them his sales pitch.

== Growth of Teamsters ==
The Teamsters, founded in 1903, had 75,000 members in 1933. As a result of Hoffa's work with other union leaders, he consolidated local union trucker groups into regional sections and then into a national body, which Hoffa ultimately completed over two decades; membership grew to 170,000 members by 1936, and three years later, to 420,000. The number grew steadily during World War II and in the postwar boom to eventually top a million members by 1951.

The Teamsters organized truck drivers and warehousemen throughout the Midwest and then nationwide. Hoffa played a major role in the union's skillful use of "quickie strikes", secondary boycotts, and other means of leveraging union strength at one company, moves to organize workers at another, and finally to win contract demands at other companies. That process, which took several years starting in the early 1930s, eventually brought the Teamsters to a position of being one of the most powerful unions in the United States. Trucking unions in that era were heavily influenced by, and in many cases controlled by, elements of organized crime. To unify and expand trucking unions, Hoffa made accommodations and arrangements with many gangsters, beginning in the Detroit area. Organized crime's influence on the IBT increased as the union grew.

== Rise to power ==
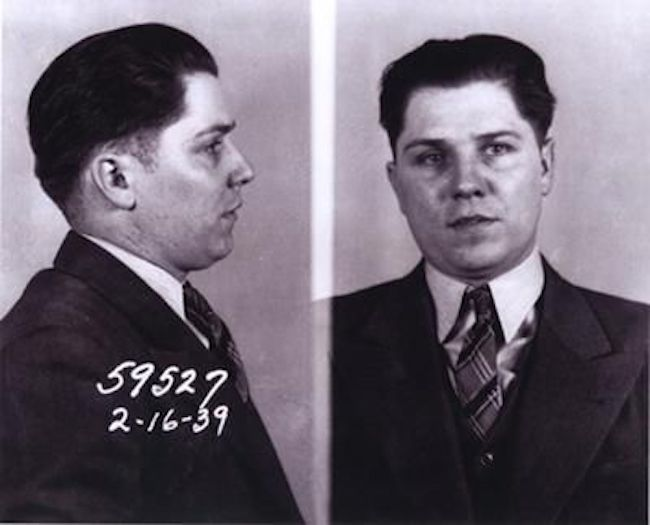
Hoffa mugshot in 1939

Hoffa worked to defend the Teamsters from raids by other unions, including the Congress of Industrial Organizations, and he extended the Teamsters' influence in the Midwest from the late 1930s to the late 1940s. Hoffa obtained a deferment from military service in World War II by successfully making a case for his union leadership skills being of more value to the nation by keeping freight running smoothly to assist the war effort. Although he never actually worked as a truck driver, he became president of Local 299 in December 1946. He then rose to lead the combined group of Detroit-area locals shortly afterwards and later advanced to become head of the Michigan Teamsters groups.

At some point in the late 1940s he became friends with Paul Dorfman, associate of the Chicago Outfit. According to the McClellan Committee, Dorfman was "the contact man between dishonest union leaders and members of the Chicago Underworld". It was through Dorfman that Hoffa began to establish relationships with Chicago organized crime. He introduced Hoffa to former Capone associates like Joseph Glimco and Paul Ricca. In 1949 Dorfman introduced Hoffa to his stepson Allen Dorfman, who became heavily involved in Teamsters corruption. According to FBI files, Dorfman agreed to introduce Hoffa to mob figures in exchange for Allen's entry into the Teamsters' insurance business. In his book The Enemy Within (1960), Senator Bobby Kennedy, Chief Counsel of the McClellan Committee, stated that Dorfman and Hoffa "are now as one. Everywhere Hoffa goes, Dorfman is close by. Most important decisions by Hoffa are made only after consultation with Paul Dorfman".

At the 1952 IBT convention in Los Angeles, Hoffa was selected as national vice-president by incoming president Dave Beck, the successor to Daniel J. Tobin, who had been president since 1907. Hoffa had quelled an internal revolt against Tobin by securing Central States' regional support for Beck at the convention. In exchange, Beck made Hoffa a vice-president.

In 1952, a petty criminal living in New York, Marvin Elkind, was assigned by gangster Anthony Salerno to work as Hoffa's chauffeur. In a 2008 interview, Elkind said of his four years working as a chauffeur: "Mr. Hoffa was a tremendously intimidating man. This man had no fear at all, of nothing, showed very little emotion, had completely no sense of humour, and was dedicated to the people that belonged to his union. When you drive these people you learn a lot and I'll tell you why. They don't know you're there. You become a piece of the car, just like an extra gear shift or a brake, and they talk."

The IBT moved its headquarters from Indianapolis to Washington, D.C., taking over a large office building in the capital in 1955. IBT staff was also enlarged, with many lawyers hired to assist with contract negotiations. Following his 1952 election as vice-president, Hoffa began spending more of his time away from Detroit, either in Washington or traveling around the country for his expanded responsibilities. Hoffa's personal lawyer was Bill Bufalino.

== Teamsters presidency ==
Hoffa took over the presidency of the Teamsters in 1957, at the convention in Miami Beach, Florida. Beck, his predecessor, had appeared before the John L. McClellan-led U.S. Senate Select Committee on Improper Activities in Labor or Management Field in March 1957 and took the Fifth Amendment 140 times. Beck was under indictment when the IBT convention took place and was convicted and imprisoned in a trial for fraud held in Seattle.

=== Teamsters expelled from AFL-CIO ===
At the 1957 AFL-CIO convention, held in Atlantic City, New Jersey, union members voted nearly five to one to expel the IBT. Vice-president Walter Reuther led the fight to oust the IBT on charges of Hoffa's corrupt leadership. President George Meany gave an emotional speech, advocating the removal of the IBT and stating that he could only agree to further affiliation of the Teamsters if they dismissed Hoffa as their president. Meany demanded a response from Hoffa, who replied through the press, "We'll see." At the time, the IBT was bringing in over $750,000 annually to the AFL-CIO.

=== National Master Freight Agreement ===
Following his re-election as president in 1961, Hoffa worked to expand the union. In 1964, he succeeded in bringing virtually all over-the-road truck drivers in North America under a single National Master Freight Agreement, which may have been his biggest achievement in a lifetime of union activity. Hoffa then tried to bring airline workers and other transport employees into the union, with limited success. His tenure became increasingly complicated by personal troubles, as he was under investigation, on trial, launching appeals of convictions, or imprisoned for virtually all of the 1960s.

Hoffa was re-elected without opposition to a third five-year term as president of the IBT at the union's Miami Beach convention in 1966, despite having been convicted of jury tampering and mail fraud in court verdicts that were stayed pending review on appeal. Aware of his perilous legal situation, the delegates also elected Frank Fitzsimmons as first vice president, who would become president "if Hoffa has to serve a jail term."

== Criminal charges ==
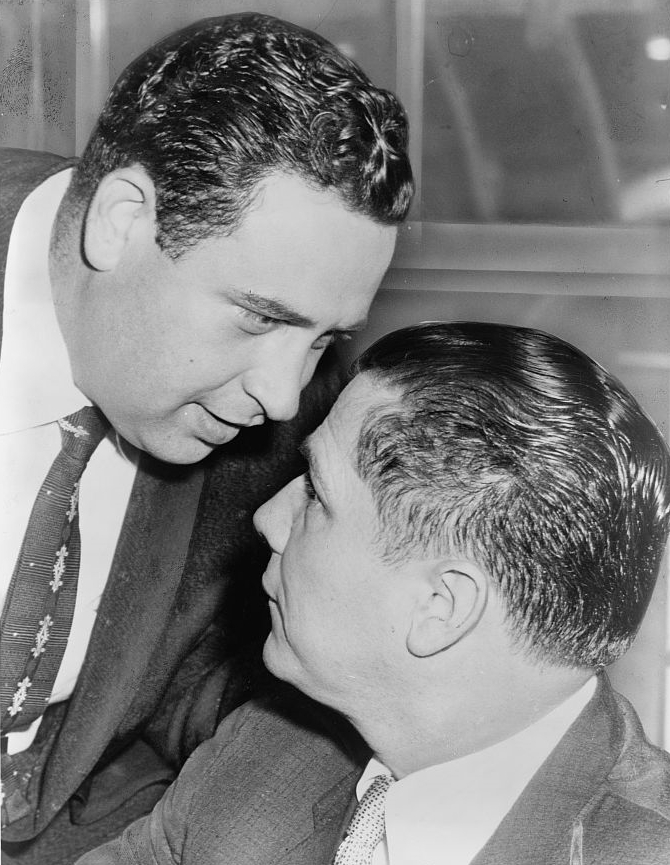
Hoffa (right) and Bernard Spindel after a 1957 court session in which they pleaded not guilty to illegal wiretap charges

Hoffa faced major criminal investigations in 1957, as a result of the McClellan Committee. On March 14, 1957, Hoffa was arrested for allegedly trying to bribe an aide to the Select Committee. Hoffa denied the charges (and was later acquitted), but the arrest triggered additional investigations and more arrests and indictments over the following weeks. One of Hoffa's associates, Frank Kierdorf, on the night of August 3, 1958, while torching a cleaning and dyeing establishment, accidentally set himself on fire. When asked by a prosecuting attorney, a devout man, in a hospital, if he wanted to confess to anything, he uttered his final words, "Go fuck yourself."

Hoffa tried to prevent John F. Kennedy's election in 1960, endorsing the challenger and incumbent Vice-president Richard Nixon. In prior elections, the union had normally supported Democratic nominees. However this failed and Kennedy appointed his younger brother Robert as Attorney General. Robert Kennedy had been frustrated in earlier attempts to convict Hoffa, while working as counsel to the McClellan subcommittee. As attorney general from 1961, Kennedy pursued a strong attack on organized crime and he carried on with a "Get Hoffa" squad of prosecutors and investigators. The two had a personal and bitter animosity, which Hoffa described as a "blood feud". In 1963 Hoffa set up DRIVE (Democratic, Republican, Independent Voter Education), the Teamsters political action committee that funded its favored candidates.

During a court hearing on December 5, 1962, a former mental patient, Warren Swanson, fired several pellets at Hoffa. The pellets did no harm, and the enraged Hoffa punched Swanson and knocked him down, while Charles "Chuckie" O'Brien and others overpowered him. Hoffa later told reporters "You always run away from a man with a knife, and toward a man with a gun."

=== Prison sentences ===
In May 1963, Hoffa was indicted for jury tampering in Tennessee, charged with the attempted bribery of a grand juror during his 1962 conspiracy trial in Nashville. Primarily on the testimony of Edward Partin, Hoffa was convicted on March 4, 1964, and subsequently sentenced to eight years in prison and a $10,000 fine. While on bail during his appeal, Hoffa was convicted in a second trial held in Chicago, on July 26, 1964, on one count of conspiracy and three counts of mail and wire fraud for improper use of the Teamsters' pension fund, and sentenced to five years in prison. (Note: Hoffa was convicted of embezzling money from a Teamster-run pension fund and using it to invest in a Florida retirement community. In return, Hoffa had a 45 percent interest in the project, and he and several others received kickbacks in the form of "finder's fees" from developers for securing the money.) Hoffa spent the next three years unsuccessfully appealing his 1964 convictions. Appeals filed by his chief counsel, defense attorney Morris Shenker, reached the U.S. Supreme Court. He began serving his aggregate prison sentence of 13 years (eight years for bribery, five years for fraud) on March 7, 1967, at the Lewisburg Federal Penitentiary in Pennsylvania.

=== Appointment of Fitzsimmons as caretaker president ===
When Hoffa entered prison, Frank Fitzsimmons was named acting president of the union. Hoffa had planned for his possible conviction, and intended to use Fitzsimmons as a figurehead through which he could remain in control. Fitzsimmons was a Hoffa loyalist, fellow Detroit resident, and a longtime member of Teamsters Local 299, who owed his own high position in large part to Hoffa's influence. Despite this, Fitzsimmons soon distanced himself from Hoffa's influence and control after 1967, to Hoffa's displeasure. Fitzsimmons also decentralized power somewhat within the IBT's administration structure, forgoing much of the control Hoffa took advantage of as union president. While still in prison, Hoffa resigned as Teamsters president on June 19, 1971, and Fitzsimmons was elected Teamsters president on July 9, 1971.

== After prison ==
On December 23, 1971, less than five years into his 13-year sentence, Hoffa was released from prison when U.S. President Richard Nixon commuted it to time served. As a result of Hoffa's previous resignation, he was awarded a $1.75 million lump sum termination benefit by the Teamsters Retirement and Family Protection Plan. That type of pension settlement had never occurred with the Teamsters. The IBT then endorsed Nixon, a Republican, in his presidential re-election bid in 1972.

Hoffa regained his freedom, but the commutation from Nixon did not allow Hoffa to "engage in the direct or indirect management of any labor organization" until March 6, 1980. Hoffa contended that he had never agreed to that condition. Hoffa accused senior Nixon administration figures, including Attorney General John N. Mitchell and White House Special Counsel Charles Colson, of depriving him of his rights by imposing that condition. It was suspected that the condition had been imposed upon Hoffa because of requests from the Teamsters' leadership, but that was denied by Fitzsimmons. By 1973, Hoffa was planning to seize the presidency of the Teamsters again.

Hoffa sued to invalidate the restriction so that he could reassert his power over the Teamsters. John Dean, former White House counsel to Nixon, was among those called upon for depositions in 1974 court proceedings. Dean, who had become famous as a government witness in prosecutions arising from the Watergate scandal by mid-1973, had drafted the clause in 1971 at Nixon's request. Hoffa ultimately failed to win his case since the court ruled that Nixon had acted within his powers by imposing the restriction, as it had been based on Hoffa's misconduct while he was serving as a Teamsters official.

Facing immense resistance to his ambition to regain the Teamsters presidency, and with much of his old influence lost, Hoffa accepted a non-management position with Local 299 in Detroit, his old power base; Hoffa likely hoped that with time, he would be able to work his way back up the ladder. In 1975, Hoffa was working on an autobiography, Hoffa: The Real Story, which was published a few months after his disappearance. He had earlier published a book titled The Trials of Jimmy Hoffa (1970). At the time of his disappearance, Hoffa lived with his family at their summer cottage in the village of Lake Orion, which was about a half-hour drive from the restaurant where he was last seen. His home was located on a multi-acre wooded lot on Square Lake. The property had a house with over 2,500 square feet, as well as outbuildings.

== Disappearance ==
=== Prelude ===
Hoffa's plans to regain the leadership of the union were met with opposition from several members of the Mafia. One of them was Anthony Provenzano, who had been a Teamsters local leader in New Jersey and a national vice-president of the union during Hoffa's second term as its president. Provenzano was a caporegime in the New York City Genovese crime family. At least two of Provenzano's opponents in the union had been murdered, and others who had spoken out against him had been assaulted. Provenzano, once an ally of Hoffa, became an enemy after they reportedly had a feud when both were in federal prison at Lewisburg, Pennsylvania, in the 1960s. In 1973 and 1974, Hoffa asked him for his support to regain his former position, but he refused, and reportedly threatened Hoffa by saying he would pull out his guts or kidnap his grandchildren.

Other Mafia figures who became involved in the conflict between Hoffa and Provenzano were Anthony Giacalone, an alleged kingpin in the Detroit Mafia, and his younger brother, Vito. The FBI believes that they were positioning themselves as "mediators" between Hoffa and Provenzano. The brothers had made three visits to Hoffa's home at Lake Orion and one to the Guardian Building law offices. Their avowed purpose in meeting Hoffa was to set up a "peace meeting" between Provenzano and Hoffa. Hoffa's son, James, said, "Dad was pushing so hard to get back in office, I was increasingly afraid that the mob would do something about it." James was convinced that the "peace meeting" was a pretext to Giacalone's "setting Dad up" for a hit since Hoffa had been increasingly uneasy each time the Giacalone brothers arrived.

=== Events of July 30 ===
Hoffa disappeared on Wednesday, July 30, 1975, after he had gone to a meeting with Provenzano and Giacalone. The meeting was to take place at 2:00 p.m. at the Machus Red Fox restaurant in Bloomfield Township, a Detroit suburb; it was the same place where the wedding reception of Hoffa's son James had been held. Hoffa wrote Giacalone's initials and the time and location of the meeting in his office calendar: "TG—2 p.m.—Red Fox."

Hoffa left his Lake Orion home at 1:15 p.m. Before heading to the restaurant, he stopped at the Pontiac office of Louis Linteau, a former president of Teamsters Local 614 who now ran a limousine service. Linteau and Hoffa had been enemies early in their careers, but eventually became close friends. When Hoffa left prison, Linteau had also become Hoffa's unofficial appointment secretary and had arranged a dinner meeting between Hoffa and the Giacalone brothers on July 26 in which they had informed him of the July 30 meeting. Linteau was out to lunch when Hoffa stopped by, so Hoffa talked to some of the staff present and left a message for Linteau before he left for the Machus Red Fox.

Between 2:15 and 2:30 p.m., an annoyed Hoffa called his wife from a payphone on a post in front of Damman Hardware, directly behind the Machus Red Fox, and complained that Giacalone had not shown up and that he had been stood up. His wife told him she had not heard from anyone. He told her he would be home in Lake Orion by 4:00 p.m. to grill steaks for dinner. Several witnesses saw Hoffa standing by his car and pacing the restaurant's parking lot. Two men saw Hoffa, recognized him, and stopped to chat with him briefly and to shake his hand. Hoffa also made a call to Linteau in which he again complained that the men were late. Linteau gave the time of his call from Hoffa as 3:30 p.m., but the FBI suspected that it must have been earlier, based on the timing of other phone calls from Linteau's office from around that time. The FBI estimated that Hoffa left the location without a struggle around 2:45–2:50 p.m. One witness reported seeing Hoffa in the back of a maroon "Lincoln or Mercury" car with three other people.

=== Investigation ===
At 7 a.m. the next day, Hoffa's wife called her son and daughter to say that their father had not come home. At 7:20 a.m., Linteau went to the Machus Red Fox and found Hoffa's unlocked car in the parking lot, but there was no sign of Hoffa, nor any indication of what had happened to him. Linteau called the police, who later arrived at the scene. The Michigan State Police were also brought in, and the FBI was alerted. At 6 p.m., Hoffa's son James filed a missing-person report. The Hoffa family offered a $200,000 reward for any information about his disappearance. The primary piece of physical evidence obtained in the investigation was a maroon 1975 Mercury Marquis Brougham, which belonged to Anthony Giacalone's son Joseph. The car had been borrowed earlier that day by Charles "Chuckie" O'Brien to deliver fish. O'Brien was Hoffa's foster son, but relations between them had soured in the years preceding Hoffa's disappearance. Investigators and Hoffa's family suspected that O'Brien had a role in Hoffa's disappearance. On August 21, police dogs identified Hoffa's scent in the car.

Giacalone and Provenzano, who denied having scheduled a meeting with Hoffa, were found not to have been near the restaurant that afternoon. According to Time, Provenzano was seen fraternizing with local union members in Hoboken, although he told investigators that he was playing cards with Stephen Andretta, Thomas Andretta's brother, in Union City, New Jersey, the day that Hoffa disappeared. Despite extensive surveillance and bugging, investigators found that the Mafia members were generally unwilling to talk about Hoffa's disappearance, even in private. On December 4, 1975, a federal investigator in Detroit testified in court before presiding Judge James Paul Churchill that a witness had identified three New Jersey men as having participated "in the abduction and murder of James R. Hoffa". The three men were close associates of Provenzano: Thomas Andretta, Salvatore Briguglio, and his brother Gabriel Briguglio.

In October 1975, Michigan Attorney General Frank J. Kelley went to Waterford Township to supervise an expedition to locate and exhume Hoffa's remains. The search (which was unsuccessful) was triggered by "a tip from an unnamed informer who said a group of Mafiosi wanted Hoffa's body found". After years of investigation involving numerous law enforcement agencies, including the FBI, officials have not reached a definitive conclusion as to Hoffa's fate or who was involved. Hoffa's wife, Josephine, died on September 12, 1980, and is interred at White Chapel Memorial Cemetery in Troy, Michigan. On December 9, 1982, Hoffa was declared legally dead as of July 30, 1982, by Oakland County, Michigan Probate Judge Norman R. Barnard. In 1989, Kenneth Walton, the agent in charge of the FBI's Detroit office, told The Detroit News: "I'm comfortable I know who did it, but it's never going to be prosecuted because we would have to divulge informants, confidential sources." In 2001, the FBI matched DNA from Hoffa's hair, taken from a brush, with a strand of hair found in Joseph Giacalone's car, but it is possible that Hoffa had traveled in the car on a different day.

On June 16, 2006, the Detroit Free Press published the entire "Hoffex Memo", a 56-page report prepared by the FBI for a January 1976 briefing on the case at the FBI headquarters in Washington. Although not claiming conclusively to establish the specifics of his disappearance, the memo records a belief that Hoffa was murdered at the behest of organized crime figures, who regarded his efforts to regain power in the Teamsters as a threat to their control of the union's pension fund. The Hoffex Memo contains a conclusion, based on evidence, that Chuckie O'Brien (who was described by FBI investigators as a "habitual liar") was driving Joseph Giacalone's maroon 1975 Mercury with license TMS-416 on the day of the disappearance and that Hoffa was seated in the right rear seat of the car. His body scent was located by police dogs, and a piece of his hair was recovered from the back seat. A pump-action 12-gauge shotgun was seized from the trunk of the car, and numerous .22 and .38 caliber bullets were found in the glove compartment. As of 2021, digs were still periodically conducted in the Detroit area in search of Hoffa's body, but a common theory among experts is that the body was cremated.

=== Claims and developments ===
==== Crime historians and investigators ====
There is wide agreement among crime historians and investigators that Hoffa was murdered on the order of his enemies in the Mafia. However, key details remain either unknown or unprovable, and this has ensured that no individuals have ever been charged in relation to the case. In discussing potential motives, both the 1976 Hoffex Memo and scholarship prior to its release focus on Mafia opposition to Hoffa's plans to regain the Teamsters' leadership and the threat Hoffa posed to the Mafia's control over the union's pension fund. The Hoffex Memo noted that Provenzano was not senior enough to order a Mafia hit, though it did not rule out the possibility that his or someone else's personal vendetta against Hoffa was a motive. Scott Burnstein, a crime historian and journalist, argued in 2019 that Provenzano's only role in the case was to act as a lure.

Dan Moldea mentioned the possibility that Hoffa had retaliated against his Mafia opponents by co-operating with investigations against them. The Hoffex Memo includes this as a possible motivation for murder. Vincent Piersante, the state government's former chief investigator in the Hoffa case, doubted that Hoffa could have seriously threatened the Mafia in this way, saying that any incriminating information Hoffa could reveal would either incriminate himself as well, or concern crimes that were outside of the statute of limitations. Piersante suggested that the killing was accidental, and that the men who were sent to meet Hoffa were only meant to be "insultingly low-level messengers". He argued that Hoffa had no realistic prospects for a comeback, that the disappearance did not share the usual characteristics of a Mafia hit, and that it risked encouraging action against organized crime (as indeed happened). This theory did not gain wide acceptance among criminologists.

In his 1991 book Hoffa, Arthur A. Sloane said that the most common theory of FBI investigators was that Russell Bufalino was the mob boss who ordered the murder, and Salvatore Briguglio, his brother Gabriel Briguglio, Thomas Andretta and Charles "Chuckie" O'Brien were the men who lured Hoffa away from the restaurant. The theory is that O'Brien was used as an "unwitting dupe" to lure Hoffa away, because Hoffa was suspicious of Provenzano and would not have entered the car unless there was a familiar figure present. A version of that theory is that O'Brien picked Hoffa up from the Machus Red Fox parking lot, and Hoffa was either killed in the car or driven to an unspecified location to be killed. Keith Corbett, a former U.S. Prosecuting Attorney, has since suggested that the Mafia would have considered O'Brien too unreliable to be entrusted with a role in such a high-profile murder. He instead suggested that Vito "Billy" Giacalone was the figure familiar to Hoffa.

The location of the murder is also unknown, but any violence in the restaurant parking lot would have easily attracted witnesses. Therefore, the Hoffex Memo suspects Hoffa was lured away to a different murder location. James Buccellato, a professor of Criminology and Criminal Justice at Northern Arizona University, suggested in 2017 that it was likely that Hoffa was murdered a mile away from the restaurant at the house of Carlo Licata, the son of the mobster Nick Licata. Sloane listed a local waste incinerator and a landfill in Jersey City as possible locations where the body was taken; the latter is also supported by Dan Moldea. Buccellato listed two waste incinerators and a crematorium, all in the Detroit area. He doubted the body had been transported a long distance: "It's just not practical." The Hoffex Memo similarly said: "If the Detroit LCN was used to assist in the disappearance, it is unknown why the body would be transported back to New Jersey when Detroit Organized Crime people have proven in the past that they are capable of taking care of such things."

==== Other accounts and speculation ====
In the book I Heard You Paint Houses: Frank "The Irishman" Sheeran and the Closing of the Case on Jimmy Hoffa (2004), author Charles Brandt writes that Frank Sheeran, an alleged professional killer for the mob and a longtime friend of Hoffa, confessed to killing him. According to the book, Sheeran claims O'Brien drove him, Hoffa, and fellow mobster Sal Briguglio to a house in Detroit. The house belonged to an elderly widow who was lured out of her house, making it an implausible location for law enforcement to suspect. Sheeran claims he shot Hoffa dead at that house. Sheeran then claimed Hoffa's body was taken to a crematorium in another state and cremated. Other evidence refutes Sheeran's claims. The truthfulness of the book, including the parts about Sheeran's confessions to killing Hoffa, has been disputed by "The Lies of the Irishman", an article in Slate by Bill Tonelli, and "Jimmy Hoffa and 'The Irishman': A True Crime Story?" by Harvard Law School Professor Jack Goldsmith, which appeared in The New York Review of Books. Buccellato doubts that the Mafia would have entrusted an Irish American with this role and also believes that Hoffa would have refused to travel that far from the restaurant.

Hoffa's body was rumored to be buried in Giants Stadium. In a 2004 episode of the Discovery Channel show MythBusters, "Buried in Concrete", the locations in the stadium in which Hoffa was rumored to be buried were scanned with a ground-penetrating radar. It was intended to reveal if any disturbances indicated a human body had been buried there, but no trace of any human remains was found. In addition, no human remains were found when Giants Stadium was demolished in 2010. In one of his jailhouse confessions published in a biography released after his death in 2006, Richard Kuklinski claimed that he was part of a four-man team who kidnapped and murdered Hoffa. Former FBI agent Robert Garrity, who worked on the Hoffa case, dismissed Kuklinski's claims as a hoax. Other authorities have also stated that Kuklinski's involvement in Hoffa's disappearance is unlikely.

In 2006 a horse farm owned by Teamsters official Rolland McMaster at the time of Hoffa's disappearance was searched by the FBI for a period of two weeks, with the total operation cost reaching $250,000. The search was brought on by a tip received from federal detainee Donovan Wells, who had lived with McMaster on the farm. He told the FBI that on the day of Hoffa's disappearance he witnessed seeing a number of cars on the farm, which a short time later were gone. McMaster denied any involvement in Hoffa's murder and stated that he was away on union business in Indiana at the time. In 2012, Roseville, Michigan, police took samples from the ground under a suburban Detroit driveway after a person reported having witnessed the burial of a body there around the time of Hoffa's 1975 disappearance. Tests by Michigan State University anthropologists found no evidence of human remains.

In January 2013, the reputed gangster Tony Zerilli implied that Hoffa was originally buried in a shallow grave, with plans to move his remains later to a second location. Zerilli said the plans were abandoned and Hoffa's remains lay in a field in northern Oakland County, Michigan, not far from the restaurant in which he had been last seen. Zerilli denied any responsibility for or association with Hoffa's disappearance. On June 17, 2013, investigating the Zerilli information, the FBI was led to a property in Oakland Township, in northern Oakland County, which was owned by Detroit mob boss Jack Tocco. After three days, the FBI called off the dig. No human remains were found, and the case remains open. Thomas Andretta, who died in 2019, and his brother Stephen, who reportedly died of cancer in 2000, were named by the FBI as suspects. Both were New Jersey Teamsters and reputed Genovese crime family mob associates. The FBI called Thomas Andretta a "trusted associate of Anthony Provenzano; reported to be involved in the disappearance of Hoffa".

In an April 2019 interview with DJ Vlad, the former Colombo crime family capo Michael Franzese stated that he was certain that Hoffa's disappearance had been mob-related. He said he was aware of the location of Hoffa's body and of the identity of his shooter, and had tapes that revealed details of his disappearance. When pressed for information on Hoffa's body, Franzese said, "I can tell you that it's wet, that's for sure", and "Upon good information, again, I think I know who the real shooter was; still alive today, in prison." In a 2018 interview with Value Entertainment, Franzese also makes the "it's wet" claim and adds that "it's deep". He also claims that he has in his possession a recorded tape that "spells everything out" and that he might release this at a later date. In a deathbed statement, a landfill worker claimed to have buried Hoffa's body in a steel drum, 15 feet below the surface in a landfill beneath the Pulaski Skyway in Jersey City, New Jersey. In October 2021, the FBI obtained a warrant and completed a site survey of the landfill. In July 2022, the FBI announced that "nothing of evidentiary value was discovered" from the survey.

== Legacy ==
Hoffa's legacy remains controversial. Arthur Sloane, who wrote a 1991 book on Hoffa's life, stated that many were polarised over Hoffa being "a kind of latter-day Al Capone... (or) hugely successful in improving working conditions for [his truck-driver constituents]." In 1995, a memorial service for Hoffa was conducted by his family. In 2023, a historical marker was erected in his home state of Indiana by the Indiana Historical Bureau, Clay County Historical Society, and the International Brotherhood of Teamsters.

=== In film and fiction ===
Hoffa has been portrayed by:

- Robert Blake (1983) (Blood Feud) (TV Miniseries)
- Tom Bosley (1984) (The Jesse Owens Story) (TV Movie)
- Trey Wilson (1985) (Robert Kennedy and His Times) (TV Miniseries)
- Jack Nicholson (1992) (Hoffa)
- Thomas Wagner (1993) (Marilyn & Bobby: Her Final Affair) (TV Movie)
- Al Pacino (2019) (The Irishman)

In the film F.I.S.T. (1978), Sylvester Stallone plays Johnny Kovak, a character based on Hoffa. In the Sergio Leone film Once Upon a Time in America (1984), Treat Williams' character, syndicalist James Conway O'Donnell, was inspired by Hoffa. In the parody film Naked Gun 33 1/3: The Final Insult (1994), a file folder labeled "Location of Jimmy Hoffa's body" is prominently displayed in a cabinet during the sperm bank and fertility clinic scene. "Don't Tug on Superman's Cape", sixth episode of the third season of Lois & Clark: The New Adventures of Superman (1995), features a wealthy couple collecting unique objects. Among them is a concrete block with a hand sticking out. They claim it to be Hoffa's body. Author James Ellroy features a fictional historical version of Hoffa in the Underworld USA Trilogy novels as an important secondary character, most prominently in the novels American Tabloid (1995) and The Cold Six Thousand (2001). In the comedy film Bruce Almighty (2003), the titular character uses powers endowed by God to manifest Hoffa's body in order to procure a story interesting enough to reclaim his career in the news industry. In the comedy series Everybody Hates Chris (2005), Rochelle, while admonishing her husband Julius about keeping a credit card secret from her for 15 years, asks increasingly suspicious questions about himself with the penultimate question being where Jimmy Hoffa was buried.

== See also ==
- List of people who disappeared
- List of people pardoned or granted clemency by the president of the United States

== Bibliography ==
- The Strange Disappearance of Jimmy Hoffa, by Charles Ashman and Rebecca Sobel, 1976, Manor Books, New York.
- I Heard You Paint Houses: Frank "The Irishman" Sheeran and the Inside Story of the Mafia, the Teamsters, and the Last Ride of Jimmy Hoffa [Paperback], by Charles Brandt
- The Teamsters, by Steven Brill, 1978, Simon & Schuster, New York, ISBN 0-671-22771-8.
- Hoffa! Ten Angels Swearing, by Jim Clay, 1965, Beaverdam Books, Beaverdam, Va.
- Mafia Kingfish: Carlos Marcello and the Assassination of John F. Kennedy, by John H. Davis, 1989, McGraw-Hill, New York.
- Hoffa, by Ken Englade, 1992, Harper Paperbacks, New York, ISBN 0-06-100613-0 (Novelization based on David Mamet's screenplay of the 1992 film by 20th Century Fox).
- The Trials of Jimmy Hoffa: An Autobiography, by James R. Hoffa as told to Donald I. Rogers, 1970, Henry Regnery, Chicago, LCCN 72--95364.
- Hoffa: The Real Story, by James R. Hoffa as told to Oscar Fraley, 1975, Stein and Day, New York, ISBN 978-0-8128-1885-7.
- Hoffa and the Underworld, by Paul Jacobs, Dissent, vol. 6, no. 4 (Autumn 1959), pp. 435–445.
- The State of the Unions, by Paul Jacobs, 1963, Atheneum, New York.
- Hoffa and the Teamsters: A Study of Union Power, by Ralph James and Estelle James, 1965, Van Nostrand, New York.
- The Enemy Within: The McClellan Committee's Crusade Against Jimmy Hoffa and Corrupt Labor Unions, by Robert F. Kennedy, 1960, Harper and Brothers, New York.
- Jimmy Hoffa's Hot, by John Bartlow Martin, 1959, Fawcett Publications, Greenwich, Conn.
- The Hoffa Wars: Teamsters, Rebels, Politicians and the Mob, 1978, first edition, by Dan Moldea, Paddington Press, New York and London, ISBN 0-448-22684-7.
  - The Hoffa Wars: Teamsters, Rebels, Politicians and the Mob, 1993, second edition, by Dan Moldea, SPI, New York.
- Tentacles of Power: The Story of Jimmy Hoffa, by Clark Mollenhoff, 1965, World Publishing Company, Cleveland and New York.
- Kennedy Justice, by Victor Navasky, 1971, Atheneum, New York.
- Hoffa in Tennessee: The Chattanooga Trial That Brought Down an Icon, by Maury Nicely, 2019, University of Tennessee Press.
- Vendetta: Bobby Kennedy Versus Jimmy Hoffa (2016) by James Neff, excerpt
- Mob Lawyer, by Frank Ragano and Selwyn Raab, 1994, Charles Scribner's Sons, ISBN 0-684-19568-2.
- All-American Mobster, by Charles Rappleye and Ed Becker, [about John Roselli] Barricade Books, 1995, ISBN 1-56980-027-8.
- Out of the Jungle: Jimmy Hoffa and the Remaking of the American Working Class, by Thaddeus Russell, 2001, Alfred A. Knopf, New York, ISBN 0-375-41157-7.
- The Fall and Rise of Jimmy Hoffa, by Walter Sheridan, 1972, Saturday Review Press, New York.
- Hoffa, by Arthur A. Sloane, 1991, MIT Press, Boston, ISBN 0-262-19309-4.
- The Ominous Ear, by Bernard Spindel, 1968, Award House, New York.
- Watergate: The Hidden History, by Lamar Waldron, 2012, Counterpoint, Berkeley, California.
- Desperate Bargain: Why Jimmy Hoffa Had To Die, by Lester Velie, 1977. Reader's Digest Press. ISBN 9780883491560
- Crossing Hoffa: A Teamster's Story, by Steven J. Harper, 2007. Borealis Books.

Preceded by David Daniel Beck	President of the International Brotherhood of Teamsters; 1957–1971	Succeeded by Frank Edward Fitzsimmons
