= Rebecca Faulkenberry =

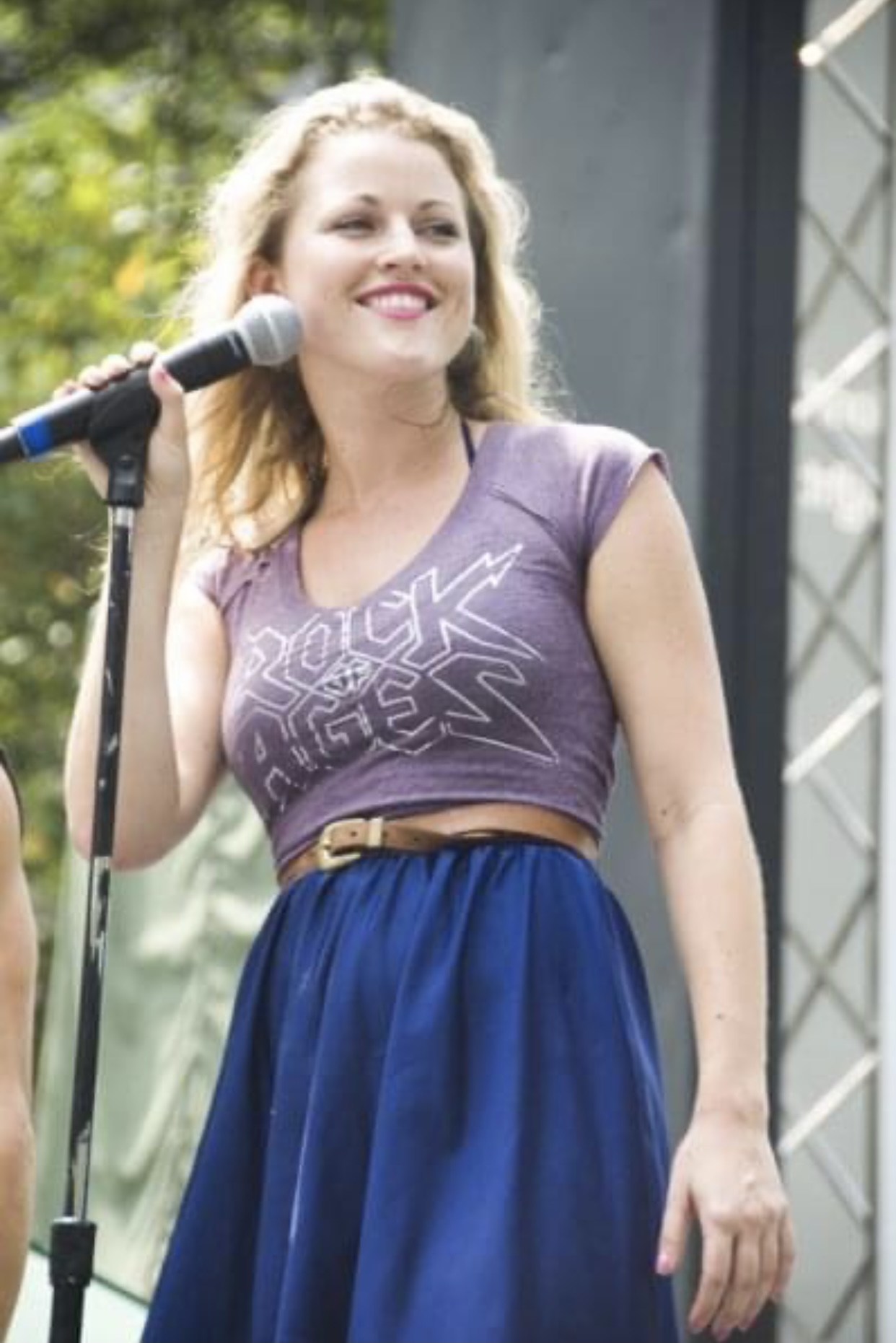
- Faulkenberry in concert

Background information
- Born: Woodlands, Texas, USA
- Occupations: Actress, singer
- Years active: 2002–present

Rebecca Faulkenberry is a Bermudian singer and actress who has appeared on Broadway, in the West End and on screen. She has performed in Spider-Man: Turn Off the Dark, Rock of Ages and The Irishman. Since 2026, she has appeared in the role of Rachel in MJ The Musical.

== Early life ==
Faulkenberry was born in Texas and raised in Bermuda. She moved back to the U.S. to attend the Connecticut boarding school Choate Rosemary Hall and Indiana University before completing a masters at Royal Conservatoire of Scotland.

== Career ==
=== Theatre ===
Faulkenberry made her West End debut in High School Musical, in 2008, and went on to star in High School Musical 2 before going on the US tour of the show. Her Broadway debut followed in 2011 as the female lead, Sherrie, with Rock of Ages following her role on the Rock of Ages national tour. After a nine-month stay with the show, she left Rock of Ages to join Spider-Man: Turn Off the Dark in 2011 in the lead role of Mary-Jane. In 2017 she starred as Nancy in Tim Minchin and Danny Rubin's Tony-nominated musical Groundhog Day. In June 2026, she returned to Broadway, appearing as Rachel in MJ The Musical.

=== Film and television ===
Faulkenberry is known for guest-starring roles in Madam Secretary, Blue Bloods, Cupertino, The Blacklist and Instinct. She appeared as Barbara Hoffa alongside Al Pacino in Martin Scorsese's The Irishman.

== Filmography ==
=== Film ===
Year	Title	Role
2017	Cut Shoot Kill	Nicole Heally
2019	The Irishman	Barbara Hoffa
2021	Martin Eden	Edith Olney

=== Television ===
Year	Title	Role	Notes
2009	Doctors	Jenny Beaumont	Episode: "Musical Bumps"
2010	The Tonight Show with Jay Leno	Sherrie	Rock of Ages performance
2014	The Heart, She Holler	Constance	Episode: "Groaning Amore"
2016	I Love You... But I Lied	Laura	Episode: "Hardcore"
2017	Madam Secretary	Meghan Pearl	Episode: "Minefield"
2019	Instinct	Candace Rego	2 episodes: "Manhunt" & "Go Figure"
2019	Blue Bloods	Misty Kaye	Episode: "Behind the Smile"
2023	The Blacklist	Paige	Episode: "The Dockery Affair"
2026	Cupertino	Abby Roby	Episode: "Harper"

=== Theatre ===
Year	Production	Role	Theatre
2008	High School Musical on Stage!	Sharpay Evans	Hammersmith Apollo
2008	High School Musical 2: On Stage!	Sharpay Evans	Fox Theatre Atlanta
2011	Rock of Ages	Sherrie	Helen Hayes Theatre
2011–2012	Spider-Man: Turn Off the Dark	Mary-Jane Watson	Foxwoods Theatre
2017	Groundhog Day	Nancy	August Wilson Theatre
2026	MJ the Musical	Rachel	Neil Simon Theatre
