= Patrick Gallo =

American actor (born 1973)

- Born: February 26, 1973 (age 53); Buffalo, New York, U.S.
- Occupation: Actor

Patrick Gallo (born February 26, 1973) is an American actor. He portrayed Anthony Giacalone in Martin Scorsese's The Irishman.

== Filmography ==
=== Film ===
Year	Title	Role	Notes
1996	Rabble Boys	Jacky	
2001	The Comedy Team of Pete & James	Pete Bodyguard #3	
2003	American Wedding	Dress Salesman	
2003	Malibooty!	Taxi Driver	Direct-to-video
2006	I'll Believe You	Officer Nick Senna	
2018	YouChoose	Interviewer / Leonard	
2019	The Irishman	Anthony Giacalone	

=== Television ===
Year	Title	Role	Notes
2002	Charmed	Fisherman #1	Episode: "A Witch's Tail: Part 2"
2002, 2003	Grounded for Life	Bob	2 episodes
2003	ER	Rudolph Massey	Episode: "Insurrection"
2003	Oliver Beene	Lou	Episode: "Nudie Mag"
2003	NYPD Blue	Roy Pardee	Episode: "Marine Life"
2003	Cold Case	Anthony DeSica (1964)	Episode: "A Time to Hate"
2004	Reno 911!	Tequila Guy / Angry Bettor	2 episodes
2004	Huff	Chico	Episode: "Assault & Pepper"
2012	Boardwalk Empire	Franco	Episode: "A Man, a Plan..."
2014	Taxi Brooklyn	Frederic Talifero	Episode: "Ambush"
2016	Unforgettable	Shane Burton	Episode: "Bad Company"
2017	The Deuce	Clifford	Episode: "Pilot"
2019	When They See Us	Detective Taglioni	Episode: "Part One"
2022	The Offer	Mario Puzo	10 episodes
2024	Curb Your Enthusiasm	Stu Grossbard	Episode: "The Dream Scheme"
