= Anthony Provenzano =

American gangster (1917–1988)

- Born: May 7, 1917; New York City, New York, U.S.
- Died: December 12, 1988 (aged 71); Lompoc, California, U.S.
- Resting place: St. Joseph's Cemetery, Hackensack, New Jersey, U.S.
- Other name: "Tony Pro"
- Spouse: Marie-Paule Migneron Provenzano (m. 1961) (second wife)
- Children: 4
- Relatives: Nunzio Provenzano (brother)
- Allegiance: Genovese crime family
- Convictions: Extortion (1963); Murder (1978); Conspiracy to violate the anti-kickback statute (1978); Racketeering (1979)
- Penalty: Seven years' imprisonment (1963); Life imprisonment (1978); Four years' imprisonment (1978); 20 years' imprisonment (1979)

Anthony Provenzano (May 7, 1917 – December 12, 1988), also known as Tony Pro, was an American mobster who was a powerful caporegime in the Genovese crime family, New Jersey faction. Provenzano was known for his associations with Jimmy Hoffa due to Provenzano's job as the International Brotherhood of Teamsters president for Local 560 in Union City, New Jersey.

== Early life ==
Provenzano was born on May 7, 1917, on the Lower East Side of Manhattan, the fourth of six children to Sicilian immigrants Rosario and Josephine Provenzano. At age 15, he quit Public School 114 and went to work as a ten-dollar-a-week helper at the H.P. Welch Trucking Company. Three years later he became a driver.

== Career ==
Provenzano became employed by Teamsters Local 560 in Union City, New Jersey, as a business agent between 1948 and 1958, as the president between 1958 and May 1966, and as secretary-treasurer between November 24, 1975, and June 1978. Provenzano was a resident of Clifton, New Jersey and Hallandale, Florida. In 1959, Provenzano cited the Fifth Amendment 44 times before a Senate racketeering committee, for which Robert F. Kennedy was counsel.

In June 1961, Teamsters Local 560 secretary-treasurer Anthony Castellito traveled to Upstate New York to meet with Salvatore Briguglio, a mob-associated loan shark. According to federal government reports, Briguglio and Harold Konigsberg murdered Castellito. Subsequently, in August 1961, Provenzano's brother Sal was appointed to the position of trustee, formerly occupied by Castellitto; Briguglio was appointed to the position of business agent in September 1961; Provenzano's other brother Nunzio was appointed to the position of business agent in February 1963.

On November 15, 1960, Provenzano was indicted in the District of New Jersey for extortion for the demand and receipt of "labor peace" payoffs from the Dorn Transportation Company between 1952 and 1959. On July 12, 1963, Provenzano was convicted of extortion and sentenced to seven years' imprisonment; he served four-and-a-half years, incarcerated between May 1966 and 1970. Although Provenzano had once been a friend of Teamsters Union director Jimmy Hoffa, he had since become an enemy after a reported feud when both were in federal prison at United States Penitentiary, Lewisburg in Pennsylvania in the 1960s.

Hoffa planned to regain the leadership of the union, but was met with opposition from several members of the Mafia. In 1973 and 1974, Hoffa asked Provenzano for his support to regain his former position, but Provenzano refused and threatened Hoffa by reportedly saying he would pull out his guts and kidnap his grandchildren. At least two of Provenzano's union opponents had been murdered, and others who had spoken out against him had been assaulted.

On July 30, 1975, Hoffa was to meet Provenzano and Anthony Giacalone at 2:00 p.m. at the Machus Red Fox restaurant in Bloomfield Township, a Detroit suburb; Hoffa was never seen again. Giacalone and Provenzano, who denied having scheduled a meeting with Hoffa, were found not to have been near the restaurant that afternoon. While one account cited by Time states that Provenzano was seen fraternizing with local union members in Hoboken, New Jersey, according to the Associated Press, Provenzano told investigators that he was playing cards with Stephen Andretta, Thomas Andretta's brother, in Union City (which borders Hoboken), on the afternoon that Hoffa disappeared. Ten weeks after Hoffa's disappearance, President Richard Nixon made his first public appearance since his resignation, during which he golfed with Frank Fitzsimmons, president of the International Brotherhood of Teamsters, and Provenzano. On December 4, 1975, a federal investigator in Detroit said in a court hearing, presided over by James Paul Churchill, that a witness had identified three New Jersey men who had participated "in the abduction and murder of James R. Hoffa." The three men, close associates of Provenzano, were Salvatore Briguglio, his brother Gabriel Briguglio, and Thomas Andretta.

On December 9, 1975, Provenzano was indicted in the Southern District of New York, along with Anthony Bentro and Lawrence Paladino, for conspiracy to violate the anti-kickback statute for a proposed $2.3 million pension-fund loan from the Utica Teamsters Benefit Fund for the renovation of the Woodstock Hotel; in July 1978, he was convicted of these charges and sentenced to four years in prison. On June 23, 1976, Provenzano was indicted in Ulster County, New York, along with Briguglio and Konigsberg, on charges of conspiracy and murder in connection to the 1961 death of Anthony Castellitto. On June 14, 1978, Provenzano was convicted of murder, while the conspiracy to commit murder count was dismissed, and was sentenced to life imprisonment in Kingston, New York, exactly one week later. On February 22, 1979, Provenzano was indicted in the District of New Jersey, along with Gabriel Briguglio, Stephen and Thomas Andretta and Ralph Pellecchia on RICO charges in the Seatrain Labor Peace Payoffs case. On May 25, 1979, he was convicted of these charges, and, on July 10, 1979, he was sentenced to 20 years' imprisonment.

== Death ==
On December 12, 1988, Provenzano died of a heart attack at Lompoc Federal Penitentiary in Lompoc, California, aged 71. A month before his death, he was treated for congestive heart failure. He was buried at St. Joseph's Cemetery in Hackensack, New Jersey. He left his estate to his French-Canadian second wife, Marie-Paule Migneron Provenzano.

== In film and fiction ==
In the film Hoffa (1992), Armand Assante's character Carl "Dally" D'Allesandro, was inspired by Provenzano. Provenzano is portrayed by English actor Stephen Graham in the film The Irishman (2019).

== See also ==
- Maurice Edelbaum, one of Provenzano's lawyers
