= Giuseppe Provenzano =

Giuseppe Provenzano may refer to:

- Giuseppe Provenzano (Italian politician, born 1946)
- Giuseppe Provenzano (Italian politician born, 1982)
