= Nunzio Provenzano =

American mobster

Nunzio "Nunzi Pro" Provenzano
- Born: February 24, 1923
- Died: May 8, 1997 (aged 74)
- Occupations: Teamsters Union official, Soldier
- Relatives: Anthony Provenzano (brother)
- Status: Convicted
- Allegiance: Genovese crime family
- Criminal charges: Conspiracy, Attempted Grand Larceny, RICO violations (wrongful demand and receipt of "labor peace" payments)
- Penalty: 2 to 4 years imprisonment (1963); 10 years imprisonment (1981)

Details
- Imprisoned at: August 1966 – February 1969; July 1981 onwards (until death)

Nunzio "Nunzi Pro" Provenzano (February 24, 1923 – May 8, 1997) was a Genovese crime family soldier in his older brother Anthony Provenzano's crew, which controlled Teamsters Union Local 560 in New Jersey. Both Provenzanos served as officers in the union local, including president, secretary, and business agent.

Provenzano, was employed by Local 560 as a business agent between 1963 and August 6, 1966, as a clerk between 1969 and 1970, again as a business agent between 1970 and January 25, 1973, as secretary treasurer between January 25, 1973 and November 24, 1975, and as President between November 24, 1975 and July 1981.

On December 26, 1961, Provenzano was indicted in New York, along with Salvatore Briguglio and a third defendant, on charges of conspiracy and attempted grand larceny for a scheme to demand "labor peace" payments from the Braun Company and Hubert J. Braun, Jr. during December 1961. On January 29, 1963, he was convicted of attempted grand larceny, and, on March 5, 1963, he was sentenced to a prison term of two to four years. He served this sentence in New York between approximately August 1966 and February 1969.

On September 4, 1980, Provenzano was indicted in the District of New Jersey, along with Irving Cotler, his brother Salvatore Provenzano, and Michael Sciarra, for RICO violations for the wrongful demand and receipt of "labor peace" payments from four trucking companies between 1971 and 1980. On May 5, 1981, Nunzio Provenzano was convicted on these charges, and, on July 7, 1981, he was sentenced to 10 years imprisonment. His brother Salvatore was acquitted.

On May 8, 1997, Nunzio Provenzano died of natural causes at age 74.
