= Anthony Giacalone =

American mobster (1919–2001)

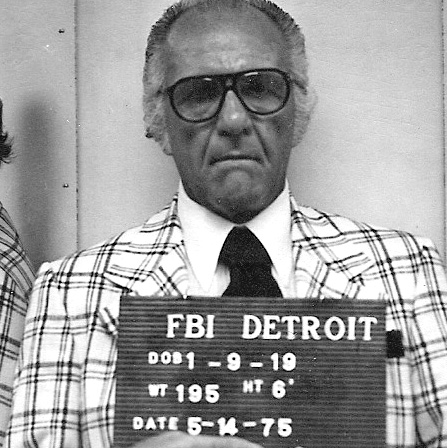
- Giacalone's May 14, 1975 FBI mugshot
- Born: Anthony Joseph Giacalone; January 9, 1919; Detroit, Michigan, U.S.
- Died: February 23, 2001 (aged 82); Detroit, Michigan, U.S.
- Resting place: Holy Sepulchre Cemetery, Southfield, Michigan
- Other names: "Tony Jack"; "Tony Jocks"
- Occupation: Mobster
- Known for: Links with Jimmy Hoffa and his disappearance
- Relatives: Vito Giacalone (brother)
- Allegiance: Detroit Partnership
- Conviction: Tax evasion (1976)
- Penalty: 10 years' imprisonment

Anthony Joseph Giacalone (January 9, 1919 – February 23, 2001), also known as Tony Jack, was an American mobster in Detroit who served as a capo, and later as a street boss, in the Detroit Partnership. In terms of Mafia organization, he was listed by the Federal Bureau of Investigation (FBI) in 1963 as one of the “Big Men” and deemed an administrator or heir apparent. He came to public notice during the 1970s investigations into the disappearance of Teamsters president Jimmy Hoffa, as he was one of two Mafia members – the other being Anthony Provenzano – that Hoffa had arranged to meet on the day he disappeared. In 1976, Giacalone was sentenced to 10 years in prison for tax evasion. He died of natural causes on February 23, 2001.

== Early life ==
Giacalone was born on January 9, 1919, on the Eastside of Detroit. Born to Sicilian immigrant parents, he was the oldest son of seven siblings. He often helped his father, Giacomo, sell produce from the back of a horse-drawn wagon in the Indian Village section of Detroit. He began to aspire to work in organized crime after seeing the wealth its leaders had, in contrast to the meager living his father earned. He particularly looked up to his father's relative Salvatore Catalanotte, a leading figure in Detroit's growing Italian underworld. Giacalone was charged with his first criminal offense at the age of 18, the first of multiple run-ins with the law.

== Criminal career ==
By the time he was in his 30s, he was working as a pickup man in the local numbers racket, run by Peter Licavoli, and as collector of delinquent gambling debts for Joe Zerilli. Both of these men were highly respected in local crime organizations and they helped protect Giacalone from the law. Between 1950 and 1952, he was arrested multiple times for various gambling offenses, but he avoided prosecution. In August 1954, he had his first conviction after 14 arrests. He was sentenced to 8 months in jail and ordered to pay court costs. After that stint in jail, he served another 7 days in jail for refusing to testify before the grand jury investigating gambling in the Detroit area.

On August 9, 1954, Giacalone was arrested for the bribery of a patrolman on the racket squad of the Detroit Police Department. Giacalone offered $200 a month in return for information regarding any possible gambling raids. He was sentenced to 8 months in jail in addition to a $500 fine. He was arrested for a similar offense in June 1963, bribing Lieutenant James W. Thomas with $50 a month to look the other way in regard to a numbers gambling operation. This arrest, his fifteenth, led to an investigation of his mafia-related activities. Giacalone was charged with bribery conspiracy, but was freed on $7,500 bond. This sudden conviction led Detroit Police Commissioner George Edwards to believe that Giacalone was not only the boss of the numbers racket in southeastern Michigan, but also the head of the Detroit Mafia. Edwards later testified in front of the Senate's permanent investigations subcommittee in October 1963 and identified Giacalone as the Mafia gambling boss of the Detroit area. In November 1963, Giacalone and his brother, Vito Giacalone, were indicted in a Washington tax evasion hearing. The brothers received over $40,000 as fake sales representatives of two companies also indicted in the testimony. Giacalone's hearing in 1964 for bribing Lt. Thomas caused quite a stir within the legal system. It was originally set for February 28, 1964, before being pushed later into 1965. Judge Joseph A. Gillis, who was assigned to Giacalone's case, felt that Edwards’ previous public assertions about Giacalone were not fair to his trial.

Giacalone was finally ordered to stand trial in July 1965 for his charges related to the bribery of Lt. Thomas. As of January 16, 1966, Giacalone had been arrested 15 times, and convicted only once, which was the bribery case that had been to court 41 times and heard by six judges, but still had not been to trial. This case took a turn in March 1966 when Lt. Thomas admitted to the jury that he had lied and given false testimony about where he had written reports about the alleged bribes from Giacalone. The next month, Giacalone's co-defendant, Harrison “Chink” Brown, had been dismissed due to lack of evidence about his involvement in the alleged bribe. Less than a week later, Giacalone and another co-defendant, Claude E. Williams, were found not guilty by a jury after a 2.5 hour deliberation. Lt. Thomas was ultimately suspended from his position with the Detroit Police Department, but he was later reinstated in July of that same year.

In July 1966, Giacalone along with Dominic P. “Fats” Corrado were arrested in Montreal due to entering Canada illegally. They were deported back to the United States shortly thereafter from Windsor and barred from the country. In May 1967, Giacalone agreed to answer four questions for George E. Bowles, the Grand Juror of Wayne County, in exchange for no jail time. The questions concerned any possible business Giacalone may have conducted with Paul Quaglia, a Detroit policeman. Giacalone refused to answer one of the questions and ultimately was indicted and spent a week in jail. In March 1968, Giacalone, with his brother Vito, was among 127 people arrested during a raid of a gambling operation in Detroit Two months later, they were also arraigned on charges regarding a large-scale loanshark racket, which included the conspiracy to extort. Only a week later, Giacalone was charged with more misdemeanor offenses regarding illegal gun possession. Although he was found guilty on these charges in August 1968, he only received a fine and probation because he was described as a “family man” in his defense. After Giacalone was found guilty of blackjack weapon possession in November 1968, he was held on a $5,000 bond and was sentenced to 4.5 to 5 years in prison the following January. Less than a week later in November, Giacalone was indicted with 11 other men on seven counts of federal offenses regarding their alleged loansharking operation; he was later found innocent with his brother in October 1969.

While Giacalone was free on bond regarding his blackjack charges, a warrant was issued in February 1969 for an alleged gambling operation in addition to bribery, though these charges were dropped in November 1969. The Giacalone brothers were indicted on three counts each of federal income tax evasion in January 1972. These charges were dismissed later that year in June, but this was overturned by the Circuit Court of Appeals in May 1973. The trials began in March 1974, and they were again acquitted the next month. About a year later in April 1975, Giacalone was again indicted for tax evasion between 1968 and 1971. In May 1975, Giacalone was arrested and indicted in Detroit for mail fraud and conspiracy, but he was later acquitted of these charges in September 1976.

=== The Hotel Gotham ===
The Luxurious Hotel Gotham was declared “the finest hotel in the country owned and operated by colored,” and figures like Jesse Owens, Jackie Robinson, and Sammy Davis Jr. filled the Gotham's long list of visitors. John White (one of the Gotham's owners) was a gambling man involved in alternative forms of earning money. Soon after its opening, the Gotham became known as “the fortress of the numbers racket in Detroit”. At this time, Tony Giacalone was Detroit's boss of the numbers racket; thus, it is hardly surprising that his unlisted telephone number was contained in White's personal directory. White's numbers operation was wildly successful because Giacalone and the Mafia supplied the daily lottery's winning number combinations, gambling paraphernalia, but most importantly protection from law enforcement and any other trouble. Giacalone himself was recorded on wire-tap bribing police officers for information on upcoming gambling raids at his establishments like the Gotham. Although this earned Giacalone 8 months in the Detroit House of Corrections and a $500 fine (roughly $5,000 today), it did little to hinder the progress of numbers operations like White's and rackets like Giacalone's.

The Gotham's penthouse, reserved exclusively for gambling, saw policemen, politicians, and other wealthy individuals come and go on a daily basis. Even after the Gotham officially closed for business in 1962, White's numbers operation continued. This served as an opportunity to conduct a Federal raid, which was carried out that November. Officials discovered, among many other things, that the Gotham raked in over $21 million annually (equivalent to $166 million today). Unfortunately for Federal officials, despite arresting and later convicting 41 people including John White, the only link uncovered between Giacalone and the Gotham was that of his phone number. This served little purpose to authorities other than to confirm what they already knew: the mafia assisted numbers operators in Detroit.

=== Hoffa disappearance ===
Giacalone gained national fame when his name blew up in newspapers nationwide in the summer of 1975, regarding the disappearance of labor union leader Jimmy Hoffa. Giacalone was allegedly supposed to meet with Hoffa on the day of his disappearance, but Giacalone denied this. Giacalone was quizzed by authorities for any connections to Hoffa's disappearance.

Prior to then, there had been growing tension between Hoffa and several Mafia members, who opposed his plans to return to prominence in the International Brotherhood of Teamsters. The latter included Giacalone, Anthony Provenzano and Giacalone's brother Vito. Despite the mounting strain between the two groups, it appears as though there were never any public displays of ill will or malicious intent despite his and his brother Vito's alleged involvement in a failed plot to rob a safe belonging to Hoffa in Washington D.C. On July 30, 1975, Hoffa, who had mentioned his plans to acquaintances and family members to meet with Giacalone and Provenzano at 2:00 p.m. at the Machus Red Fox restaurant parking lot in Bloomfield Township, a Detroit suburb; was never seen again. It has been posited that Giacalone may have been motivated by the fact that Hoffa would not acquiesce to Mafia demands and retire. Though Giacalone was suspected of being involved in a conspiracy to murder Hoffa, Giacalone and Provenzano, who denied having scheduled any such meeting or appointment with Hoffa, were found not to have been near the restaurant that afternoon.

=== Tax evasion conviction ===
Giacalone was indicted April 9, 1975, on four counts of tax evasion for the years 1968 through 1971. In May 1976, he was convicted on three counts of attempting to avoid paying over $103,000 in federal income taxes. In June 1976, Giacalone was sentenced to ten years in prison at FCI, Oxford, Wisconsin in addition to a $30,000 fine for tax evasion. He posted bond despite the Assistant United States attorney labeling him as a “danger to the community”.

== Death ==
Giacalone died on February 23, 2001, aged 82. He had been admitted to St. John's Hospital and Medical Center in Detroit for heart failure and complications arising from kidney disease. He was buried at Holy Sepulchre Cemetery in Southfield, Michigan.

== In popular culture ==
He was played by Patrick Gallo in Martin Scorsese's 2019 film The Irishman. In the film, Anthony Giacalone's character is more understated without a significant or essential role.
