= Robert De Niro filmography =

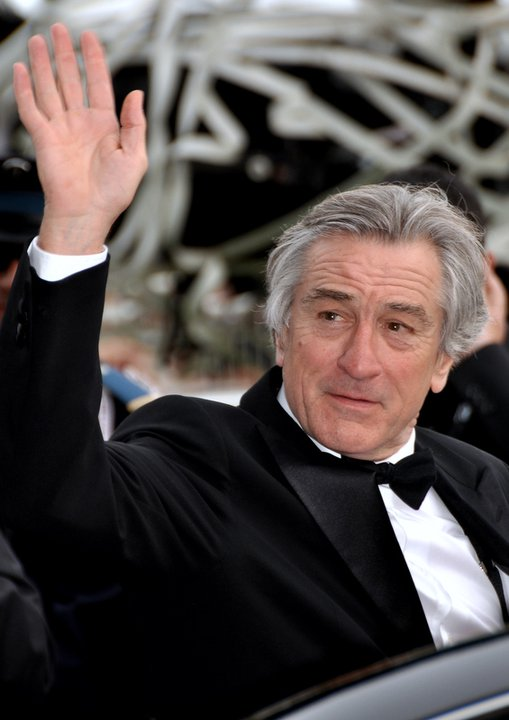
De Niro at the 2011 Cannes Film Festival.

Robert De Niro is an American actor and film producer. Widely considered to be one of the greatest and most influential actors of his generation, (Note: Attributed to multiple references.) he studied acting at HB Studio, Stella Adler Conservatory, and Lee Strasberg's Actors Studio. He is known for collaborations with director Martin Scorsese having starred in ten of his films since 1973. He has also acted in several films directed by Brian de Palma, Barry Levinson, and David O. Russell. He has received several accolades including two Academy Awards and a Golden Globe Award as well as nominations for eight BAFTA Awards. De Niro has received numerous honors including the AFI Life Achievement Award in 2003, the Kennedy Center Honors in 2009, the Cecil B. DeMille Award in 2011, the Presidential Medal of Freedom from U.S. president Barack Obama in 2016, and the Screen Actors Guild Life Achievement Award in 2019.

His first credited screen role was in De Palma's Greetings (1968). He collaborated with De Palma again on its sequel, Hi, Mom! (1970), as well as The Wedding Party (1969) and The Untouchables (1987)—the latter in which he portrayed Al Capone. De Niro's first collaboration with Scorsese was with the crime drama film Mean Streets (1973). De Niro has earned two Academy Awards: one for Best Supporting Actor for his role as Vito Corleone in Francis Ford Coppola's crime drama The Godfather Part II (1974) and the other for Best Actor portraying Jake LaMotta in Scorsese's drama Raging Bull (1980). De Niro was also Oscar-nominated for his roles as Travis Bickle the psychological drama Taxi Driver (1976), a steelworker turned soldier in the Vietnam War film The Deer Hunter (1978), a catatonic patient in the drama Awakenings (1990), a convicted criminal on the loose in the crime thriller Cape Fear (1991), a father with OCD in the romance drama Silver Linings Playbook (2012), and William King Hale in the historical drama Killers of the Flower Moon (2023).

Among De Niro's non-Oscar nominated performances in Scorsese films include New York, New York (1977), The King of Comedy (1983), Goodfellas (1990), Casino (1995), and The Irishman (2019). He took roles in John D. Hancock's Bang the Drum Slowly (1973), Bernardo Bertolucci's 1900 (1976), Elia Kazan's The Last Tycoon (1976), Ulu Grosbard's True Confessions (1981), Sergio Leone's Once Upon a Time in America (1984), Terry Gilliam's Brazil (1985), Roland Joffe's The Mission (1986), Alan Parker's Angel Heart, Irwin Winkler's Guilty by Suspicion (1991), Ron Howard's Backdraft (1991), Michael Caton-Jones's This Boy's Life (1993), Kenneth Branagh's Mary Shelley's Frankenstein (1995), Michael Mann's Heat (1995), Quentin Tarantino's Jackie Brown (1997), Alfonso Cuarón's Great Expectations (1998), John Frankenheimer's Ronin (1998), and Todd Phillips' Joker (2019).

De Niro has directed and starred in two films: the coming-of-age crime drama A Bronx Tale (1993) and the historical spy drama film The Good Shepherd (2006). He is also known for his roles in comedy films such as Analyze This (1999) and its 2002 sequel and Meet the Parents (2000), and reprised his role in the 2004 and 2010 sequels. He has also acted in comedy films such as Greetings (1968), The Wedding Party (1969), Bloody Mama (1970), Hi, Mom! (1970), Everybody's Fine (2009), Last Vegas (2013), The Big Wedding (2013), The Intern (2015), and Dirty Grandpa (2016).

On television, he has hosted Saturday Night Live thrice from 2002 to 2010. He portrayed Bernie Madoff in the HBO television film The Wizard of Lies (2017) for which he was nominated for the Primetime Emmy Award for Outstanding Lead Actor in a Limited or Anthology Series or Movie. He also was Emmy-nominated for his recurring guest role as Robert Mueller in Saturday Night Live (2019). He played a fictional former President of the United States in the Netflix limited series Zero Day (2025). On stage, he made his Broadway debut in the play Cuba and His Teddy Bear (1986).

Many of De Niro's films are considered classics of American cinema. Six of De Niro's films have been inducted into the United States National Film Registry by the Library of Congress as "culturally, historically, or aesthetically significant" as of 2023. Five films are featured on the American Film Institute's (AFI) list of the 100 greatest American films of all time. TimeOut magazine's list of 100 best movies included seven of De Niro's films, as chosen by actors in the industry. His line for the film Taxi Driver, "You talkin' to me?", was ranked number 10 on the American Film Institute's AFI's 100 Years...100 Movie Quotes.

== Acting credits ==
=== Film ===
Key
†	Denotes productions that have not yet been released

Year	Title	Functioned as			Director	Notes	Ref(s)
Year	Title	Actor	Producer	Role	Director	Notes	Ref(s)
1965	Three Rooms in Manhattan	Uncredited	No	Client at the Diner	Marcel Carné		
1968	The Young Wolves	Uncredited	No	Un Hippie Chez Popov	Marcel Carné		
1968	Greetings	Yes	No	Jon Rubin	Brian De Palma		
1969	The Wedding Party	Yes	No	Cecil	Brian De Palma		
1969	Sam's Song	Yes	No	Sam	Jordan Leondopoulos		
1970	Bloody Mama	Yes	No	Lloyd Barker	Roger Corman		
1970	Hi, Mom!	Yes	No	Jon Rubin	Brian De Palma		
1971	Jennifer on My Mind	Yes	No	Mardigian	Noel Black		
1971	Born to Win	Yes	No	Officer Danny	Ivan Passer		
1971	The Gang That Couldn't Shoot Straight	Yes	No	Mario Trantino	James Goldstone		
1973	Bang the Drum Slowly	Yes	No	Bruce Pearson	John D. Hancock		
1973	Mean Streets	Yes	No	John "Johnny Boy" Civello	Martin Scorsese		
1974	The Godfather Part II	Yes	No	Vito Corleone	Francis Ford Coppola		
1976	Taxi Driver	Yes	No	Travis Bickle	Martin Scorsese		
1976	1900	Yes	No	Alfredo Berlinghieri	Bernardo Bertolucci		
1976	The Last Tycoon	Yes	No	Monroe Stahr	Elia Kazan		
1977	New York, New York	Yes	No	Jimmy Doyle	Martin Scorsese		
1978	The Deer Hunter	Yes	No	Michael "Mike" Vronsky	Michael Cimino		
1980	Raging Bull	Yes	No	Jake LaMotta	Martin Scorsese		
1981	True Confessions	Yes	No	Monsignor Desmond "Des" Spellacy	Ulu Grosbard		
1982	The King of Comedy	Yes	No	Rupert Pupkin	Martin Scorsese		
1984	Once Upon a Time in America	Yes	No	David "Noodles" Aaronson	Sergio Leone		
1984	Falling in Love	Yes	No	Frank Raftis	Ulu Grosbard		
1985	Brazil	Yes	No	Archibald "Harry" Tuttle	Terry Gilliam		
1986	The Mission	Yes	No	Rodrigo Mendoza	Roland Joffé		
1987	Angel Heart	Yes	No	Louis Cyphre	Alan Parker		
1987	The Untouchables	Yes	No	Al Capone	Brian De Palma		
1988	Midnight Run	Yes	No	Jack Walsh	Martin Brest		
1989	Jacknife	Yes	No	Joseph "Jacknife" Megessey	David Jones		
1989	We're No Angels	Yes	Executive	Ned	Neil Jordan		
1990	Stanley & Iris	Yes	No	Stanley Everett Cox	Martin Ritt		
1990	Goodfellas	Yes	No	James "Jimmy The Gent" Conway	Martin Scorsese		
1990	Awakenings	Yes	No	Leonard Lowe	Penny Marshall		
1991	Guilty by Suspicion	Yes	No	David Merrill	Irwin Winkler		
1991	Backdraft	Yes	No	Donald "Shadow" Rimgale	Ron Howard		
1991	Cape Fear	Yes	No	Maximilian "Max" Cady	Martin Scorsese		
1992	Mistress	Yes	Yes	Evan M. Wright	Barry Primus		
1992	Night and the City	Yes	No	Harry Fabian	Irwin Winkler		
1993	Mad Dog and Glory	Yes	No	Wayne "Mad Dog" Dobie	John McNaughton		
1993	This Boy's Life	Yes	No	Dwight Hansen	Michael Caton-Jones		
1993	A Bronx Tale	Yes	Yes	Lorenzo Anello	Himself	Also director	
1994	Mary Shelley's Frankenstein	Yes	Associate	The Creature	Kenneth Branagh		
1995	One Hundred and One Nights	Yes	No	Le Mari de la Star-Fantasme en Croisière	Agnès Varda		
1995	Casino	Yes	No	Sam "Ace" Rothstein	Martin Scorsese		
1995	Heat	Yes	No	Neil McCauley	Michael Mann		
1996	The Fan	Yes	No	Gilbert "Gil" Renard	Tony Scott		
1996	Sleepers	Yes	No	Father Bobby Carillo	Barry Levinson		
1996	Marvin's Room	Yes	Yes	Dr. Wally	Jerry Zaks		
1997	Cop Land	Yes	No	Lieutenant Moe Tilden	James Mangold		
1997	Jackie Brown	Yes	No	Louis Gara	Quentin Tarantino		
1997	Wag the Dog	Yes	Yes	Conrad Brean	Barry Levinson		
1998	Great Expectations	Yes	No	Arthur Lustig	Alfonso Cuarón		
1998	Ronin	Yes	No	CIA Agent Sam Regazolli	John Frankenheimer		
1999	Analyze This	Yes	No	Paul Vitti	Harold Ramis		
1999	Flawless	Yes	No	Walter Koontz	Joel Schumacher		
2000	The Adventures of Rocky and Bullwinkle	Yes	Yes	Fearless Leader	Des McAnuff		
2000	Men of Honor	Yes	No	Chief Leslie William "Billy" Sunday	George Tillman Jr.		
2000	Meet the Parents	Yes	Yes	Jack Tiberius Byrnes	Jay Roach		
2001	15 Minutes	Yes	No	Detective Eddie Flemming	John Herzfeld		
2001	The Score	Yes	No	Nick Wells	Frank Oz		
2002	Showtime	Yes	No	Detective Mitch Preston	Tom Dey		
2002	City by the Sea	Yes	No	Vincent Anthony LaMarca	Michael Caton-Jones		
2002	Analyze That	Yes	No	Paul Vitti	Harold Ramis		
2004	Godsend	Yes	No	Dr. Richard Wells	Nick Hamm		
2004	Shark Tale	Yes	No	Don Lino	Bibo Bergeron, Vicky Jenson & Rob Letterman	Voice role	
2004	Meet the Fockers	Yes	Yes	Jack Tiberius Byrnes	Jay Roach		
2004	The Bridge of San Luis Rey	Yes	No	The Archbishop of Lima	Mary McGuckian		
2005	Hide and Seek	Yes	No	David Callaway / Charlie	John Polson		
2006	Arthur and the Invisibles	Yes	No	Emperor Sifrat XVI	Luc Besson	Voice role	
2006	The Good Shepherd	Yes	Yes	General Bill Sullivan	Himself	Also director	
2007	Stardust	Yes	No	Captain Shakespeare	Matthew Vaughn		
2008	What Just Happened	Yes	Yes	Ben	Barry Levinson		
2008	Righteous Kill	Yes	No	Detective Tom "Turk" Cowan	Jon Avnet		
2009	Everybody's Fine	Yes	No	Frank	Kirk Jones		
2010	Machete	Yes	No	Senator John McLaughlin	Ethan Maniquis & Robert Rodriguez		
2010	Stone	Yes	No	Jack Mabry	John Curran		
2010	Little Fockers	Yes	Yes	Jack Tiberius Byrnes	Paul Weitz		
2011	The Ages of Love	Yes	No	Adrian	Giovanni Veronesi		
2011	Limitless	Yes	No	Carl Van Loon	Neil Burger		
2011	Killer Elite	Yes	No	Hunter	Gary McKendry		
2011	New Year's Eve	Yes	No	Stan Harris	Garry Marshall		
2012	Red Lights	Yes	No	Simon Silver	Rodrigo Cortés		
2012	Being Flynn	Yes	No	Jonathan Flynn	Paul Weitz		
2012	Freelancers	Yes	No	Sarcone	Jessy Terrero		
2012	Silver Linings Playbook	Yes	No	Patrizio "Pat" Solitano Sr.	David O. Russell		
2013	The Big Wedding	Yes	No	Don Griffin	Justin Zackham		
2013	Killing Season	Yes	No	Colonel Ben Ford	Mark Steven Johnson		
2013	The Family	Yes	No	Giovanni Manzoni / Fred Blake	Luc Besson		
2013	Last Vegas	Yes	No	Patrick "Paddy" Connors	Jon Turteltaub		
2013	American Hustle	Uncredited	No	Victor Tellegio	David O. Russell		
2013	Grudge Match	Yes	No	Billy "The Kid" McDonnen	Peter Segal		
2014	The Bag Man	Yes	No	Dragna	David Grovic		
2015	The Intern	Yes	No	Ben Whittaker	Nancy Meyers		
2015	The Audition	Yes	No	Himself	Martin Scorsese	Short film	
2015	Heist	Yes	No	Frank "The Pope" Silva	Scott Mann		
2015	Joy	Yes	No	Rudy Mangano	David O. Russell		
2016	Dirty Grandpa	Yes	No	Lt. Col. Richard "Dick" Kelly	Dan Mazer		
2016	Hands of Stone	Yes	No	Ray Arcel	Jonathan Jakubowicz		
2016	The Comedian	Yes	No	Jakov Berkowitz / Jackie Burke	Taylor Hackford		
2019	Joker	Yes	No	Murray Franklin	Todd Phillips		
2019	The Irishman	Yes	Yes	Frank "The Irishman" Sheeran	Martin Scorsese		
2020	The War with Grandpa	Yes	No	Ed Marino	Tim Hill		
2020	Father of the Bride, Part 3(ish)	Yes	No	James	Nancy Meyers	Short film	
2020	The Comeback Trail	Yes	No	Max Barber	George Gallo		
2022	Amsterdam	Yes	No	Gil Dillenbeck	David O. Russell		
2022	Savage Salvation	Yes	No	Sheriff Mike Church	Randall Emmett		
2023	Killers of the Flower Moon	Yes	No	William King Hale	Martin Scorsese		
2023	About My Father	Yes	No	Salvo Maniscalco	Laura Terruso		
2023	Ezra	Yes	Executive	Stan	Tony Goldwyn		
2025	The Alto Knights	Yes	No	Vito Genovese, Frank Costello	Barry Levinson		
2025	Tin Soldier	Yes	No	Ashburn	Brad Furman		
2026	The Whisper Man	Yes	No	Pete Willis	James Ashcroft		
2026	Focker-in-Law †	Yes	Yes	Jack Tiberius Byrnes	John Hamburg	Post-production	

=== Television ===
Year	Title	Role	Note(s)	Ref.
2001	Sesame Street	Himself	Episode: "Hurricane, Part 3"	
2002–2010	Saturday Night Live	Himself (host)	3 episodes	
2006	Extras	Himself	Episode: "Jonathan Ross"	
2011	30 Rock	Himself	Episode: "Operation Righteous Cowboy Lightning"	
2015	Saturday Night Live 40th Anniversary Special	Himself	Television special	
2017	The Wizard of Lies	Bernie Madoff	Television film; also executive producer	
2017	One Night Only: Alec Baldwin	Himself	Television special	
2023	Nada	Vincent Parisi	5 episodes	
2025	Saturday Night Live 50th Anniversary Special	Himself	Television special	
2025	Zero Day	George Mullen	Miniseries; also executive producer	
2025	Jimmy Kimmel Live!	FCC Chairman Brendan Carr	Parody; Season 24 Episode 10	

=== Theater ===
Year	Title	Role	Playwright	Theatre	Ref(s).
1986	Cuba and His Teddy Bear	Cuba	Reinaldo Povod	Longacre Theatre, Broadway	

== Documentaries ==
Year	Title	Role	Director	Note(s)	Ref(s).
1965	Encounter	The Nephew	Norman C. Chaitin	Short film	
1987	Dear America: Letters Home from Vietnam	Great Sewer	Bill Couturié	Voice role	
1998	Lenny Bruce: Swear to Tell the Truth	Narrator	Robert B. Weide		
2002	9/11	Himself (host)	Gédéon Naudet / Jules Naudet / James Hanlon		
2003	Hans Hofmann: Artist/Teacher, Teacher/Artist	Narrator	—N/a		
2009	I Knew It Was You	Himself	Richard Shepard		
2011	Corman's World: Exploits of a Hollywood Rebel	Himself	Alex Stapleton		
2014	The Man Who Saved the World	Himself	Peter Anthony		
2014	Remembering the Artist: Robert De Niro, Sr.	Himself	Geeta Gandbhir / Perri Peltz	Short film	
2015	Ellis	Himself	JR	Short film	

== As producer only ==
Year	Title	Note(s)	Ref(s).
1992	Thunderheart	Producer	
1993	The Night We Never Met	Producer - uncredited	
1995	Panther	Producer - uncredited	
1996	Faithful	Producer	
1998	Witness to the Mob	Executive producer, TV film	
1999	Entropy	Producer	
2000	Holiday Heart	Executive producer, TV film	
2001	Prison Song	Producer	
2002	About a Boy	Producer	
2004	Stage Beauty	Producer	
2005	Rent	Producer	
2009	Public Enemies	Executive producer	
2012	NYC 22	Executive producer, Television series	
2014	About a Boy	Executive producer, Television series	
2015	For Justice	Executive producer, TV film	
2018	Quincy	Producer	
2019	When They See Us	Executive producer, Television series	

== See also ==
- List of awards and nominations received by Robert De Niro
