= Lenny Bruce: Swear to Tell the Truth =

1998 film

- Directed by: Robert B. Weide
- Written by: Robert B. Weide
- Produced by: Sheila Nevins; Anthony Radziwill; Robert B. Weide
- Starring: Lenny Bruce (archival footage); Steve Allen
- Narrated by: Robert De Niro
- Cinematography: Biff Bracht
- Edited by: Geof Bartz; Claire Scanlon; Robert B. Weide
- Production company: Whyaduck Productions
- Distributed by: HBO
- Release date: October 21, 1998
- Running time: 100 minutes
- Country: United States
- Language: English

Lenny Bruce: Swear to Tell the Truth is a 1998 documentary film directed by Robert B. Weide about the comedian Lenny Bruce.

== Accolades ==
It was nominated for an Academy Award for Best Documentary Feature. The film was edited by Mr. Weide and Geof Bartz, A.C.E. who won a Primetime Emmy Award for their work on this film.

== Summary ==
The film was narrated by Robert De Niro. It featured interviews include Lenny's ex-wife Honey, mother Sally Marr and former TV host Steve Allen, who had Bruce on his show a few times albeit clean unlike his nightclub stand-up jokes.

It also featured audio recordings of and newspaper articles about some of Lenny's more controversial routines and archival footage of the comedian's early years, including his appearances on Arthur Godfrey's Talent Scouts and Playboy Penthouse and his rare big screen effort: the 1953 exploitation film Dance Hall Racket.

== See also ==
- Robert De Niro filmography
