= List of awards and nominations received by Robert De Niro =

Robert De Niro awards and nominations
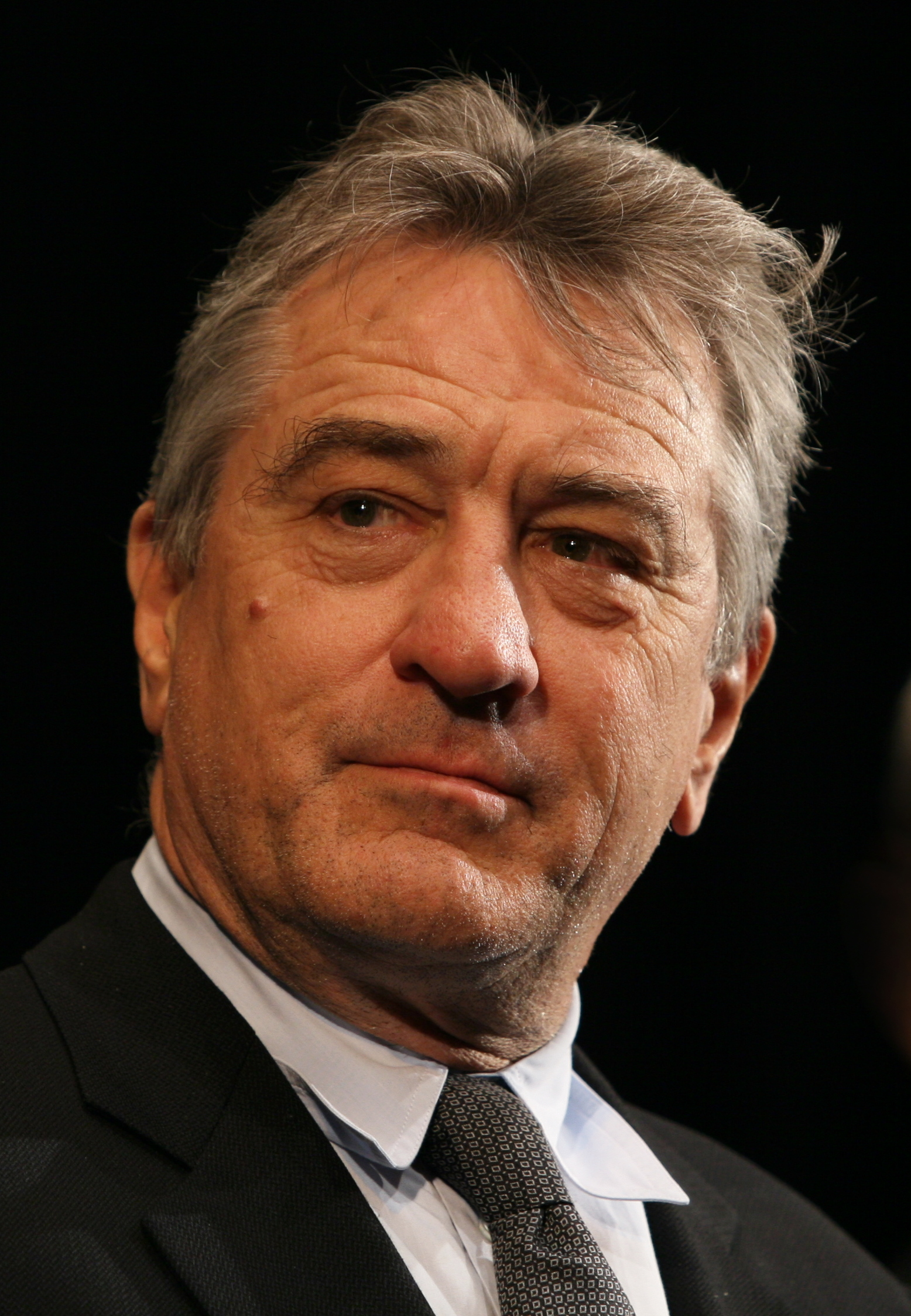
- De Niro at the KVIFF in 2008
Awards and nominations
Award	Wins	Nominations
Academy Awards	2	9
BAFTA Awards	0	8
Golden Globe Awards	1	11
Primetime Emmy Award	0	4
Screen Actors Guild Awards	0	5

Totals (Note: Certain award groups do not simply award one winner. They acknowledge several different recipients, have runners-up, and have third place. Since this is a specific recognition and is different from losing an award, runner-up mentions are considered wins in this award tally. For simplification and to avoid errors, each award in this list has been presumed to have had a prior nomination.)
- Wins: 42
- Nominations: 97

This article is a List of awards and nominations received by Robert De Niro.

Robert De Niro is an American actor and film producer. He has received numerous accolades including two Academy Awards, and a Golden Globe Award, as well as nominations for eight BAFTA Awards, four Primetime Emmy Awards, and five Screen Actors Guild Awards.

De Niro won two Academy Awards, his first for Best Supporting Actor for his role as Vito Corleone in the Francis Ford Coppola's crime epic The Godfather Part II (1974) and his second for Best Actor for his portrayal of boxer Jake LaMotta in Martin Scorsese's drama Raging Bull (1980). He was Oscar-nominated for his performances as Travis Bickle in the crime drama Taxi Driver (1976), a soldier in the Vietnam War in the war epic The Deer Hunter (1978), an encephalitis lethargica patient in drama Awakenings (1990), Max Cady in crime thriller Cape Fear (1991), a concerned father in comedy-drama Silver Linings Playbook (2012), and William King Hale in western epic Killers of the Flower Moon (2023).

A nine-time Academy Award nominee, he is also an eight-time BAFTA Award nominee, and a ten-time Golden Globe Award nominee, having won the Golden Globe Award for Best Actor in a Motion Picture – Drama for Raging Bull (1980). On television, he was nominated for the Primetime Emmy Award for Outstanding Lead Actor in a Limited Series or Movie his portrayal of Bernie Madoff in the HBO television film The Wizard of Lies (2017), and the Primetime Emmy Award for Outstanding Guest Actor in a Comedy Series for playing Robert Mueller on Saturday Night Live (2019).

Over his career he has received numerous honorary awards including the Venice International Film Festival's Golden Lion in 1993, the Berlin International Film Festival's Silver Bear in 2000, the AFI Life Achievement Award in 2003, the Kennedy Center Honors in 2009, the Golden Globe Cecil B. DeMille Award in 2011, and the Screen Actors Guild Life Achievement Award in 2019. De Niro received the Presidential Medal of Freedom from Barack Obama in 2016. De Niro was also due to receive a leadership award from the National Association of Broadcasters in 2024, before the honour was withdrawn following De Niro's criticism of Donald Trump outside the President's criminal trial in New York.

== Major associations ==
=== Academy Awards ===
Year	Category	Nominated work	Result	Ref.
1975	Best Supporting Actor	The Godfather Part II	Won	
1977	Best Actor	Taxi Driver	Nominated	
1979	Best Actor	The Deer Hunter	Nominated	
1981	Best Actor	Raging Bull	Won	
1991	Best Actor	Awakenings	Nominated	
1992	Best Actor	Cape Fear	Nominated	
2013	Best Supporting Actor	Silver Linings Playbook	Nominated	
2020	Best Picture	The Irishman	Nominated	
2024	Best Supporting Actor	Killers of the Flower Moon	Nominated	

=== BAFTA Awards ===
Year	Category	Nominated work	Result	Ref.
British Academy Film Awards
1976	Best Film Newcomer	The Godfather Part II	Nominated	
1977	Best Actor in a Leading Role	Taxi Driver	Nominated	
1980	Best Actor in a Leading Role	The Deer Hunter	Nominated	
1982	Best Actor in a Leading Role	Raging Bull	Nominated	
1984	Best Actor in a Leading Role	The King of Comedy	Nominated	
1991	Best Actor in a Leading Role	Goodfellas	Nominated	
2020	Best Film	The Irishman	Nominated	
2024	Best Actor in a Supporting Role	Killers of the Flower Moon	Nominated	

=== Emmy Awards ===
Year	Category	Nominated work	Result	Ref.
Primetime Emmy Awards
2017	Outstanding Television Movie	The Wizard of Lies	Nominated	
2017	Outstanding Lead Actor in a Limited Series or Movie	The Wizard of Lies	Nominated	
2019	Outstanding Limited Series	When They See Us	Nominated	
2019	Outstanding Guest Actor in a Comedy Series	Saturday Night Live	Nominated	

=== Golden Globe Awards ===
Year	Category	Nominated work	Result	Ref.
1977	Best Actor in a Motion Picture – Drama	Taxi Driver	Nominated	
1978	Best Actor in a Motion Picture – Musical or Comedy	New York, New York	Nominated	
1979	Best Actor in a Motion Picture – Drama	The Deer Hunter	Nominated	
1981	Best Actor in a Motion Picture – Drama	Raging Bull	Won	
1989	Best Actor in a Motion Picture – Musical or Comedy	Midnight Run	Nominated	
1992	Best Actor in a Motion Picture – Drama	Cape Fear	Nominated	
2000	Best Actor in a Motion Picture – Musical or Comedy	Analyze This	Nominated	
2001	Best Actor in a Motion Picture – Musical or Comedy	Meet the Parents	Nominated	
2011	Cecil B. DeMille Award	—N/a	Honored	
2018	Best Actor in a Miniseries or Motion Picture – Television	The Wizard of Lies	Nominated	
2020	Best Motion Picture – Drama	The Irishman	Nominated	
2024	Best Supporting Actor – Motion Picture	Killers of the Flower Moon	Nominated	

=== Screen Actors Guild Awards ===
Year	Category	Nominated work	Result	Ref.
1997	Outstanding Cast in a Motion Picture	Marvin's Room	Nominated	
2013	Outstanding Cast in a Motion Picture	Silver Linings Playbook	Nominated	
2013	Outstanding Actor in a Supporting Role	Silver Linings Playbook	Nominated	
2018	Outstanding Actor in a Miniseries Movie	The Wizard of Lies	Nominated	
2020	Outstanding Cast in a Motion Picture	The Irishman	Nominated	
2020	Life Achievement Award	—N/a	Honored	
2024	Outstanding Actor in a Supporting Role	Killers of the Flower Moon	Nominated	
2024	Outstanding Cast in a Motion Picture	Killers of the Flower Moon	Nominated	

== Critics awards ==
Organizations	Year	Category	Work	Result	Ref.
Boston Society of Film Critics	1981	Best Actor	Raging Bull	Won	
Critics' Choice Awards	2017	Best Television Movie or Miniseries Actor	The Wizard of Lies	Nominated	
Critics' Choice Awards	2020	Best Movie	The Irishman	Nominated	
Critics' Choice Awards	2020	Best Actor	The Irishman	Nominated	
Critics' Choice Awards	2020	Best Cast	The Irishman	Won	
Critics' Choice Awards	2023	Best Supporting Actor	Killers of the Flower Moon	Nominated	
Critics' Choice Awards	2023	Best Cast	Killers of the Flower Moon	Nominated	
Detroit Film Critics Society	2012	Best Supporting Actor	Silver Linings Playbook	Won	
Los Angeles Film Critics Association	1976	Best Actor	Taxi Driver	Won	
Los Angeles Film Critics Association	1980	Best Actor	Raging Bull	Won	
National Board of Review	1980	Best Actor	Raging Bull	Won	
National Board of Review	1990	Best Actor (tied)	Awakenings	Won	
National Society of Film Critics	1974	Best Supporting Actor	Mean Streets	Won	
National Society of Film Critics	1977	Best Actor	Taxi Driver	Won	
New York Film Critics Circle	1974	Best Supporting Actor	Mean Streets	Won	
New York Film Critics Circle	1977	Best Actor	Taxi Driver	Won	
New York Film Critics Circle	1981	Best Actor	Raging Bull	Won	
New York Film Critics Circle	1991	Best Actor	Awakenings	Won	
New York Film Critics Circle	1991	Best Actor	Goodfellas	Won	

== Miscellaneous awards ==
Organizations	Year	Category	Work	Result	Ref.
AACTA Awards	2013	Best International Supporting Actor – Cinema	Silver Linings Playbook	Won	
AACTA Awards	2020	Best International Lead Actor – Cinema	The Irishman	Nominated	
AACTA Awards	2024	Best International Supporting Actor – Cinema	Killers of the Flower Moon	Nominated	
American Comedy Awards	2000	Funniest Actor in a Motion Picture (Leading Role)	Analyze This	Nominated	
American Comedy Awards	2001	Funniest Actor in a Motion Picture (Leading Role)	Meet the Parents	Nominated	
American Movie Awards	1980	Best Actor	The Deer Hunter	Nominated	
Berlin International Film Festival	2007	Golden Berlin Bear	The Good Shepherd	Nominated	
Berlin International Film Festival	2007	Silver Bear for Outstanding Artistic Contribution (shared with ensemble cast)	The Good Shepherd	Won	
Blockbuster Entertainment Awards	2000	Favorite a Comedy Team	Analyze This	Won	
Blockbuster Entertainment Awards	2001	Favorite Actor – Comedy	Meet the Parents	Nominated	
Capri Hollywood International Film Festival	2012	Best Ensemble Cast (shared with the cast)	Silver Linings Playbook	Won	
Christopher Award	1997	Motion Pictures (shared)	Marvin's Room	Won	
MTV Movie Awards	1992	Best Male Performance	Cape Fear	Nominated	
MTV Movie Awards	1992	Best Villain	Cape Fear	Nominated	
MTV Movie Awards	1992	Best Kiss (shared)	Cape Fear	Nominated	
MTV Movie Awards	1997	Best Villain	The Fan	Nominated	
MTV Movie Awards	1999	Best Action Sequence (shared)	Ronin	Nominated	
MTV Movie Awards	2001	Best Line from a Movie	Meet the Parents	Won	
MTV Movie Awards	2001	Best On-Screen Team (shared)	Meet the Parents	Nominated	
Satellite Awards	2001	Best Supporting Actor – Film	Men of Honor	Nominated	
Satellite Awards	2012	Best Supporting Actor – Film	Silver Linings Playbook	Nominated	
Satellite Awards	2017	Best Actor – Miniseries or Television Film	The Wizard of Lies	Won	
Satellite Awards	2023	Best Supporting Actor – Film	Killers of the Flower Moon	Nominated	
Saturn Awards	1988	Best Supporting Actor	Angel Heart	Nominated	
Saturn Awards	1995	Best Supporting Actor	Frankenstein	Nominated	

== Honorary awards ==
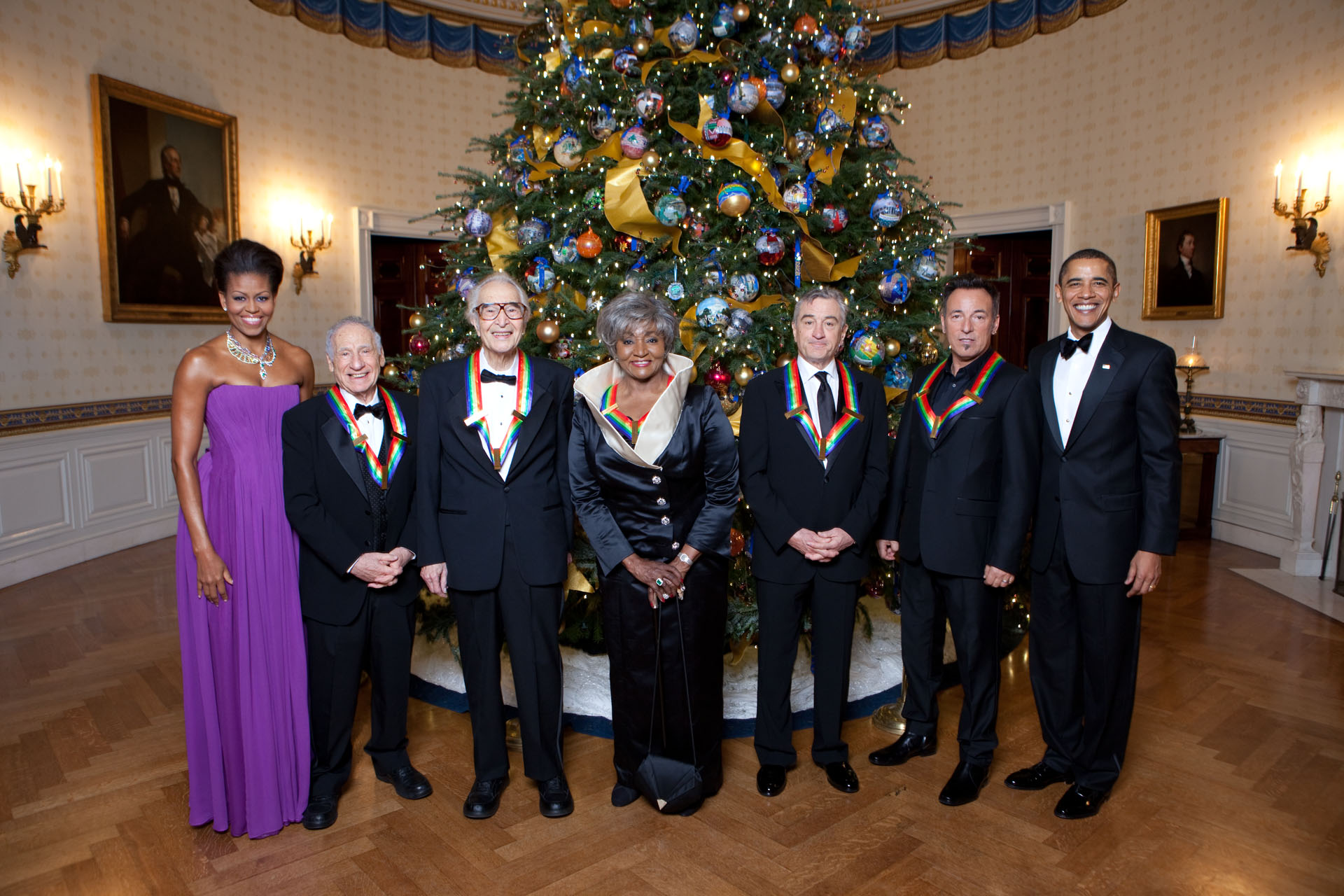
De Niro, third from right, upon receiving his Kennedy Center Honor

Organizations	Year	Award	Result	Ref.
Hasty Pudding Theatricals	1979	Man of the Year	Honored	
Venice International Film Festival	1993	Golden Lion Honorary Award	Honored	
Moscow International Film Festival	1997	Contribution to World Cinema	Honored	
San Sebastián International Film Festival	2000	Donostia Lifetime Achievement Award	Honored	
Berlin International Film Festival	2000	Silver Bear for Artistic Contribution	Honored	
Gotham Awards	2001	Honorary Award	Honored	
American Film Institute	2003	AFI Lifetime Achievement	Honored	
Golden Camera, Germany	2008	Lifetime Achievement, International	Honored	
Karlovy Vary International Film Festival	2008	Outstanding Artistic Contribution to World Cinema	Honored	
Kennedy Center Honors	2009	Medal	Honored	
Golden Globe Awards	2011	The Cecil B. DeMille Award	Honored	
Bates College	2012	Honorary Doctorate in Fine Arts	Honored	
GLAAD Media Award	2016	Excellence in Media Award	Honored	
Presidential Medal of Freedom	2016	Medal	Honored	
Sarajevo Film Festival	2016	Honorary Heart of Sarajevo	Honored	
Brown University	2017	Honorary Doctorate in Fine Arts	Honored	
Screen Actors Guild Awards	2019	Screen Actors Guild Life Achievement Award	Honored	
Cannes Film Festival	2025	Honorary Palme d'Or	Honored	

== Citations ==
This list includes ranks and honors given by websites, channels or magazines:

Year	Vote / rank	List name	Ref.
1997	5	Empire (UK) magazine's "The Top 100 Movie Stars of All Time"	
2002	78	Premiere magazine's annual Power 100 List	
2004	1	Empire (UK) magazine's "The Greatest Living Actor (Gods Among Us)" List	
2005	38	Premiere magazine's "Greatest Movie Stars of All Time (Stars in Our Constellation)" List	
2005	10	AFI's 100 Years...100 Movie Quotes for his line "You talkin' to me?"	
2006	10	Premiere magazine's 100 Greatest Performances of All Time for his performance as Jake LaMotta in Raging Bull	
2006	42	Premiere magazine's 100 Greatest Performances of All Time for his performance as Travis Bickle in Taxi Driver	

== Sources ==
- Awards for Robert De Niro at IMDb
