= Grace Hightower =

American actress, singer, socialite, and philanthropist

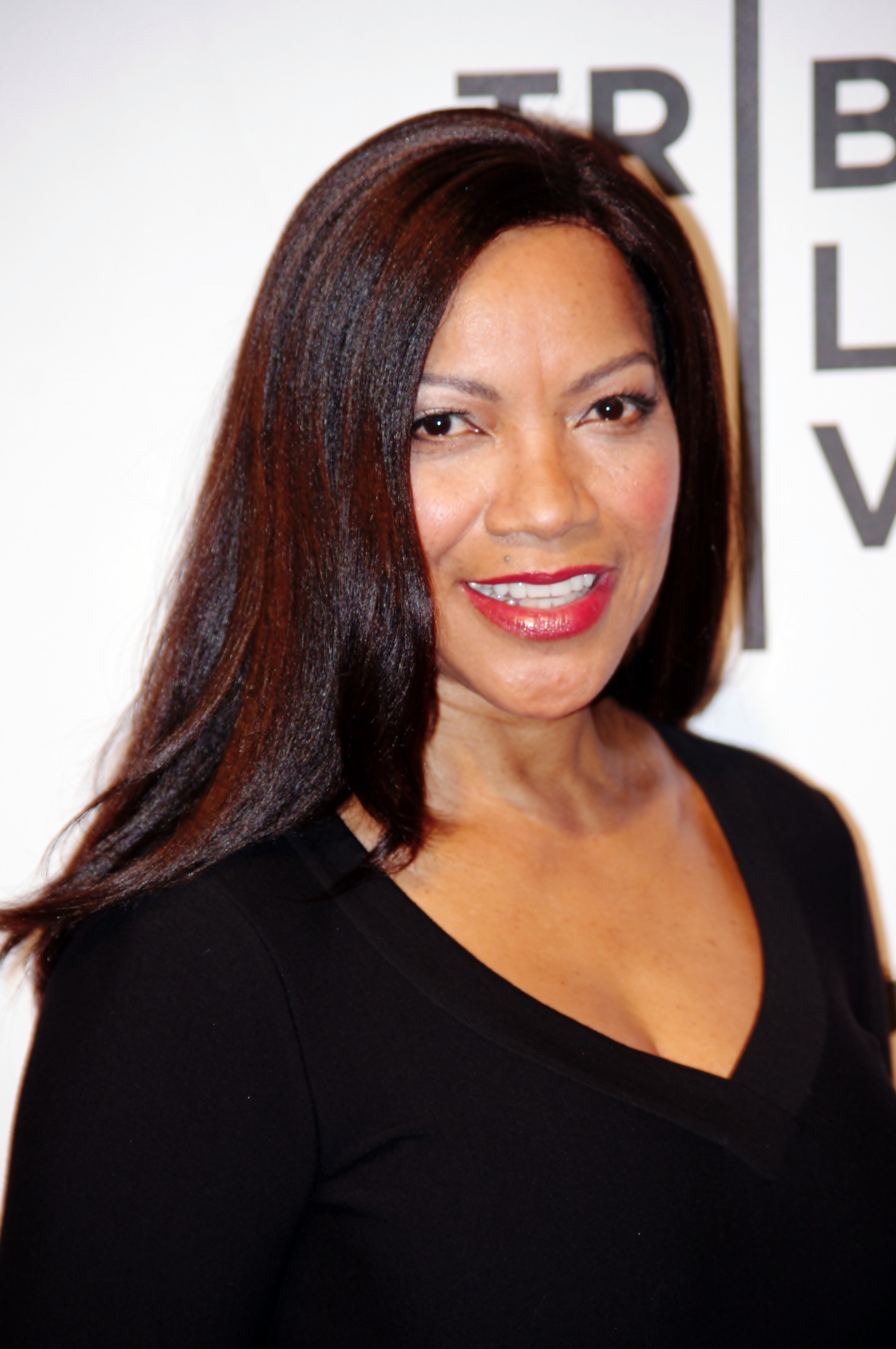
- Hightower attending the premiere of The Union at the 2011 Tribeca Film Festival
- Occupations: socialite; philanthropist; actress; singer
- Years active: since 1994
- Spouse: Robert De Niro (m. 1997; sep. 2018)
- Children: 2

Grace Hightower is an American socialite, actress, and former flight attendant. She married Robert De Niro in 1997 and separated from him in 2018.

== Career ==
As a socialite, Hightower's gala 55th birthday party was covered in Vogue magazine by André Leon Talley. In 2010, she presented the Pratt Institute's Creative Spirit Award to director Lee Daniels.

As an actress, Hightower has had minor roles in various movies including Precious (2009) and The Paperboy (2012). Additionally, she had a minor part in the ABC TV series, NYPD Blue, in the 1994 Season One episode entitled "Zeppo Marks Brothers".

As a singer, she performed the lead vocals for the track, "Somethin's Comin' My Way", written by Dan Manjovi for the 2009 Precious movie soundtrack.

== Personal life ==
Hightower is of African-American descent and was raised in Kilmichael, Mississippi. She grew up in poverty, and worked various odd jobs to help support her family. Hightower became a flight attendant for Trans World Airlines, attracted by the possibility of traveling and expanding her horizons. Settling in Paris and later London, she worked variously as a mutual fund trader and restaurant worker. In 1997, while working at Mr. Chow, an upmarket London Chinese restaurant and celebrity hangout, she met and began dating Robert De Niro.

Hightower and De Niro married in 1997. In 1998, she gave birth to the couple's first child. De Niro filed for divorce in 1999 and sued Hightower for custody of their son in 2001. The two resolved their differences, however, and by 2004 the divorce was dropped and they renewed their vows. In 2011, the couple had their second child, via surrogacy. They separated in November 2018.

== Filmography ==
=== Film ===
| Year | Title | Role | Notes |
|---|---|---|---|
| 1997 | Brotherhood | Cris | Fan film |
| 2009 | Precious | Ms. Turner (social worker) | |
| 2012 | The Paperboy | Yardley's Girlfriend | |
| 2017 | Unspoken: Diary of an Assassin | | |

=== Television ===
| Year | Title | Role | Notes |
|---|---|---|---|
| 1994 | NYPD Blue | E.S.U. Woman | Episode: "Zeppo Marks Brothers" |
