= Robert De Niro =

American actor (born 1943)

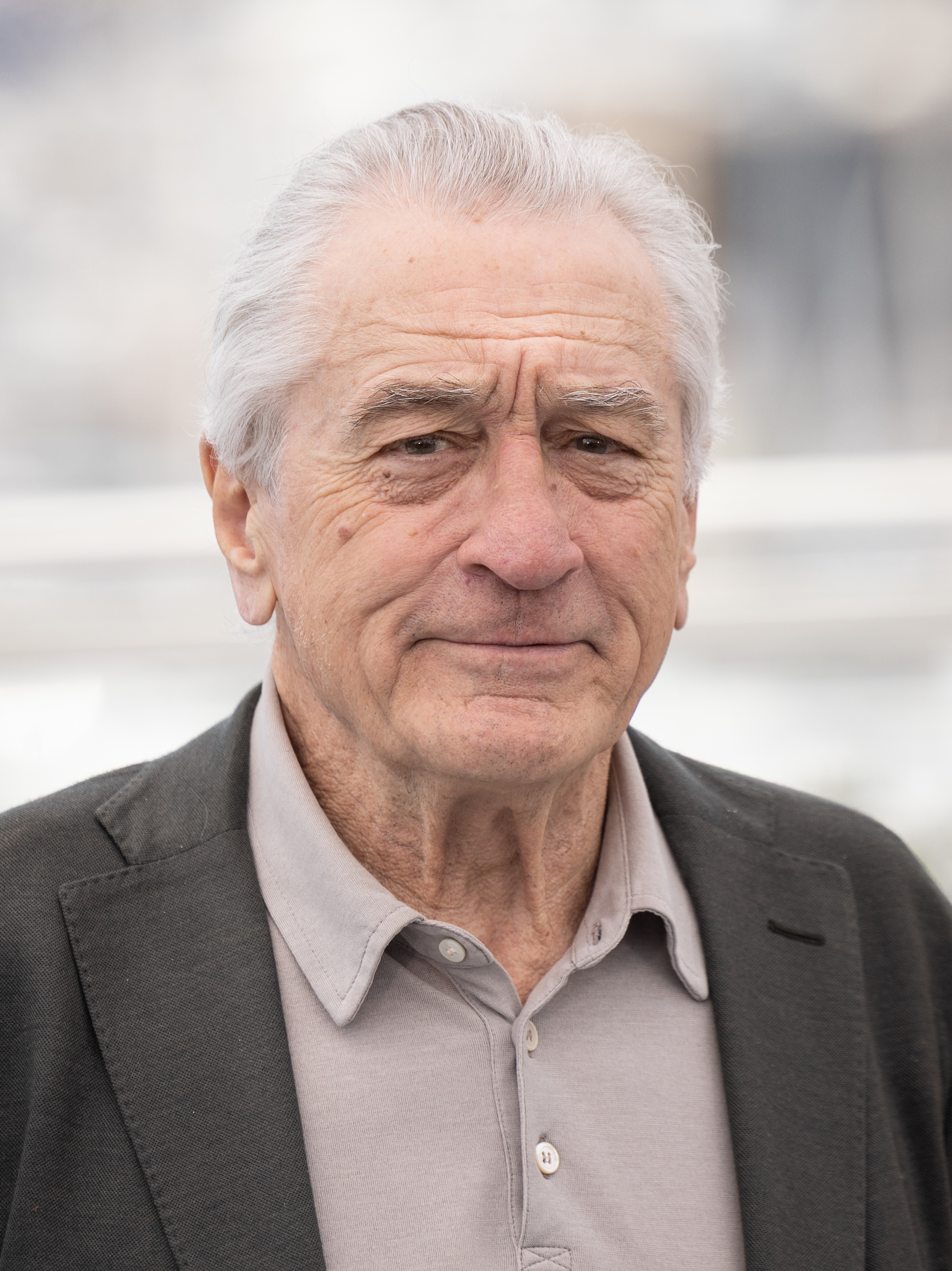
- De Niro at the 2025 Cannes Film Festival
- Born: Robert Anthony De Niro; August 17, 1943 (age 83); New York City, U.S.
- Citizenship: United States; Italy
- Occupations: Actor; film director; producer
- Years active: 1963–present
- Works: Filmography; Scorsese collaborations
- Spouses: Diahnne Abbott (m. 1976; div. 1988); Grace Hightower (m. 1997; sep. 2018)
- Children: 7, including Drena and Raphael
- Parents: Robert De Niro Sr.; Virginia Admiral
- Awards: Full list

Robert Anthony De Niro (/də ˈnɪəroʊ/ də NEER-roh; Italian: [de ˈniːro]; born August 17, 1943) is an American actor and producer. Widely regarded as one of the greatest and most influential actors of his generation, he has received various accolades, including two Academy Awards and a Golden Globe Award as well as nominations for eight BAFTA Awards and four Emmy Awards. He was honored with the AFI Life Achievement Award in 2003, the Kennedy Center Honors in 2009, the Cecil B. DeMille Award in 2011, the Presidential Medal of Freedom in 2016, the Screen Actors Guild Life Achievement Award in 2019, and the Honorary Palme d'Or in 2025.

De Niro studied acting at HB Studio, Stella Adler Conservatory, and Lee Strasberg's Actors Studio. He won the Academy Award for Best Supporting Actor for his role as Vito Corleone in the crime drama The Godfather Part II (1974), becoming the first male to win for an Italian-language performance. Six years later, he won the Academy Award for Best Actor for his portrayal of Jake LaMotta in the biopic drama Raging Bull (1980). He was further Oscar-nominated for his performances in Taxi Driver (1976), The Deer Hunter (1978), Awakenings (1990), Cape Fear (1991), Silver Linings Playbook (2012), and Killers of the Flower Moon (2023), while also earning a nomination for Best Picture for producing The Irishman (2019).

De Niro is known for his dramatic roles in Mean Streets (1973), 1900 (1976), The King of Comedy (1982), Once Upon a Time in America (1984), Brazil (1985), The Mission (1986), Angel Heart (1987), The Untouchables (1987), Goodfellas (1990), This Boy's Life (1993), Heat (1995), Casino (1995), Jackie Brown (1997), Ronin (1998), and Joker (2019), as well as his comedic roles in Midnight Run (1988), Wag the Dog (1997), Analyze This (1999), the Meet the Parents films (2000–present), and The Intern (2015). He directed and acted in both the crime drama A Bronx Tale (1993) and the spy film The Good Shepherd (2006). On television, he portrayed Bernie Madoff in the HBO film The Wizard of Lies (2017).

De Niro and producer Jane Rosenthal founded the film and television production company TriBeCa Productions in 1989, which has produced several films alongside his own. Also with Rosenthal, he founded the Tribeca Film Festival in 2002. Many of De Niro's films are considered classics of American cinema. Six of De Niro's films have been inducted into the United States National Film Registry by the Library of Congress as "culturally, historically, or aesthetically significant" as of 2023. Five films were listed on the AFI's 100 greatest American films of all time.

== Early life and education ==
Robert Anthony De Niro was born in Manhattan, New York City, on August 17, 1943, the only child of painters Virginia Admiral and Robert De Niro Sr. His father was of Irish and Italian descent, while his mother had Dutch, English, French, and German ancestry. His parents, who had met at the painting classes of Hans Hofmann in Provincetown, Massachusetts, separated when he was two years old after his father announced that he was gay. De Niro was raised by his mother in the Greenwich Village and Little Italy neighborhoods of Manhattan. His father lived nearby, and remained close with De Niro during his childhood. Nicknamed "Bobby Milk" because of his pale complexion, De Niro befriended many street kids in Little Italy, much to the disapproval of his father. Some, however, have remained his lifelong friends. His mother was raised Presbyterian but became an atheist as an adult, while his father had been a lapsed Catholic since the age of 12. Against his parents' wishes, his grandparents had De Niro secretly baptized into the Catholic Church while he was staying with them during his parents' divorce.

De Niro attended PS 41, a public elementary school in Manhattan, through the sixth grade. He began acting classes at the Dramatic Workshop and made his stage debut in school at age 10, playing the Cowardly Lion in The Wizard of Oz. He later went to Elisabeth Irwin High School, the upper school of the Little Red School House, for the seventh and eighth grades. He was then accepted into the High School of Music & Art for the ninth grade, but attended for only a short time before transferring to a public junior high school: IS 71, Charles Evans Hughes Junior High School. De Niro attended high school at McBurney School and later, Rhodes Preparatory School. He found performing to be a way to relieve his shyness, and became fascinated by cinema, so he dropped out of high school at 16 to pursue acting. He later said, "When I was around 18, I was looking at a TV show and I said, 'If these actors are making a living at it, and they're not really that good, I can't do any worse than them.'" He studied acting at HB Studio and Lee Strasberg's Actors Studio. De Niro also studied with Stella Adler, of the Stella Adler Conservatory, where he was exposed to the techniques of the Stanislavski system. As a young actor, De Niro was inspired by the work of Marlon Brando, Montgomery Clift, James Dean, Greta Garbo, Geraldine Page, and Kim Stanley.

== Career ==
=== 1963–1973: Early roles and breakthrough ===
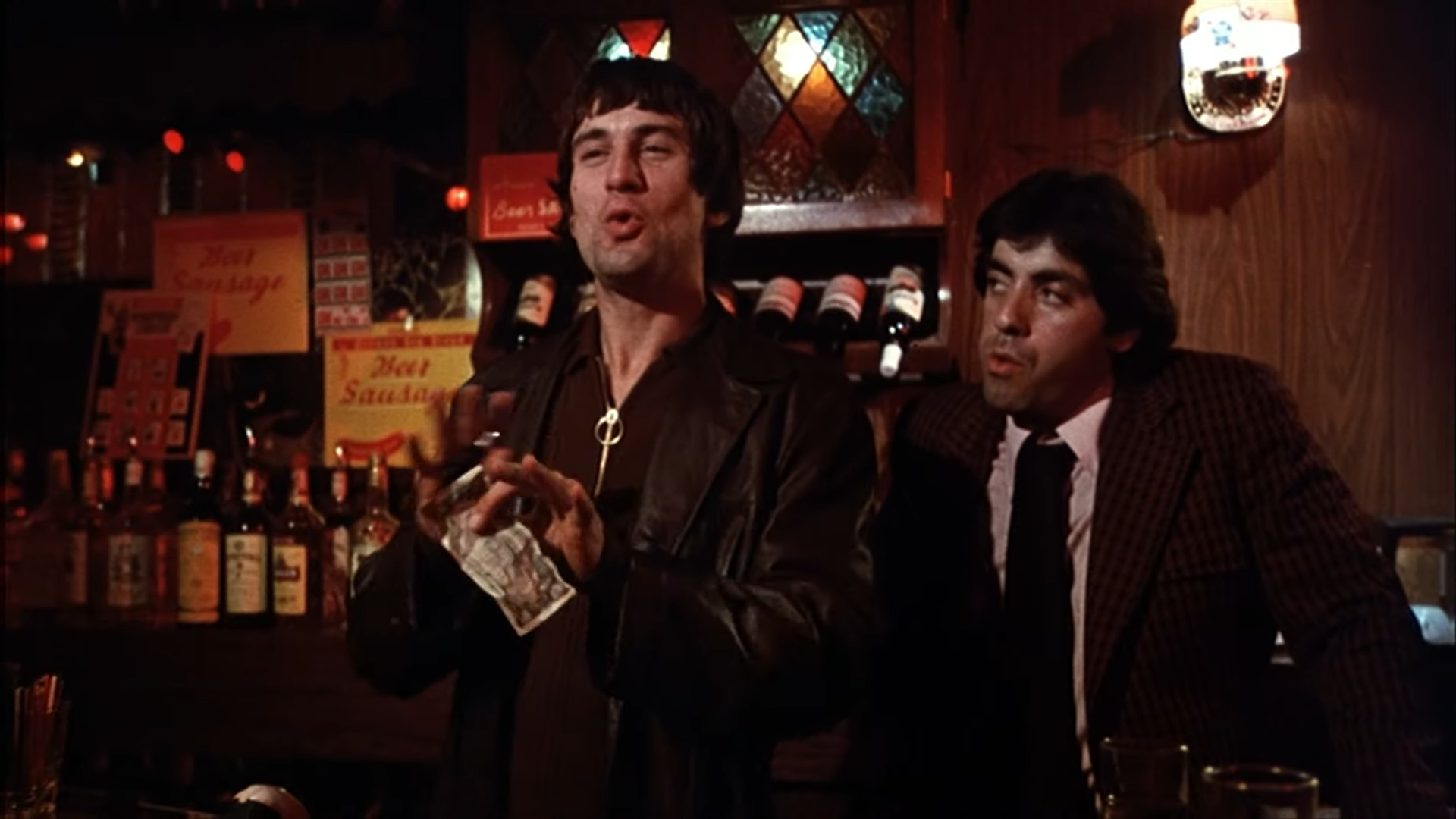
De Niro playing small time criminal "Johnny Boy" Civello in Martin Scorsese's film Mean Streets (1973)

De Niro had minor film roles in Encounter, Three Rooms in Manhattan (both released in 1965) and Les Jeunes Loups (1968). Shortly afterwards, De Niro landed a major role in Greetings (1968), a satirical film about men avoiding the Vietnam War draft. The film marked the first of a series of early collaborations between De Niro and director Brian De Palma.

In July 1968, De Niro made his stage debut in Jackie Curtis' Off-Off Broadway production Glamour, Glory, and Gold: The Life and Legend of Nola Noonan, Goddess and Star, at Playwright's Workshop in Manhattan's East Village. De Niro played several roles and received a favorable review in The Village Voice.

In 1969, De Niro appeared in the drama Sam's Song in which he portrays a New York City filmmaker. Also that year, he appeared in De Palma's comedy The Wedding Party; although it was filmed in 1963, it was kept unreleased for six years. De Niro, who was still unknown at the time, gained a favorable review from The New York Times' Howard Thompson: "This farcical comedy, modestly produced by a trio of young people and utilizing some unfamiliar faces, is great fun."

He then appeared in Roger Corman's low-budget crime drama Bloody Mama (1970), a loose adaptation of Ma Barker's life, who was the mother of four American criminals, of which De Niro portrayed one: Lloyd Barker. Thompson praised the film and thought the cast gave "fine performances". Next, De Niro starred in De Palma's comedy Hi, Mom! (1970), a sequel to Greetings. Writing for The New Yorker, Richard Brody opined that De Niro "brings unhinged spontaneity" to his character. He also had a small role in Jennifer on My Mind (1971) and in Ivan Passer's Born to Win (1971). His last film appearance of 1971 was in The Gang That Couldn't Shoot Straight, a crime-comedy based on the 1969 novel by Jimmy Breslin.

In 1972, De Niro starred in two performances at The American Place Theatre, directed by Charles Maryan. He then returned to the big screen with Bang the Drum Slowly (1973), in which he played the lead role as Bruce Pearson, a Major League Baseball player with Hodgkin disease. His co-stars were Michael Moriarty and Vincent Gardenia. Adapted from the 1956 novel of the same name by Mark Harris, the film received critical acclaim and helped De Niro gain further recognition. The Hollywood Reporter wrote, "De Niro proves himself to be one of the best and most likable young character actors in movies with this performance." Variety magazine's Alex Belth also took note of De Niro's "touching" portrayal, while Gardenia was nominated for an Academy Award for Best Supporting Actor. Harris later wrote about De Niro, "He learned only as much baseball as he needed for his role [...] I doubt that he ever cared to touch a baseball again."

In 1973, De Niro began collaborating with Martin Scorsese when he appeared in the crime film Mean Streets, co-starring Harvey Keitel. Although De Niro was offered a choice of roles, Scorsese wanted De Niro to play "Johnny Boy" Civello, a small time criminal working his way up into a local mob. While De Niro and Keitel were given freedom to improvise certain scenes, assistant director Ron Satlof recalls De Niro was "extremely serious, extremely involved in his role and preparation", and became isolated from the rest of the cast and crew. Mean Streets debuted at the Cannes Film Festival, followed by the New York Film Festival five months later, to a generally warm response. Film critic Roger Ebert thought De Niro gave a "marvelous performance, filled with urgency and restless desperation." Pauline Kael of The New York Times was equally impressed by De Niro, writing he is "a bravura actor, and those who have registered him only as the grinning, tobacco-chewing dolt of that hunk of inept whimsey Bang the Drum Slowly will be unprepared for his volatile performance. De Niro does something like what Dustin Hoffman was doing in Midnight Cowboy, but wilder; this kid doesn't just act – he takes off into the vapors." In 1997, Mean Streets was selected for preservation in the U.S. National Film Registry by the Library of Congress as being "culturally, historically, or aesthetically significant".

=== 1974–1980: Collaboration with Martin Scorsese and acclaim ===
De Niro had a pivotal role in Francis Ford Coppola's crime epic The Godfather Part II (1974), playing the young Vito Corleone. De Niro had previously auditioned for the first installment, The Godfather (1972), but quit the project in favor of doing The Gang That Couldn't Shoot Straight. Coppola, having remembered him, gave De Niro a role in Part II instead. To portray his character, De Niro spoke mainly in several Sicilian dialects, although he delivered a few lines in English. The film was a commercial success and grossed $48 million at the worldwide box office. The Godfather Part II received eleven nominations at the 47th Academy Awards, winning six, including one for De Niro as Best Supporting Actor, making him the third-youngest winner in the category at the time. It was De Niro's first Academy win; Coppola accepted the award on his behalf as he did not attend the ceremony. De Niro and Marlon Brando, who played the older Vito Corleone in the first film, were the first pair of actors to win Academy Awards for portraying the same fictional character.

After working with Scorsese in Mean Streets, De Niro collaborated with him again for the psychological drama Taxi Driver (1976). Set in gritty and morally bankrupt New York City following the Vietnam War, the film tells the story of Travis Bickle, a lonely taxi driver who descends into insanity. In preparation for the role, De Niro spent time with members of a U.S. army base to learn their Midwestern accent and mannerisms. He also lost 30 pounds (13 kg) in weight, took firearm training and studied the behavior of taxi drivers. The film was critically acclaimed, in particular for De Niro's performance; The Washington Post critic hailed it as his "landmark performance", and the San Francisco Chronicle wrote "De Niro is dazzling in one of his signature roles." The film was nominated for four Academy Awards, including Best Actor for De Niro. His "You talkin' to me?" quote, which he improvised, was selected as the 10th most memorable quote in the AFI's 100 Years...100 Movie Quotes by the American Film Institute. In 2005, the film was chosen by Time magazine as one of the 100 best films of all time.

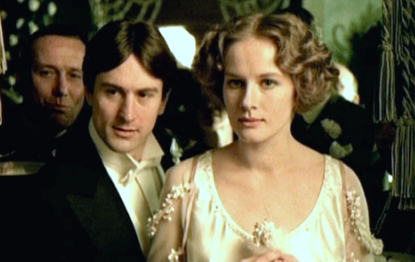
De Niro and Dominique Sanda play a married couple in the film 1900.

De Niro had two other film releases in 1976. He starred in 1900, a historical drama directed by Bernardo Bertolucci. Starring an ensemble cast, the film is set in the Emilia region of Italy, and tells the story of two men, the landowner Alfredo Berlinghieri (De Niro) and the peasant Olmo Dalcò (Gérard Depardieu), as they witness and participate in the political conflicts between fascism and communism in the first half of the twentieth century. Next, he played a CEO in The Last Tycoon, based on F. Scott Fitzgerald's novel of the same name, as adapted by British screenwriter Harold Pinter. De Niro lost 42 pounds (19 kg) for the role, and director Elia Kazan observed that De Niro would rehearse on Sundays, adding "Bobby and I would go over the scenes to be shot. Bobby is more meticulous ... he's very imaginative. He's very precise. He figures everything out both inside and outside. He has good emotion. He's a character actor: everything he does he calculates. In a good way, but he calculates." The film received mixed reviews; Variety magazine's critic opined that the film was "unfocused" and called De Niro's performance "mildly intriguing". Film critic Marie Brenner wrote, "it is a role that surpasses even his brilliant and daring portrayal of Vito Corleone in The Godfather Part II... his performance deserves to be compared with the very finest."

For De Niro's sole project of 1977, he starred in Scorsese's musical drama New York, New York opposite Liza Minnelli. De Niro learned to play the saxophone from musician Georgie Auld, to portray saxophonist Jimmy, who falls in love with a pop singer (Minnelli). The film received generally mixed reception, although critics were kinder to De Niro. The film was nominated for four Golden Globe awards including Best Actor in a Motion Picture Musical or Comedy for De Niro.

In 1978, De Niro starred in Michael Cimino's epic war film The Deer Hunter, in which he played a steelworker whose life was changed after serving in the Vietnam War. He co-starred with Christopher Walken, John Savage, John Cazale, Meryl Streep, and George Dzundza. The story takes place in Clairton, Pennsylvania, a working-class town on the Monongahela River south of Pittsburgh, and in Vietnam. Producer Michael Deeley pursued De Niro for the role, because the fame of his previous films would help make a "gruesome-sounding storyline and a barely known director" marketable. De Niro, impressed by the script and director's preparation, was among the first to sign on to the film. Reviews for The Deer Hunter were generally positive, and the cast attracted strong praise for their performances. The film received nominations at the Academy Awards, Golden Globes and British Academy Film Awards (BAFTAs), and earned De Niro a nomination for Best Actor at the Academy Awards. In 2007, the American Film Institute ranked it as the 53rd-greatest American film of all time in their 10th Anniversary Edition of the AFI's 100 Years...100 Movies list.

The fourth collaboration between De Niro and Scorsese was in 1980, with the biographical drama Raging Bull. Adapted from Jake LaMotta's memoir Raging Bull: My Story, De Niro portrays LaMotta, the Italian-American middleweight boxer whose violent behavior and temper destroyed his relationship with his wife and family. Co-starring Joe Pesci and Cathy Moriarty, De Niro later said it was one of the toughest roles to prepare for because he had to gain 60 pounds (27 kg), and had to learn to box. "The book's not great literature, but it's got a lot of heart", De Niro told Scorsese at the time. Although the film received critical acclaim, some reviewers were divided and criticized its "exceedingly violent" content; however, De Niro garnered praise for his realistic portrayal. The critic from The Hollywood Reporter declared that "De Niro is incredible and makes the actor almost unrecognizable as himself; he looks amazingly like La Motta. De Niro's appearance is also astonishing in the final scenes." Michael Thomson of the BBC observed "the power of Scorsese is matched by the intensity of De Niro who delves deep into the soul of the boxer." At the 53rd Academy Awards, the film received eight nominations, including Best Actor for De Niro for which he won. Raging Bull has since been regarded as one of the greatest films of the 1980s by American critics. De Niro was strongly considered for the role of Jack Torrance in Stanley Kubrick's The Shining, but it ended up going to Jack Nicholson, the director's first choice for the role.

=== 1981–1991: Dramas, comedies, and awards success ===
De Niro returned to the crime genre with True Confessions (1981), adapted from the 1977 novel of the same name by John Gregory Dunne. Less challenging than his previous film, De Niro played a priest who clashes with his brother (Robert Duvall), a detective investigating the murder of a prostitute. Vincent Canby of The New York Times thought the plot was hard to follow at times but praised the actors who "work so beautifully together it sometimes seems like a single performance." To expand his range of acting roles and to prove his acting abilities, De Niro sought out films with a comedic tone throughout the 1980s. He found it in The King of Comedy (1982), in which he played the struggling stand-up comedian Rupert Pupkin. De Niro was first to bring the script to the attention of Scorsese, who then gave it a New York setting and darker tone. The film failed to find an audience, and was a box office disappointment, grossing only $2.5 million from a budget of $19 million. However, most critics praised De Niro's performance. His next film credit was in Sergio Leone's Once Upon a Time in America (1984), in which he plays David "Noodles" Aaronson, a New York City Jewish gangster. The theatrical cut, with a runtime of 229 minutes, premiered at the 1984 Cannes Film Festival and received a 15-minute standing ovation. The film was shortened for theaters in the U.S. (139 minutes), but this proved to be highly unpopular with critics. After seeing the full cut, Kenneth Turan of the Los Angeles Times described the film as "excessive as well as tightly controlled" with the actors showing "impressive restraint and power".

Falling in Love, a romantic comedy starring opposite Meryl Streep, was his last release of 1984. One year later, De Niro starred in a science fiction for the first time, Brazil, about a daydreaming man living in a dystopian society. Although the film was unsuccessful at the box office, Brazil was included in The Criterion Collection. In May 1986, De Niro returned to the stage at Longacre Theatre, playing the lead role in the production Cuba and His Teddy Bear. For his next feature film, he co-starred in The Mission (1986) with Jeremy Irons, a period drama about the experiences of a Jesuit missionary in eighteenth century South America. Vincent Canby reviewed the film negatively, and was critical of De Niro's casting: "De Niro, who was very fine as the street-wise priest in True Confessions, is all right here until he opens his mouth." However, the film won an Academy Award for Best Cinematography, three BAFTAs, including Best Editing, and two Golden Globes for Best Screenplay and Best Original Score.

In 1987, De Niro had two minor film roles. In the first, he was cast as Louis Cyphre in Alan Parker's horror Angel Heart, an adaptation of William Hjortsberg's 1978 novel Falling Angel. In the second, he portrayed Al Capone in De Palma's crime drama, The Untouchables. While Pauline Kael opined that De Niro was "lazy" for undertaking small roles, De Palma defended him by saying he was "experimenting with those characters". In July 1987, he traveled to Russia to serve as president of the jury at the 15th Moscow International Film Festival. Finally that year, he provided a voice-over for the documentary Dear America: Letters Home from Vietnam. The buddy cop film, Midnight Run, was his next effort in 1988. Starring opposite Charles Grodin, De Niro played bounty hunter Jack Walsh. The film received amicable reception and was a commercial success, grossing $81 million worldwide. In his mixed review, Hal Hinson of The Washington Post wrote of De Niro:

De Niro has reduced himself in scale here, too, and it's a relief to see him drop the great-actor mantle, and the theatricality. As a result, he hasn't seemed as fresh since Mean Streets or New York, New York. Walsh is more of a character role than the ones he played in those films; there's less specificity in the conception – he's more of a type – but the actor fits into him snugly, effortlessly, and the chance to play comedy, particularly opposite a comic foil as ideal as Grodin, appears to have revitalized him.

He turned down an opportunity to play Jesus Christ in Scorsese's The Last Temptation of Christ (1988), although he told the director that he would do it as a favor if needed. Scorsese cast Willem Dafoe instead. In 1989, De Niro starred in several films that were not widely seen. He starred alongside Ed Harris and Kathy Baker in the drama Jacknife. The film revolves around the complex relationship between a Vietnam veteran, his sister and fellow army buddy. Next, he starred in the crime comedy We're No Angels (1989) with Sean Penn and Demi Moore, a remake of the 1955 film of the same name. The pair play escaped convicts who go on the run towards Canada. A year later, he starred in the romantic drama Stanley & Iris opposite Jane Fonda. Film critics did not receive We're No Angels or Stanley & Iris positively; modern review aggregator Rotten Tomatoes gives them approval ratings of 47% and 33%, respectively.

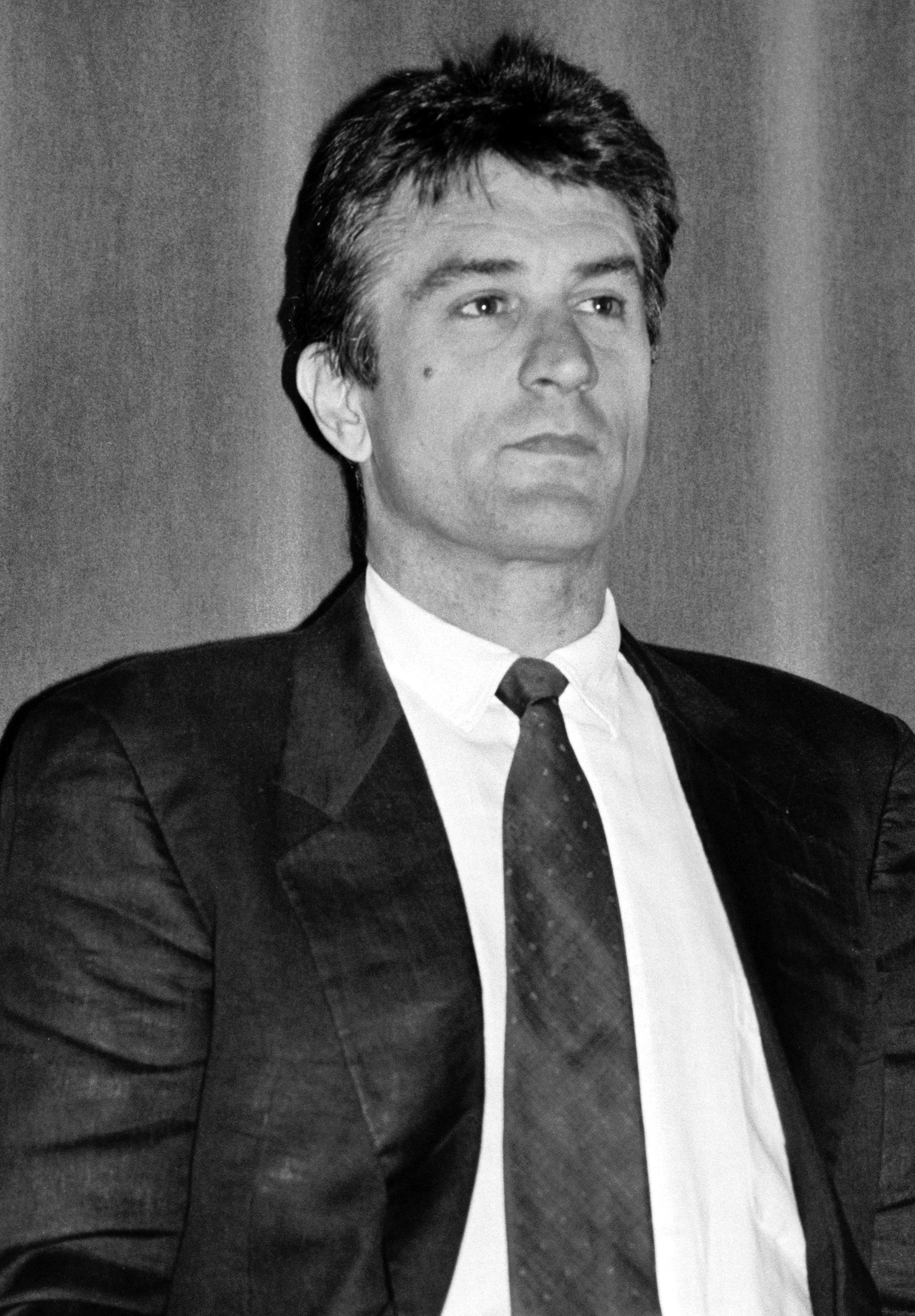
De Niro at the Deauville Film Festival, 1988

De Niro and Scorsese soon reunited for their sixth collaboration in 1990, with the crime film Goodfellas. It is an adaptation of the 1985 non-fiction book Wiseguy by Nicholas Pileggi. The film narrates the life of mob associate Henry Hill (Ray Liotta) and his friends and family from 1955 to 1980. De Niro played James Conway, an Irish truck carjacker and gangster. Goodfellas premiered at the 47th Venice International Film Festival to an "enthusiastic" response from Italian critics, although it grossed a moderate $46 million upon its wider release. Peter Travers, writing for Rolling Stone magazine, praised the cast performances, and called De Niro's character "a smooth killer acted with riveting restraint". Chicago Tribune's Gene Siskel was equally impressed by their improvised performances and concluded "easily one of the year's best films." In the awards season, the film was nominated for six Academy Awards, and De Niro was nominated for Best Actor at the BAFTAs. In 2007, the American Film Institute ranked it as the 92nd-greatest American film of all time in their 10th Anniversary Edition of the AFI's 100 Years...100 Movies list. Also in 1990, De Niro appeared in the lead role for Awakenings, directed by Penny Marshall. The drama, based on Oliver Sacks' 1973 book of the same title, tells the story of Dr. Malcolm Sayer (Robin Williams), who discovers benefits of the drug L-Dopa in 1969 and administers it to catatonic patients. The film was nominated for three Academy Awards, including Best Actor for De Niro. Sacks later remarked of the film: "I was pleased with a great deal of it. I think in an uncanny way, De Niro did somehow feel his way into being Parkinsonian. [...] At other levels I think things were sort of sentimentalized and simplified somewhat."

De Niro as Max Cady in Cape Fear, a role in which he was nominated for the Academy Award for Best Actor.

De Niro's next film project was the drama Guilty by Suspicion (1991) in which he plays David Merrill, a fictitious film director, returning to the U.S. during the McCarthy era and Hollywood blacklist. The film received generally favorable reviews. He then had a minor role in the mystery drama Backdraft (1991), playing a veteran fire inspector. De Niro's biggest success of 1991 was Cape Fear, his seventh film with Scorsese and a remake of the 1962 film of the same name. De Niro portrays convicted rapist Max Cady, who seeks revenge against a former public defender who originally defended him. De Niro's performance was widely lauded. David Ansen of Newsweek remarked that De Niro "dominates the film with his lip-smacking, blackly comic and terrifying portrayal of psychopathic self-righteousness." The film grossed $182 million at the box office and earned De Niro a Best Actor nomination at the 64th Academy Awards.

=== 1992–1997: Directorial debut and crime dramas ===
In 1992, De Niro appeared in two films. The first, Mistress, is a comedy-drama in which he played ruthless businessman Evan Wright. Of his performance, the critic from The Independent called De Niro "more urbane and coherent than we've seen him for a while." Irwin Winkler's Night and the City was his second release, a crime drama remake of the 1950 film noir of the same name. He was cast as New York lawyer Harry Fabian. Owen Gleiberman of Entertainment Weekly gave the film a rating of "B−" and was critical of De Niro: "The actor who once got so far inside his roles that he just about detonated the screen – now plays characters who don't seem to have any inner life at all." Next, he served as a producer for the mystery thriller Thunderheart (1992). In 1993, he played crime scene photographer Wayne Dobie in the comedy drama Mad Dog and Glory with co-stars Uma Thurman and Bill Murray. The feature received reasonable reviews and was lauded for the chemistry between De Niro and Murray; The Washington Post critic noted that their "real-life friendship spills over into this jittery, very funny look at the male bonding experience." Next, De Niro starred in the coming-of-age film This Boy's Life (1993), based on the memoir of the same name by Tobias Wolff. It features Ellen Barkin and Leonardo DiCaprio. Playing stepfather Dwight Hansen of Wolff (DiCaprio), the film was mostly well received, although Timeout magazine believed that "DiCaprio steals the show".

De Niro starred in his directorial debut, A Bronx Tale (1993), a coming-of-age story about an Italian-American boy who is torn between the temptations of organized crime, racism in his community, and the values of his decent father. The film also stars Chazz Palminteri, who wrote the play of the same name, and is based on his childhood. A Bronx Tale premiered at the Toronto International Film Festival to a positive response; Marjorie Baumgarten of The Austin Chronicle wrote "De Niro's choices as a director all seem prudent and un-showy, designed to draw attention to the characters and the story rather than its technical assemblage and much-lauded star." Variety magazine's Todd McCarthy took issue with the film's slow start but complimented De Niro's "impressive sensitivity to the irrational roots of racism and violence." A year later, De Niro was cast in the lead role of Mary Shelley's Frankenstein, an adaptation of Mary Shelley's 1818 novel Frankenstein. Although the film was commercially successful, earning $112 million worldwide, the general consensus of reviews were largely negative. Film critic James Berardinelli opined that it was entertaining and De Niro gave a strong performance, despite the film's "frantic" pace.

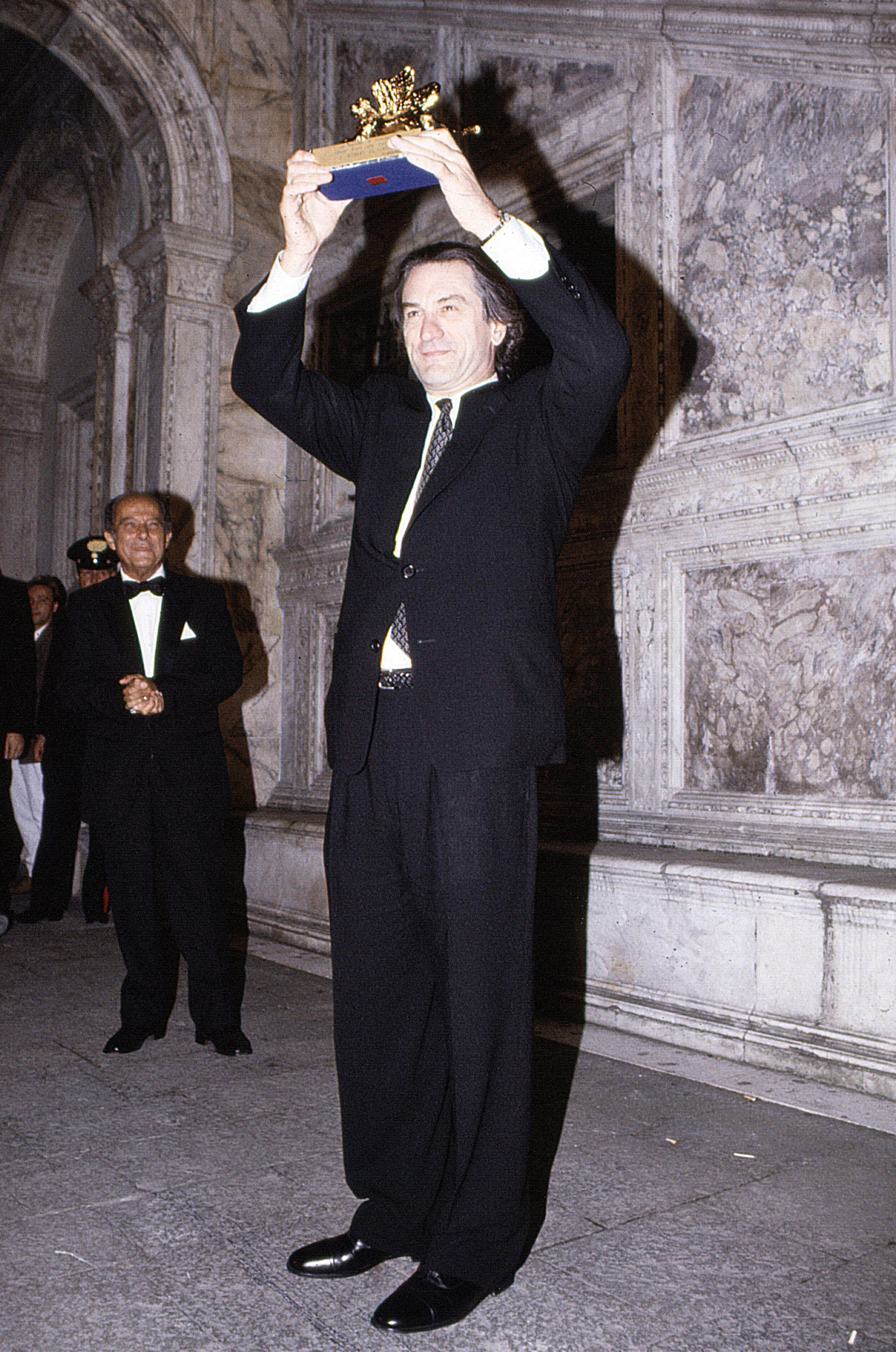
De Niro at the Venice Film Festival, 1993

Casino (1995) marked De Niro's return to the crime genre with Scorsese in their eighth collaboration. Co-starring Sharon Stone and Joe Pesci, the film is based on the book Casino: Love and Honor in Las Vegas by Nicholas Pileggi. De Niro portrays Sam "Ace" Rothstein, a mob-connected casino operator in Las Vegas. The film's themes revolve around greed, betrayal, wealth, status, and murder that occur between two mobsters, Sam "Ace" Rothstein (De Niro) and Nicky Santoro (Pesci), and a trophy wife (Stone) over a gambling empire. Casino was released to mostly positive critical reception, and was a success at the worldwide box office. Roger Ebert was impressed with the lead performers' abilities to "inhabit their roles with unconscious assurance", and The Globe and Mail's critic thought "De Niro does an extraordinarily subtle job of capturing the paradox [...] that lie at the heart of this picture." Shortly afterwards, he starred in 1995's crime thriller Heat, about a group of professional bank robbers. Art Linson, who had previously produced films starring De Niro, sent him the script first. "It was very good, very strong, had a particular feel to it, a reality and authenticity", De Niro said. Co-starring Al Pacino, Val Kilmer, Tom Sizemore, and Jon Voight among others, the film was released to wide acclaim; Michael Wilmington of the Chicago Tribune wrote:

De Niro and Pacino redeem everything. In Heat, they represent a high postwar tradition for movie actors – the ones inspired by Marlon Brando, John Cassavetes and James Dean – who aren't afraid of emotion, who run right into the jaws of a scene to grab it. Like others from their generation – Jack Nicholson, Gene Hackman, Harvey Keitel – they have a keener slant on machismo. They easily explore its darker strata.

Heat marked the first time that Pacino and De Niro appeared on-screen together; they were both in The Godfather Part II but were never in any scenes together because the film takes place in two separate timelines. De Niro as Vito Corleone was in the past and Pacino as his son Michael was in the present.

In 1995, De Niro had minor roles in the French comedy One Hundred and One Nights and in the drama Panther. In 1996, De Niro starred in the sports thriller The Fan, based on the novel of the same name by Peter Abrahams. De Niro plays Gil Renard, a baseball fanatic who loses his sanity. His fiftieth film credit was in the crime drama Sleepers (1996), about four boys who become involved with crime, and are sentenced to a detention center where they are abused by guards, and seek vengeance upon release. De Niro plays priest Bobby Carillo, a father figure to the four boys. Afterwards, he appeared in Marvin's Room (1996) as Dr. Wallace Carter, who treats a woman (Diane Keaton) with leukemia. Writing for the British Empire magazine, Bob McCabe opined that "Performances are all eminently watchable [...] but the truncated feel robs the film of anything more than perfunctory pleasures." Also in 1996, De Niro co-produced the crime-comedy Faithful. In 1996 a video game produced by De Niro called 9: The Last Resort was released. A surreal point and click puzzle game about a hotel filled with strange characters. De Niro met the game's director Buzz Hayes when Hayes worked at Lucasfilm. The game did not do well at launch and Hayes is quoted as saying "I wouldn't call it a failure. it was just kind of a quiet landing."

The following year, he appeared in James Mangold's Cop Land (1997), a crime-drama co-starring Sylvester Stallone, Harvey Keitel and Ray Liotta. De Niro plays Internal Affairs investigator Lt. Moe Tilden, who explores police corruption in a New Jersey town. The film opened to a generally warm response, although Barbara Shulgasser of San Francisco Examiner criticized De Niro's acting in certain scenes, suggesting Mangold put De Niro in a "manufactured situation", preventing him from realizing his full potential. De Niro co-starred and co-produced Wag the Dog (1997). The film is a political satire about a biased publicist (De Niro) and a Hollywood producer (Dustin Hoffman) who fabricate a war in Albania to cover up a U.S. president's sex scandal. In January 1998, a month after its release, the Clinton–Lewinsky scandal dominated the headlines, which helped the film generate publicity. As a result, Wag the Dog was well-received and made the list of Roger Ebert's ten best films of 1997. De Niro also had a supporting role in Quentin Tarantino's Jackie Brown in that same year.

=== 1998–2006: Comic roles, thrillers, and career slump ===
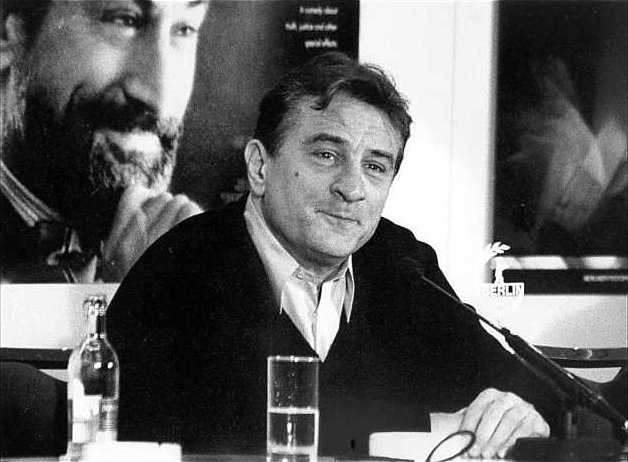
De Niro in 1998

De Niro began 1998 with an appearance in Great Expectations, a modern adaptation of Charles Dickens' 1861 novel of the same name, in which he played Arthur Lustig. Later that year, his next major role came in Ronin (1998), about a team of former special operatives that are hired to steal a mysterious briefcase while navigating a maze of shifting loyalties. De Niro plays Sam, an American mercenary formerly associated with the CIA. Ronin premiered at the 1998 Venice Film Festival to favorable response; Janet Maslin of The New York Times praised De Niro's confident portrayal as an action hero. In 1999, De Niro ventured back into crime-comedy; he was cast as an insecure mob boss opposite Billy Crystal and Lisa Kudrow in Harold Ramis' Analyze This. The film was a box office hit, earning $176 million worldwide, and De Niro was nominated for Best Actor at the Golden Globes. In Flawless (1999), De Niro appeared as a homophobic police officer, who suffers a stroke, and is assigned to a rehabilitative program with a gay singer. The critic from the BBC gave the film 3 out of 5 stars, and thought De Niro gave a "refreshingly low-key" performance, in comparison to his previous work.

In 2000, De Niro produced and starred in his first live-action animation comedy, The Adventures of Rocky and Bullwinkle. He voiced the character Fearless Leader, who is a dictator and employer of two mobsters. The film was critically panned, with Rotten Tomatoes giving the film a 43% approval rating. De Niro played Master Chief 'Billy' Sunday in the biographical drama Men of Honor (2000), based on the life of Carl Brashear, the first African-American to become a U.S. Navy Master Diver. Although the film garnered mixed reviews, Bob Thomas of the Associated Press wrote "De Niro infuses the role with all his dynamism. It is his best performance in years." That same year, he starred in the comedy Meet the Parents opposite Ben Stiller as Jack Byrnes, a former CIA operative who takes a dislike to Stiller's character. De Niro, who had been seeking comic roles at the time, was encouraged by his producing partner Jane Rosenthal, to take on the role. The film was a high earner at the box office, with $330 million in receipts. Film critics welcomed De Niro's transition as a comic actor and ability to make audiences laugh.

After several comedies, De Niro landed a lead role in the crime thriller 15 Minutes (2001), a story about a homicide detective (De Niro) and a fire marshal (Edward Burns) who join forces to apprehend a pair of Eastern European murderers. The film's reception was generally unfavorable; William Arnold of the Seattle Post-Intelligencer took issue with the "in-your-face exaggeration", but he thought De Niro delivered "his usual edgy flair, [...] on the mean streets of his native Manhattan." De Niro followed up with a heist, in Frank Oz's The Score (2001), starring Edward Norton, Angela Bassett and Marlon Brando. He plays a retiring thief when a young man (Norton) persuades him into doing one last heist together. Upon release, The Score fared well with critics, although Peter Rainer of New York magazine did not think the film challenged De Niro or fully utilize his talents. The next year, he played an LAPD detective opposite Eddie Murphy in the action-comedy Showtime. The reviewer from LA Weekly remarked "De Niro isn't actually playing a part but riffing on his own legend", and thought the references to Taxi Driver were "cheap".

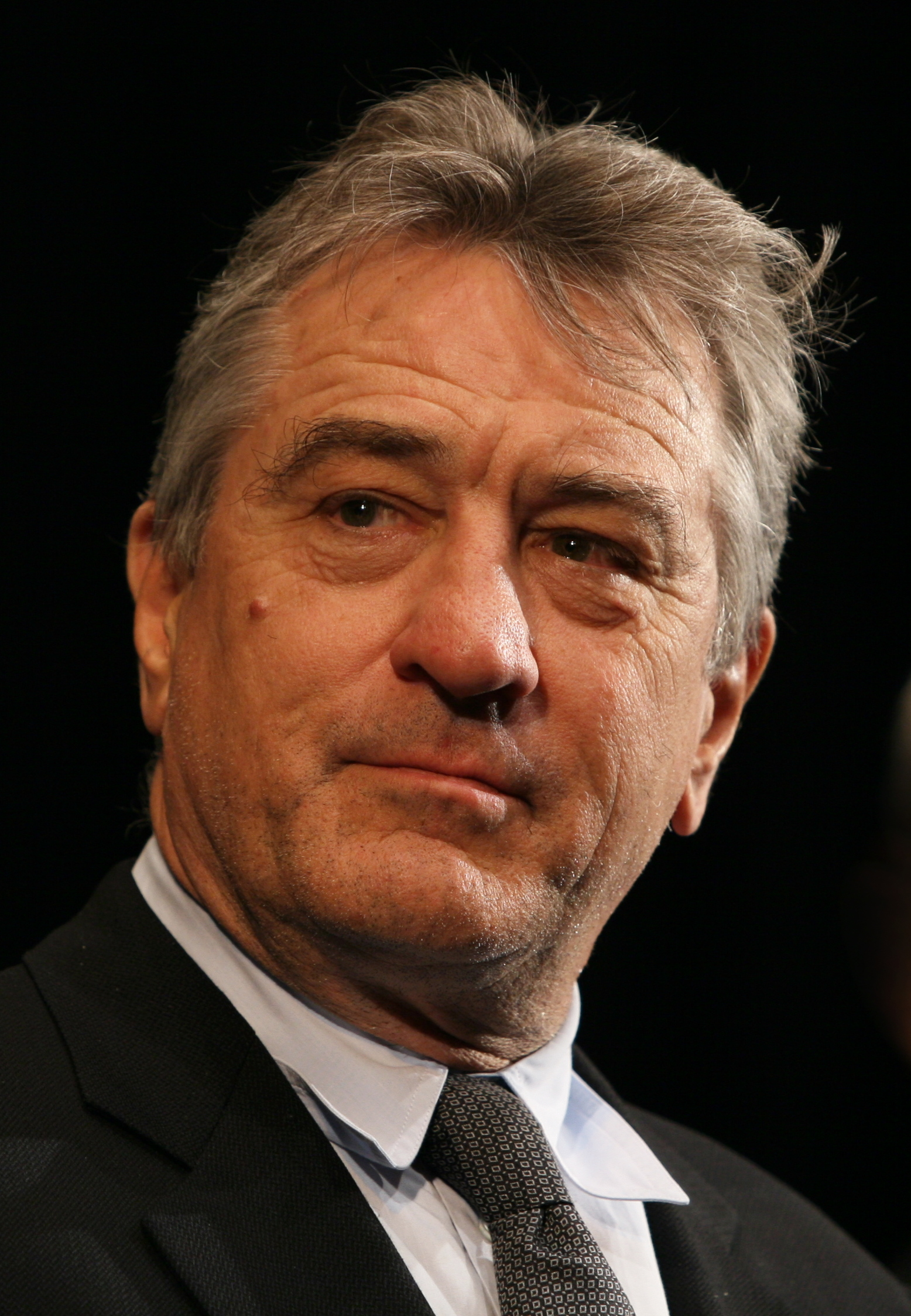
De Niro at the Karlovy Vary International Film Festival, 2008

Also in 2002, he collaborated with Michael Caton-Jones in City by the Sea, who had previously directed De Niro in This Boy's Life. Starring opposite Frances McDormand and James Franco, he portrayed another police detective in the drama. The film received mixed reviews and under-performed at the theaters. He appeared in Analyze That (2002), a sequel to 1999's Analyze This. Filming began in New York City, seven months after the September 11 attacks. De Niro insisted on filming there, stating "It's a New York story, a New York movie. We always intended to keep it there and I'm glad we were able to do it." Upon release, most critics thought the sequel was weak; CNN's Paul Clinton remarked "Unfortunately the result is just a bunch of one-liners strung together, of which some work and some don't. The actual story never gets off the ground." Despite these failures, De Niro served as a producer for the critically acclaimed romantic-comedy About a Boy (2002), and appeared in 9/11 (2002), a CBS documentary about the September 11 attacks, told from the New York City fire department's point of view.

Several critics consider De Niro's career as having begun to slump in the early 2000s, with De Niro starring in roles that were less dramatic than those in the previous decade. He returned to the screen in 2004, playing a doctor in the fantasy drama Godsend. As of 2020, the film is De Niro's poorest-performing work; Rotten Tomatoes gave the film an approval rating of 4% based on 139 critic reviews. He voiced a character in DreamWorks' animation of Shark Tale (2004). Most critics were also unimpressed, but it was a high earner at the box office. After co-producing Stage Beauty (2004), De Niro reprised his role of Jack Byrnes in 2004's Meet the Fockers, the sequel to Meet the Parents. In a scathing review of De Niro, the critic from Slant Magazine wrote "In self-parody mode for the umpteenth time, De Niro mugs for the camera with a series of overblown grimaces and faux-menacing glares." The Bridge of San Luis Rey, was De Niro's last release of 2004, based on Thornton Wilder's novel of the same name. It was also critically panned.

In 2005, De Niro starred in the horror Hide and Seek opposite Dakota Fanning, playing Dr. David Callaway who leaves the city with his traumatized daughter after the mother's suicide. Although the film was a financial success, some critics thought De Niro had been miscast, and queried his decision to star in a mediocre feature. In 2006, De Niro turned down a role in The Departed to direct his second film, the spy thriller The Good Shepherd, a fictional account about the growth of the CIA during its formative years. The film reunited him onscreen with Joe Pesci, co-star from Raging Bull, Goodfellas, A Bronx Tale, Casino, among others. Based on the screenplay by Eric Roth, the project was personal for De Niro, who was raised during the Cold War and fascinated by it. Despite starring some of Hollywood's leading actors; Matt Damon, Angelina Jolie and Alec Baldwin, the film garnered a mixed reception. Writing for The Sydney Morning Herald, Sandra Hall noted its slow pace, stating "There's a potentially fascinating slice of American history here, but De Niro has carved it up with an excruciatingly dull knife." The critic from USA Today found the plot initially hard to follow, but praises De Niro for "creating a stirring personal tale". The Good Shepherd was nominated for Best Art Direction at the 79th Academy Awards. Finally in 2006, he voiced the character Emperor Sifrat XVI in Arthur and the Invisibles.

=== 2007–2016: Further film roles ===
His sole project in 2007 was Matthew Vaughn's Stardust, a fantasy adventure, based on Neil Gaiman's 1999 novel of the same name. He plays Captain Shakespeare, the leader of a ship. The film was generally well received, although one critic from New York magazine thought De Niro's performance was "god-awful – yet his gung-ho spirit wins him Brownie points." The following year, he starred in the police procedural thriller Righteous Kill opposite Al Pacino, both playing New York City detectives who investigate serial executions of criminals who escaped justice. The film's response was mainly disappointing; Peter Hartlaub of San Francisco Chronicle thought the story was unoriginal and De Niro lacked energy. The film grossed $78 million from a budget of $60 million. Next, he starred in What Just Happened (2008), a satirical comedy based on Art Linson's experiences as a producer in Hollywood. The film was screened at the 2008 Cannes Film Festival as an out-of-competition entry. The Sydney Morning Herald opined that most reviewers gave the film a lukewarm reception because of the character he plays, which is "sympathetic" and quieter than his earlier roles. In 2009, he was cast as Frank Goode in the drama Everybody's Fine, a remake of Giuseppe Tornatore's Italian film of the same name. Although the film's response was equally mixed, The Guardian's critic praised De Niro for a "his first decent, watchable performance in quite a while."

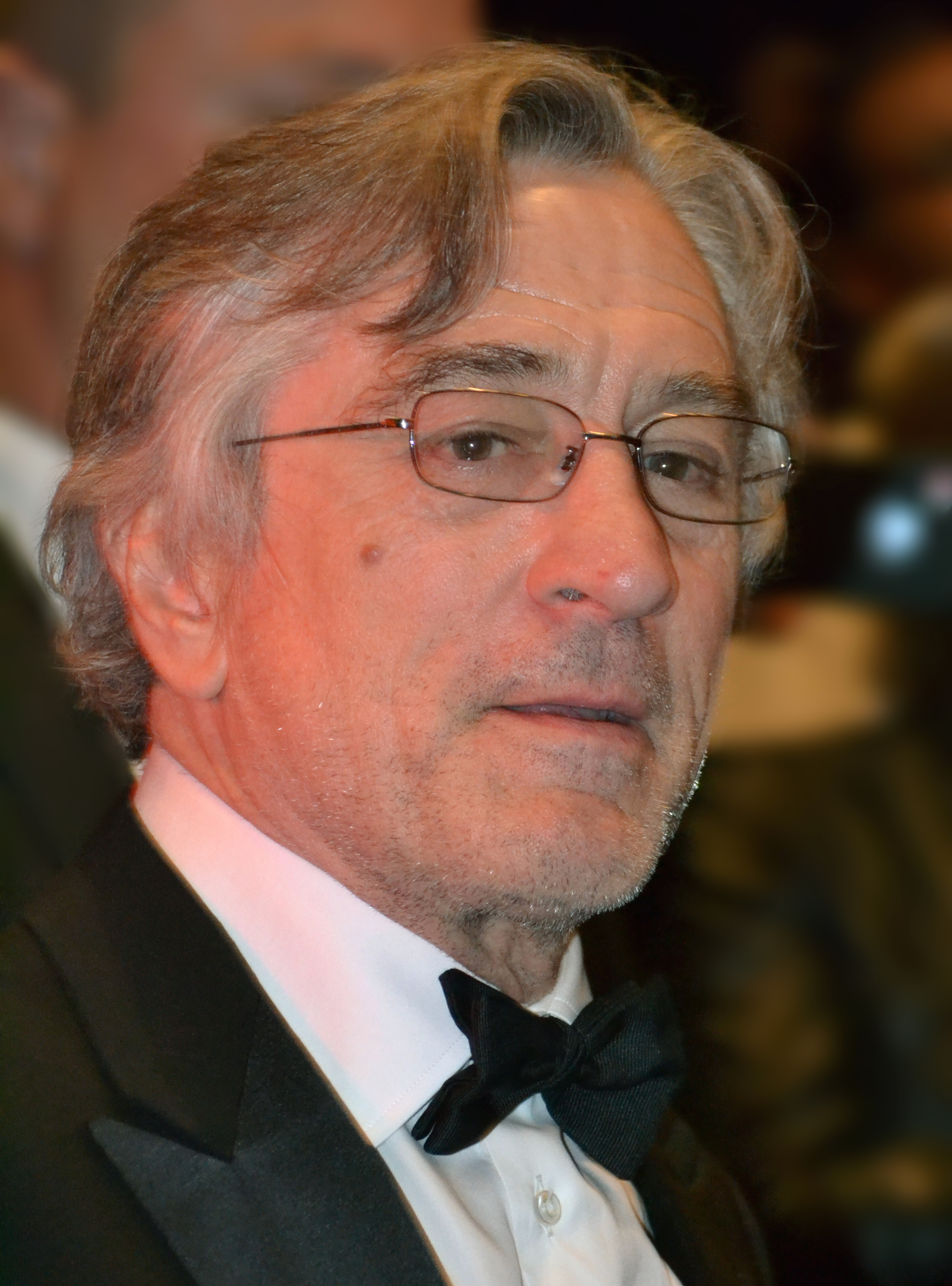
De Niro at the Cannes Film Festival, 2011

In 2010, he had a minor part as Senator John McLaughlin in the action film Machete. That same year, he starred in Stone opposite Milla Jovovich and Edward Norton, co-star from The Score. It is a crime drama where De Niro plays a manipulated parole officer. The film was met with a divided reception; Toronto Star's critic thought De Niro delivered a respectable performance due to Jovovich's support. Another critic, Jesse Cataldo from Slant Magazine noted the film's restraint and thought De Niro is repeating himself by playing the same basic characters. Next he starred in Little Fockers (2010), the second sequel to Meet the Parents and Meet the Fockers. Despite universally negative reviews from critics, the film was a box office success, grossing over $310 million worldwide. In one review, The Daily Telegraph wrote "Despite the farcical script, De Niro in particular has his paterfamilias character sensitively tuned". That year, De Niro was cast in Edge of Darkness, but he left the project citing creative differences. He was replaced by Ray Winstone.

In 2011, De Niro starred in the Italian comedy Manuale d'amore 3. He also appeared in three other films: Killer Elite, Limitless, and New Year's Eve. Except for Limitless, which received an approval rating of 69% from Rotten Tomatoes, the other two films were met with mixed-to-negative reviews. De Niro was also appointed president of the jury for the 2011 Cannes Film Festival, making it the second time he has served. Continuing into 2012, he starred in the drama Being Flynn, based on Another Bullshit Night in Suck City, a memoir by Nick Flynn. It was met with a mixed response; critic A. O. Scott complimented De Niro's ability for playing an estranged father (opposite Paul Dano), calling him "unpredictable and subtle", despite an uncertain plot. De Niro also appeared in the thrillers Red Lights and Freelancers (both 2012).

De Niro made his first appearance in a David O. Russell film, in the romantic comedy Silver Linings Playbook (2012), as the father of Pat Solatano (Bradley Cooper), who is released from a psychiatric hospital and moves back in with his parents to rebuild his life. The film was a critical and commercial success, earning eight Academy Award nominations, including Best Supporting Actor for De Niro. The film grossed $236 million worldwide. Critics lauded the entire cast; Variety magazine's Justin Chang noted De Niro's calm performance, writing "it's hard to remember the last time De Niro was this effortlessly endearing and relaxed onscreen." In 2013, he played a one-scene uncredited cameo role in Russell's ten-time Oscar-nominated American Hustle as mob boss Victor Tellegio. In 2012, De Niro served as an executive producer for the television series NYC 22.

Next, he was cast in 2013's The Big Wedding, Killing Season, and The Family; all three were met with mainly a negative response. His other 2013 release, Last Vegas, received some respectable reviews. Co-starring Michael Douglas, Morgan Freeman, Kevin Kline and Mary Steenburgen, the film is about three retirees who travel to Las Vegas to have a bachelor party for their last remaining single friend. In a harsh assessment of De Niro's performance, the A.V. Club's critic considered it "arguably the low point of De Niro's career." Shortly afterwards, he starred in Grudge Match (2013) opposite Sylvester Stallone, as aging boxers stepping into the ring for one last match. They had previously worked together in 1997's Cop Land. That same year he starred in the crime thriller, The Bag Man. In 2014, De Niro appeared in a documentary about his father, Robert De Niro Sr., titled Remembering the Artist Robert De Niro Sr. which aired on HBO. In 2015, he starred in Nancy Meyers' comedy The Intern alongside Anne Hathaway. The latter fared better with critics; Mark Olsen of the Los Angeles Times cordially remarked "De Niro brings a fresh, relaxed lightness to his performance, tinged with the gruff charm of Spencer Tracy." His performance won him a nomination from the Critics Choice Movie Awards for Best Actor in a Comedy.

Also in 2015, he appeared in two short films, Scorsese's The Audition and JR's Ellis. Returning to the heist genre, he starred in Heist, playing Francis "The Pope" Silva, a gangster casino owner who is targeted by criminals. The film was not a box office success. He starred in the biographical drama Joy (2015), opposite Jennifer Lawrence and Bradley Cooper, about an American inventor Joy Mangano; it gained generally mixed reviews. In 2016, he co-starred in Dirty Grandpa, playing a grandfather who goes to Florida during spring break with his grandson (Zac Efron). Upon release, the film received a polarized reception for its reputedly distasteful content, and appeared in several critics' lists of worst films of 2016. He also appeared in Hands of Stone (2016), a biographical sports drama about the career of Panamanian former professional boxer Roberto Durán. His last release of the year was The Comedian, which premiered at the AFI Fest, a film festival celebrating filmmakers' achievements.

=== 2017–present: Career resurgence and reunion with Scorsese ===
In 2017, De Niro starred as Bernie Madoff in Barry Levinson's HBO film The Wizard of Lies, a performance which earned him critical praise and a Primetime Emmy Award nomination for Outstanding Lead Actor in a Limited Series or Television Movie. In 2019, De Niro won acclaim for portraying Robert Mueller alongside Alec Baldwin's Donald Trump in various episodes of Saturday Night Live, earning him an Emmy nomination for Outstanding Guest Actor in a Comedy Series. He received another Emmy Award nomination for Outstanding Limited Series his work as a producer on Ava DuVernay's acclaimed historical miniseries When They See Us for Netflix.

In 2019, De Niro returned to the screen by playing talk show host Murray Franklin in Todd Phillips' Joker, a possible origin story for the Batman character The Joker (Joaquin Phoenix). The film was a commercial success, and earned eleven nominations at the Academy Awards. Also that year, De Niro reunited with Scorsese for The Irishman, based on the 2004 book I Heard You Paint Houses by Charles Brandt. It is their ninth feature film together and the first since 1995's Casino, and co-stars Al Pacino, Harvey Keitel, and Joe Pesci. The film received critical acclaim; Robbie Collin of The Daily Telegraph, praised De Niro's "sensational" performance and the chemistry between his co-stars, whom he has worked with in earlier films. Variety magazine's critic also noted the chemistry, calling him "superb", despite perceived weaknesses in the film's special effects.

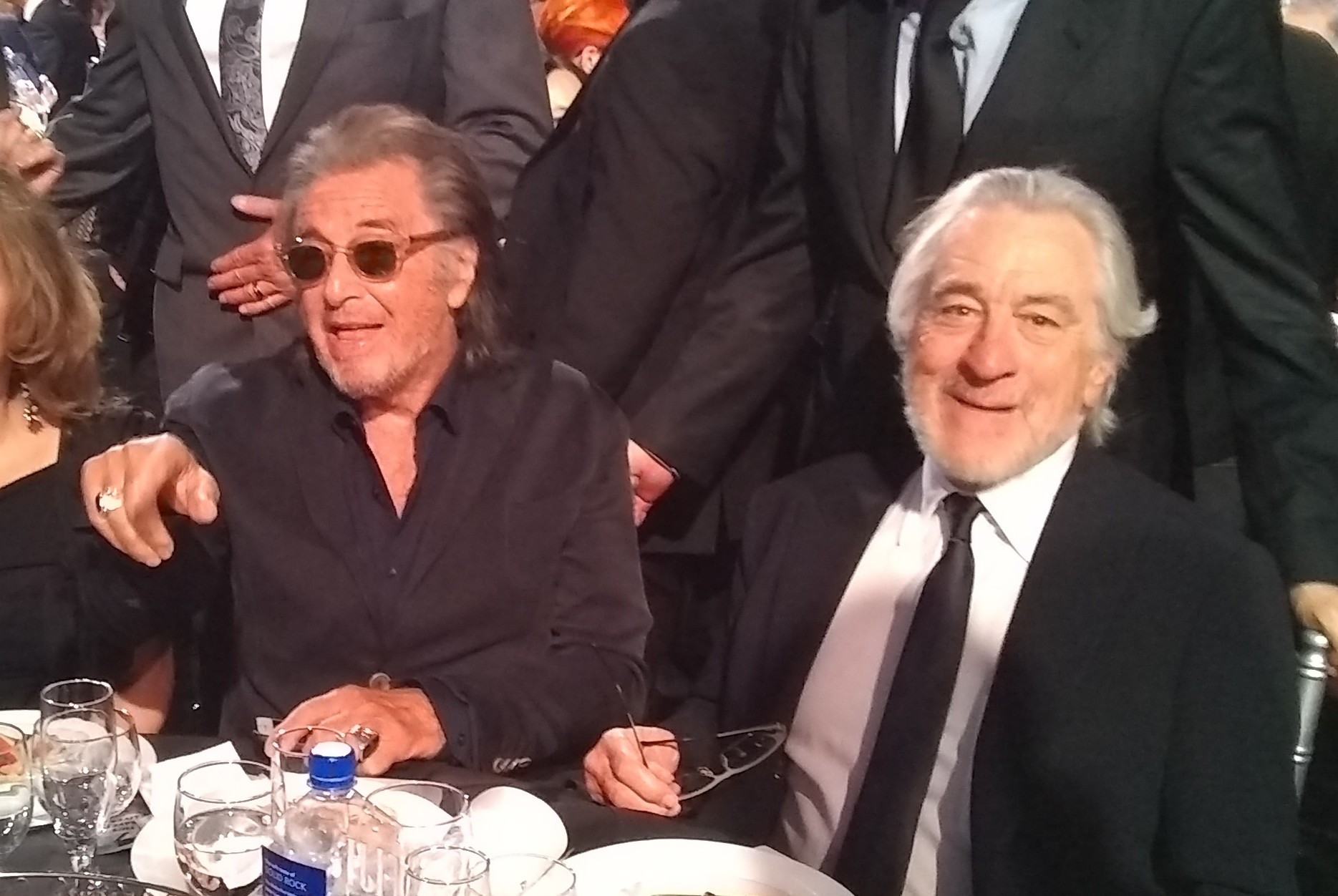
De Niro (right) and Al Pacino during the 25th Critics' Choice Awards in January 2020

In September 2020, De Niro appeared in Nancy Meyers' comedy short film Father of the Bride Part 3(ish). The short co-starred Diane Keaton, Steve Martin, Kieran Culkin, Martin Short and Florence Pugh. Also in that year, De Niro appeared in The Comeback Trail, a crime comedy directed by George Gallo. De Niro was cast in James Gray's period drama Armageddon Time, but he dropped out of the project by the time production began. In January 2021, De Niro signed on for the historical comedy Amsterdam, playing an army veteran. Released in October 2022, the ensemble includes Christian Bale, Margot Robbie, John David Washington, Michael Shannon, Mike Myers, Timothy Olyphant and Anya Taylor-Joy. The reviewer from South China Morning Post thought De Niro "brings just the right gravitas to his decorated general." In August 2022, De Niro signed on to star in the Warner Bros. mob drama The Alto Knights, directed by Barry Levinson. De Niro appeared in Savage Salvation as Sheriff Church, which was released on December 2, 2022.

In 2023, De Niro played William King Hale, a cattleman and perpetrator of the Osage Indian murders, in Killers of the Flower Moon, directed by Scorsese and adapted from the book of the same name by David Grann. He starred alongside Leonardo DiCaprio and Lily Gladstone. It was reported that the film's budget of $200 million had prompted Scorsese to seek Netflix or Apple TV+ for production and distribution, and in May 2020, Apple TV+ was announced to co-finance and co-distribute the film with Paramount. De Niro received an Academy Award for Best Supporting Actor nomination for the role. Niles Schulz praised the performance as "one of De Niro's best", evoking "a figure of beguiling charm, with a good humor that cloaks bottomless indifference."

In 2023, De Niro also appeared in the comedy About My Father, and in the television series Nada. On March 1, 2023, it was announced that De Niro will produce and star in the six-episode limited series Zero Day for Netflix, a conspiracy thriller created by Eric Newman and Noah Oppenheim, who will also executive produce along with Jonathan Glickman. The series premiered in 2025. Another film he starred in, Ezra, made its premiere at Toronto International Film Festival 2023 and was acquired by Bleecker Street for theatrical release in 2024. De Niro said he took interest in the film as it features the complexities of parenting an autistic child; De Niro has an autistic son himself.

De Niro was due to receive a leadership award from the National Association of Broadcasters in 2024, before the honour was withdrawn following De Niro's criticism of Donald Trump outside the former President's criminal trial in New York.

== Reception and legacy ==
Several journalists consider De Niro to be among the best actors of his generation. John Naughton of GQ magazine believes that De Niro has "redefined what we can expect of an actor." A. O. Scott said that De Niro "was transforming himself – physically, vocally, psychologically – with each new role. And in the process, before our eyes, reinventing the art of acting." As early as 1977, Newsweek remarked that the actor "gives you the shock of becoming, of a metamorphosis that can be thrilling, moving, or frightening." Biographer Douglas Brode praises De Niro's versatility and ability to inhabit any role, although Pauline Kael once said in 1983 that she did not like how the actor was "disfiguring" himself in films such as Raging Bull. When asked why he undertook such roles, De Niro responded, "To totally submerge into another character and experience life through him, without having to risk the real-life consequences—well it's a cheap way to do doing things that you would never dare to do yourself."

In 2009, he was announced as one of the Kennedy Center Honorees with the commemoration: "One of America's greatest cinematic actors, Robert De Niro has demonstrated a legendary commitment to his characters and has co-founded one of the world's major film festivals." Martin Scorsese and Meryl Streep honored him at the event. In 2016, he received the Presidential Medal of Freedom from President Barack Obama. Obama said "Everybody on this stage has touched me in a very powerful, very personal way [...] These are folks who have helped make me who I am." White House Press Secretary Josh Earnest added, "There is no arguing that the individuals who will be honored today are richly deserving", he said.

Many of De Niro's films have become classics of American cinema, in which six of them have been inducted into the U.S. National Film Registry as of 2022. Five films are featured on the American Film Institute's (AFI) list of the 100 greatest American films of all time. De Niro and James Stewart share the title for the most films represented on the AFI list. In 2006, De Niro donated his collection of film-related materials, such as scripts, wardrobe pieces and props, to the Harry Ransom Center at the University of Texas at Austin. The collection, which took more than two years to process and catalog, opened to the public in 2009. Time Out magazine's list of 100 best movies included seven of De Niro's films, as chosen by actors in the industry. In May 2025, De Niro received the Cannes Film Festival's Honorary Palme d'Or.

Fan song
In 1984, the Irish-English girl group Bananarama's fan song "Robert De Niro's Waiting..." reached the third place of the UK singles chart, remaining on the charts for 12 weeks.

Honors

- 1993 – Venice Film Festival's Golden Lion for Lifetime Achievement
- 1997 – Moscow International Film Festival Honorable Prize
- 2001 – Gotham Award Lifetime Achievement Award
- 2003 – AFI Life Achievement Award and tribute
- 2009 – Kennedy Center Honors
- 2011 – Golden Globe Cecil B. DeMille Award
- 2013 – Santa Barbara International Film Festival Kirk Douglas Award
- 2016 – Presidential Medal of Freedom
- 2017 – Film Society of Lincoln Center Gala Tribute
- 2019 – National Board of Review Icon Award
- 2020 – Screen Actors Guild Life Achievement Award
- 2025 — Cannes Film Festival's Honorary Palme d'Or

== Business interests ==
In 1989, De Niro and partner Jane Rosenthal co-founded the film production company TriBeCa Productions, which also organizes the Tribeca Film Festival. De Niro owned Tribeca Grill (co-owned with Broadway producer Stewart F. Lane), a New American restaurant located at 375 Greenwich Street (at Franklin Street) in Tribeca, Manhattan. It opened in 1990. He is also the owner of the Greenwich Hotel in Tribeca. De Niro co-owns Nobu restaurants and hotels with partners Meir Teper and Chef Nobu Matsuhisa. The first Nobu Hotel opened inside Caesars Palace, Las Vegas, in 2013. Two years later, the second Nobu Hotel opened at City of Dreams in Manila, Philippines. In 2015, De Niro partnered with James Packer after the billionaire acquired a 20 percent stake in Nobu for $100 million. He is a stakeholder in Paradise Found Nobu Resort, a company planning to build a luxury resort on the island of Barbuda.

== Personal life ==
De Niro is a long-term resident of New York City, and has been investing in Manhattan's Tribeca neighborhood since 1989. He has properties on the east and west sides of Manhattan. He also has a 78-acre (32-hectare) estate in Gardiner, New York, which serves as his primary residence.

In 1998, De Niro lobbied U.S. Congress against impeaching President Bill Clinton.

In October 2003, De Niro was diagnosed with prostate cancer. He underwent surgery at the Memorial Sloan Kettering Cancer Center in December 2003.

In 2006, De Niro received Italian citizenship, despite opposition by the Sons of Italy, who believe that De Niro damaged the public image of Italians by portraying criminals.

In 2012, De Niro joined the anti-fracking campaign Artists Against Fracking.

In 2013, De Niro attended Israeli president Shimon Peres's 90th birthday celebration, as well as the Israeli Presidential conference. He praised Peres as "a great person, [and] a great statesman."

In 2016, De Niro initially defended the inclusion of a controversial documentary, Vaxxed, at the 2016 Tribeca Film Festival; the film was directed and co-written by discredited anti-vaccine activist Andrew Wakefield and echoed Wakefield's fraudulent claim that there was a causal link between the MMR vaccine and autism. De Niro explained that his interest in the film was from his personal experience with his autistic son, Elliot. The film was withdrawn from the schedule after consultation with the festival organizers and scientific community. During a subsequent appearance on NBC's Today, De Niro expressed regret that he agreed to exclude Vaxxed from the festival and stated, "I think the movie is something that people should see." Also during the appearance, De Niro promoted the 2014 anti-vaccination film Trace Amounts and stated that he doubted the scientific consensus that there was no link between autism and vaccines. In February 2017, De Niro took part in a joint presentation with Robert F. Kennedy Jr., chairman of the anti-vaccine non-profit Children's Health Defense, to discuss their concerns with vaccine safety. De Niro has stated that he is not anti-vaccination, but does question their efficacy.

Later in 2016, De Niro attended an annual celebrity gala for the Friends of the Israel Defense Forces at the Beverly Hilton in Los Angeles. The event raised $38 million for the organization.

In October 2018, De Niro was targeted by an explosive device. The device was found at the Tribeca Grill, which also houses his production company in Manhattan. According to the FBI, similar devices were sent to high-profile politicians including Barack Obama, Hillary Clinton, Joe Biden, former Attorney General Eric Holder, and former CIA Director John Brennan.

De Niro was a supporter of President Joe Biden for re-election in 2024, and backed Vice President Kamala Harris's campaign after Biden dropped out of the race. He had previously criticized President Donald Trump, calling him a "buffoon", believing that he could become a "vicious dictator" and comparing his politics to fascism.

=== Relationships ===
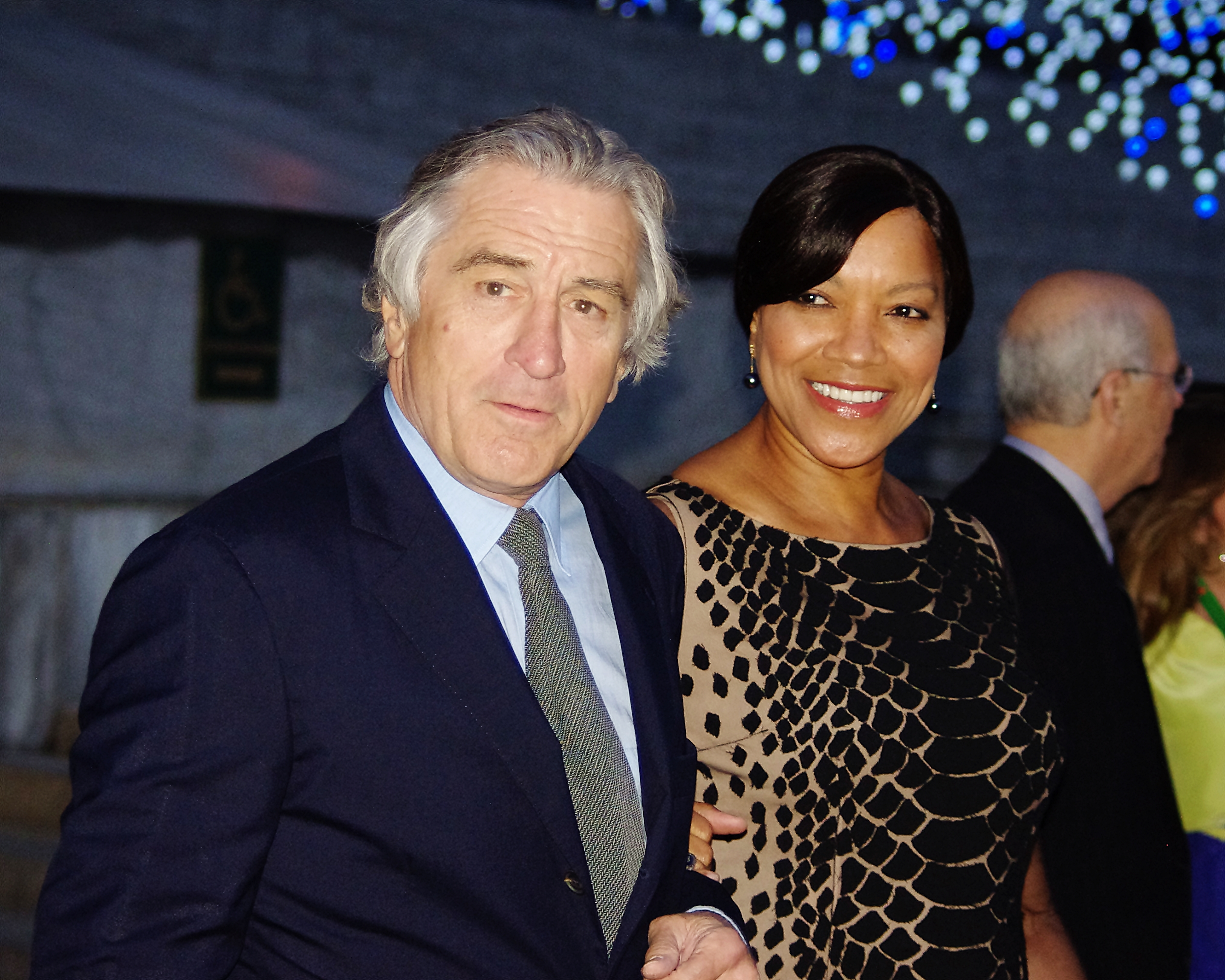
De Niro with Grace Hightower in April 2012

De Niro married actress Diahnne Abbott in 1976. They have a son, Raphael, a former actor who works in New York real estate. De Niro also adopted Abbott's daughter, Drena, from a previous relationship. He and Abbott divorced in 1988.

De Niro was in a relationship with model Toukie Smith from 1988 to 1996. The couple has twins, son Julian and daughter Airyn, conceived by in vitro fertilization and delivered by a surrogate mother in 1995. Airyn came out as a trans woman in April 2025, and Robert stated that he supported her identity.

In 1997, De Niro married actress Grace Hightower. Their son, Elliot, was born in 1998, and the couple split in 1999. A divorce was never finalized, and in 2004 they renewed their vows. In December 2011, their daughter, Helen, was born via surrogate. In 2014, he and Hightower moved into a 6,000-square-foot, five-bedroom apartment at 15 Central Park West. Four years later, De Niro and Hightower separated after 20 years of marriage. De Niro has four grandchildren: one from his daughter Drena and three from his son Raphael. On April 19, 2021, De Niro's lawyer argued in a virtual divorce hearing presided by a Manhattan judge that he is "working at an unsustainable pace" in order "to support Hightower and pay off all his back taxes." Hightower's lawyer claimed that since the pair filed for divorce in 2018, De Niro had been "unfairly decreasing" the agreed-upon payments to her.

In April 2023, De Niro welcomed his seventh child, a daughter, Gia, with his girlfriend, Tiffany Chen. Aged 79 at the time, De Niro became one of the oldest fathers on record.

In July 2023, it was announced that De Niro's grandson through his daughter Drena, Leandro De Niro Rodriguez, had died at age 19. The cause of death was determined as a combined drug intoxication involving fentanyl and cocaine.

=== Legal issues ===
In February 1998, De Niro was held for questioning by French police in connection with an international prostitution ring. De Niro denied any involvement and later filed a complaint against the examining magistrate for "violation of secrecy in an investigation". He stated he would not return to France but has since traveled there several times, including for the 2011 Cannes Film Festival.

In 1999, De Niro threatened to sue the owners of "De Niro's Supper Club" in Vancouver under section 3 of the BC Privacy Act. The restaurant subsequently changed its name to "Section (3)".

In 2006, the trust that owns De Niro's Gardiner estate sued the town to have its property tax assessment reduced, arguing that $6 million was too high and should be compared only with similar properties in Ulster County, where Gardiner is located. The town, which had been comparing its value with similar estates in Dutchess County, across the Hudson River, and Connecticut's Litchfield County, where many other affluent New York residents maintain estates on large properties, won in State Supreme Court. In 2014, the trust's lawyers appealed the decision, and the town was unsure whether it should continue to defend the suit, because of financial limitations in that it would have earned far less in payments on the increased taxes than it had spent on legal costs. This angered many residents, who initially sympathized with De Niro, and some proposed to raise money privately to help the town continue the suit. The dispute was publicized by The New York Times. "When he (De Niro) read about it on Election Day, he went bananas" due to the negative publicity, said Gardiner town councilman Warren Wiegand. He was unaware that a lawsuit had been filed; the trust's accountants took responsibility, citing fiduciary duty. Shortly afterward, De Niro's lawyer, Tom Harvey, contacted the town to settle the case, and the trust's accounting firm agreed to pay the town's $129,000 legal bill.

In August 2019, De Niro's company Canal Productions filed a $6-million lawsuit against former employee Graham Chase Robinson for breaching her fiduciary duties and violating New York's faithless servant doctrine by misusing company funds and watching hours of Netflix during work hours. In October 2019, Robinson filed a lawsuit against De Niro, claiming harassment and gender discrimination. In November 2023, a jury found De Niro not personally liable for gender discrimination, but his production company was ordered to pay Robinson $1.2 million in damages.

== Filmography and accolades ==
Prolific in film since the 1970s, De Niro's most critically acclaimed films, according to review aggregate site Rotten Tomatoes, are Bang the Drum Slowly (1973), Mean Streets (1973), The Godfather Part II (1974), Taxi Driver (1976), The Deer Hunter (1978), Raging Bull (1980), The King of Comedy (1983), Once Upon a Time in America (1984), Brazil (1985), The Mission (1986), Midnight Run (1988), Goodfellas (1990), Casino (1995), Heat (1995), Meet the Parents (2000), Silver Linings Playbook (2012), The Irishman (2019), and Killers of the Flower Moon (2023).

De Niro has been recognized by the Academy of Motion Picture Arts and Sciences for the following performances:

- 47th Academy Awards (1974): Best Supporting Actor, win, for The Godfather Part II
- 49th Academy Awards (1976): Best Actor, nomination, for Taxi Driver
- 51st Academy Awards (1978): Best Actor, nomination, for The Deer Hunter
- 53rd Academy Awards (1980): Best Actor, win, for Raging Bull
- 63rd Academy Awards (1990): Best Actor, nomination, for Awakenings
- 64th Academy Awards (1991): Best Actor, nomination, for Cape Fear
- 85th Academy Awards (2012): Best Supporting Actor, nomination, for Silver Linings Playbook
- 92nd Academy Awards (2019): Best Picture, nomination, for The Irishman
- 96th Academy Awards (2023): Best Supporting Actor, nomination, for Killers of the Flower Moon

De Niro has won two Golden Globe Awards: Best Actor – Motion Picture Drama for Raging Bull and a Cecil B. DeMille Award for "outstanding contributions to the world of entertainment." He was also the 56th recipient of SAG-AFTRA Life Achievement Award; Leonardo DiCaprio, who co-starred with De Niro in This Boy's Life, presented him the award, citing him as an inspiration and influence.

On May 13, 2025, De Niro received the Honorary Palme d'Or at the Cannes Film Festival, celebrating his five-decade career in cinema.
