= SAG-AFTRA Life Achievement Award =

Film industry award

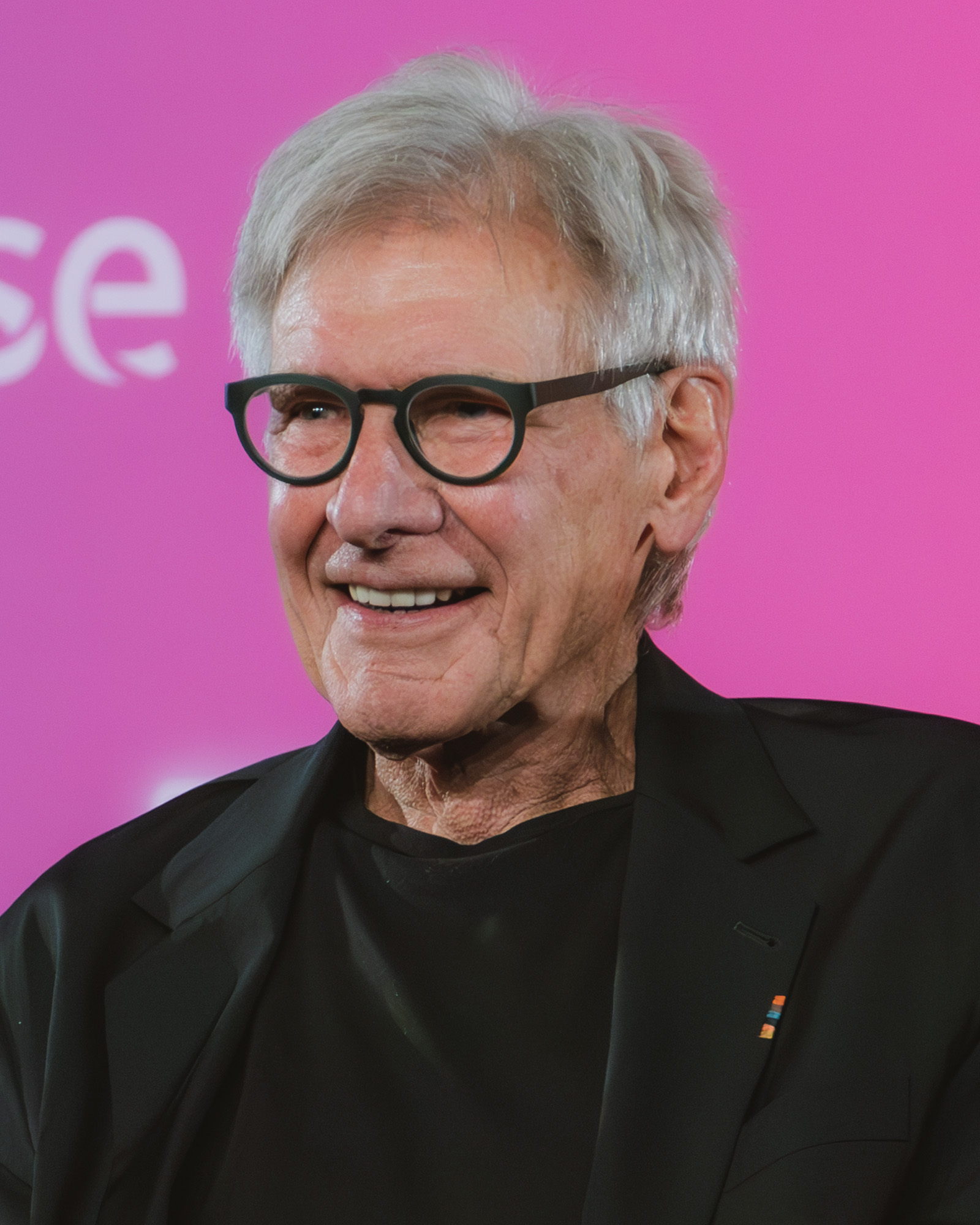
- The 2025 recipient: Harrison Ford
- Awarded for: "outstanding achievement in fostering the finest ideals of the acting profession"
- Country: United States
- Presented by: SAG-AFTRA
- Formerly called: Screen Actors Guild Life Achievement Award
- First award: 1962
- Currently held by: Harrison Ford (2025)
- Website: sagawards.org

The SAG-AFTRA Life Achievement Award (formerly the Screen Actors Guild Life Achievement Award) is presented by the Screen Actors Guild's National Honors and Tributes Committee for "outstanding achievement in fostering the finest ideals of the acting profession." It predates the 1st Screen Actors Guild Awards by over thirty years. The award's first recipient was performer and comedian Eddie Cantor, in 1962. Since then, it has been presented every year except 1963, 1981 and 2021. On two occasions, two people received the award the same year: in 1985, when it was presented to actor Paul Newman and actress Joanne Woodward, and in 2000, when it was presented to civil rights activists Ossie Davis and Ruby Dee. The award was not given in 2020 due to the COVID-19 pandemic. As of 2025, 63 people have received the award, of whom 40 are men and 23 women.

== Award recipients ==
Year	Image	Recipient(s)	Presenter	Ref.
1962	Eddie Cantor in 1945	Eddie Cantor	—N/a	
1963	Not awarded			
1964	Stan Laurel circa 1920	Stan Laurel	—N/a	
1965	Bob Hope in 1978	Bob Hope	Charlton Heston	
1966	Barbara Stanwyck in 1943	Barbara Stanwyck	Ronald Reagan	
1967		William Gargan	—N/a	
1968	James Stewart in 1948	James Stewart	Henry Fonda	
1969	Edward G. Robinson circa 1935	Edward G. Robinson	—N/a	
1970	Gregory Peck in 1948	Gregory Peck	Charlton Heston	
1971	Charlton Heston in The President's Lady (1953)	Charlton Heston	—N/a	
1972	Frank Sinatra in Pal Joey (1957)	Frank Sinatra	—N/a	
1973	Martha Raye in the 1940s	Martha Raye	—N/a	
1974	Walter Pidgeon in the 1940s	Walter Pidgeon	—N/a	
1975	Rosalind Russell in 1956	Rosalind Russell	—N/a	
1976	Pearl Bailey circa 1960	Pearl Bailey	—N/a	
1977	James Cagney in 1942	James Cagney	—N/a	
1978	Edgar Bergen with his ventriloquist dummy Charlie McCarthy	Edgar Bergen	—N/a	
1979	Katherine Hepburn circa 1941	Katharine Hepburn	—N/a	
1980		Leon Ames	—N/a	
1981	Not awarded			
1982	Danny Kaye undated	Danny Kaye	—N/a	
1983	Ralph Bellamy in 1971	Ralph Bellamy	—N/a	
1984		Iggie Wolfington	—N/a	
1985	Paul Newman in 1963	Paul Newman	—N/a	
1985	Joanne Woodward in 1960	Joanne Woodward	—N/a	
1986	Nanette February in 1950	Nanette Fabray	—N/a	
1987	Red Skelton in 1960	Red Skelton	—N/a	
1988	Gene Kelly in 1943	Gene Kelly	—N/a	
1989	Jack Lemmon in 1968	Jack Lemmon	—N/a	
1990	Brock Peters in 1961	Brock Peters	—N/a	
1991	Burt Lancaster in 1947	Burt Lancaster	—N/a	
1992	Audrey Hepburn in 1956	Audrey Hepburn	—N/a	
1993	Ricardo Montalbán in Fantasy Island (1977)	Ricardo Montalbán	Judson Scott	
1994	George Burns in 1961	George Burns	Ann-Margret	
1995	Robert Redford in 1969	Robert Redford	Tom Skerritt	
1996	Angela Lansbury in 1950	Angela Lansbury	Glenn Close	
1997	Elizabeth Taylor in 1956	Elizabeth Taylor	Gregory Peck accepted the award on Taylor's behalf as she was hospitalized and unable to attend the awards ceremony.	
1998	Kirk Douglas circa 1955	Kirk Douglas	Michael Douglas	
1999	Sidney Poitier in 1968	Sidney Poitier	Denzel Washington	
2000	Ossie Davis in 1966	Ossie Davis	Whoopi Goldberg	
2000	Rudy Dee in 1972	Ruby Dee	Whoopi Goldberg	
2001	Ed Asner in 1985	Ed Asner	Tom Selleck	
2002	Clint Eastwood in 2010	Clint Eastwood	Ray Romano and Morgan Freeman	
2003	Karl Malden circa 1950s	Karl Malden	Michael Douglas	
2004	James Garner in 1959	James Garner	Mel Gibson and Julie Andrews	
2005	Shirley Temple in 1949	Shirley Temple	Jamie Lee Curtis	
2006	Julie Andrews in 2013	Julie Andrews	Anne Hathaway	
2007	Charles Durning in 2008	Charles Durning	Burt Reynolds	
2008	James Earl Jones in 2013	James Earl Jones	Forest Whitaker	
2009	Betty White in 2010	Betty White	Sandra Bullock	
2010	Ernest Borgnine in 2004	Ernest Borgnine	Morgan Freeman	
2011	Mary Tyler Moore in 2011	Mary Tyler Moore	Dick Van Dyke	
2012	Dick Van Dyke in 2007	Dick Van Dyke	Alec Baldwin	
2013	Rita Moreno in 2011	Rita Moreno	Morgan Freeman	
2014	Debbie Reynolds in 1987	Debbie Reynolds	Carrie Fisher	
2015	Carol Burnett in 2014	Carol Burnett	Tina Fey and Amy Poehler	
2016	Lily Tomlin in 2014	Lily Tomlin	Dolly Parton	
2017	Morgan Freeman in 2016	Morgan Freeman	Rita Moreno	
2018	Alan Alda in 2014	Alan Alda	Tom Hanks	
2019	Robert De Niro in 2016	Robert De Niro	Leonardo DiCaprio	
2020	Not awarded (due to the COVID-19 pandemic)			
2021	Helen Mirren in 2020	Helen Mirren	Kate Winslet and Cate Blanchett	
2022	Sally Field in 2018	Sally Field	Andrew Garfield	
2023	Barbra Streisand	Barbra Streisand	Jennifer Aniston and Bradley Cooper	
2024	Jane Fonda in 1963	Jane Fonda	Julia Louis-Dreyfus	
2025	Harrison Ford in 2025	Harrison Ford	Woody Harrelson	
2026	Al Pacino - Killing Castro - Q&A - Tribeca 2026 - by @JJxFile-23 (cropped)	Al Pacino		
