= Martin Scorsese and Leonardo DiCaprio =

Collaborations between the director and actor

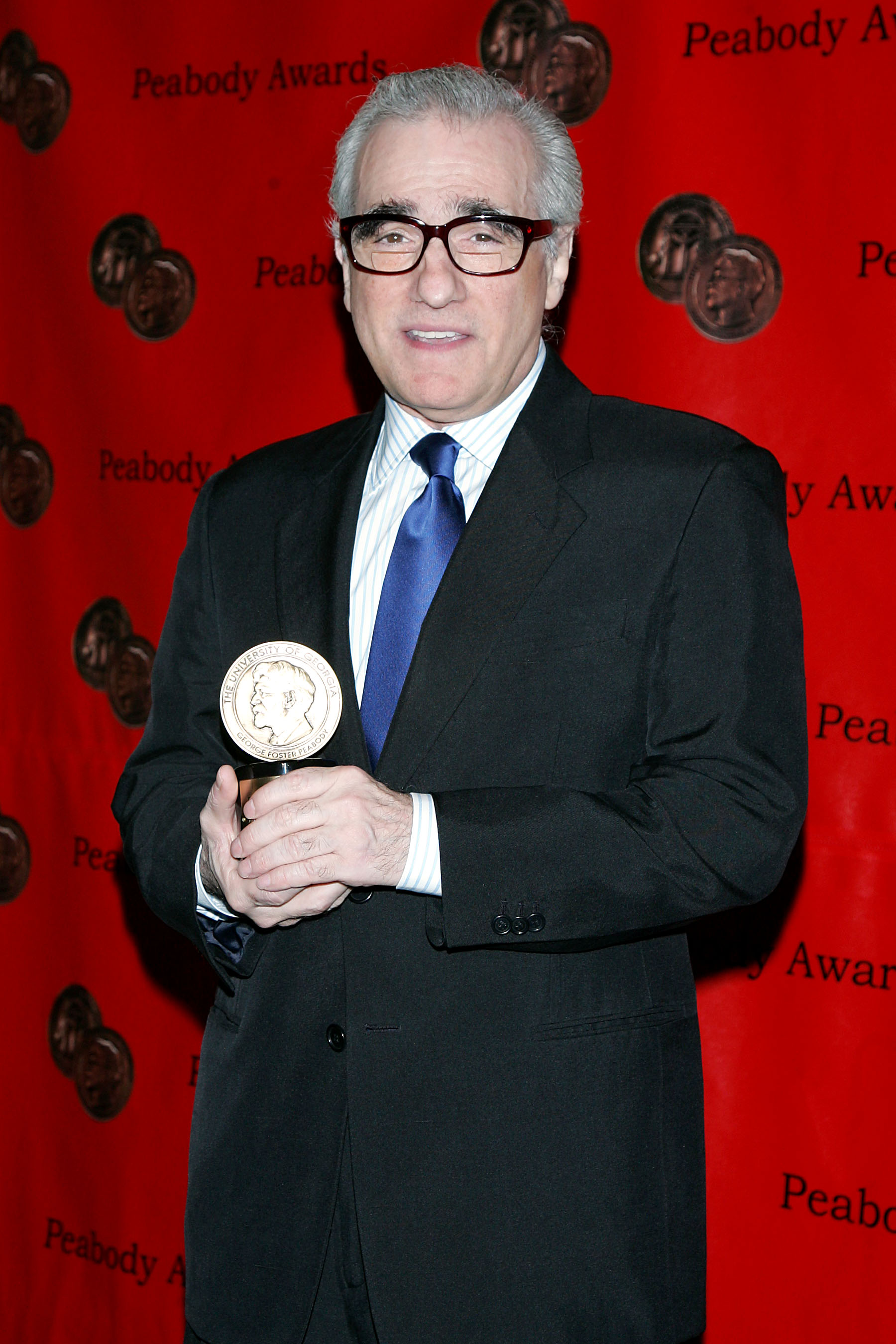
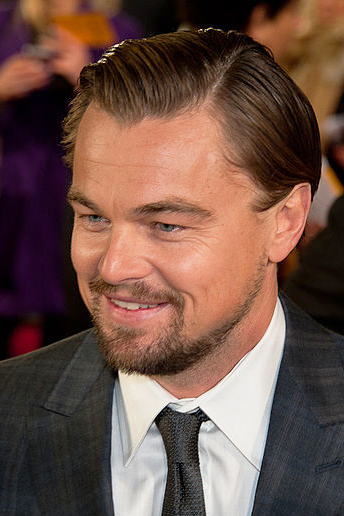
Director Martin Scorsese (left) and actor Leonardo DiCaprio (right)

Martin Scorsese and Leonardo DiCaprio are an American director–actor collaborative duo who have made six feature films and one short film together since 2002. The films explore a variety of genres, including historical epic, crime, thriller, biopic, comedy, and western. Several have been listed on many critics' year-end top ten and best-of-decade and best-of-century lists.

The duo's films have been nominated for thirty-one Academy Awards, winning nine. In 2013, the duo was awarded National Board of Review Spotlight award for career collaboration. Scorsese's work with DiCaprio is considered to be as vital as his work with Robert De Niro.

== Relationship ==
The pair's relationship is one of the most financially successful collaborations in the film industry, bringing a total of $1.3 billion earnings from their five feature films. DiCaprio considered Taxi Driver and Mean Streets his inspirations among Scorsese's previous work. Discussing his collaboration he said, "I am almost about to turn 40, and I am looking back at some of the stuff I've gotten to do, and at the center of it is this amazing accidental collaboration that I've gotten to have with Marty." Scorsese heard about DiCaprio from De Niro, who worked with then 18-year-old DiCaprio in This Boy's Life, and mentioned his work to Scorsese as "impressive." Describing his first collaboration with Scorsese on Gangs of New York, he said, "It was an incredible undertaking."

DiCaprio thanked Scorsese in his acceptance speech at 88th Academy Awards while accepting the Academy Award for Best Actor, saying "I have to thank everyone from the very onset of my career...to Mr. Jones for casting me in my first film to Mr. Scorsese for teaching me so much about the cinematic art form."

== Collaborative filmography ==
Title	Release date	Studio	Budget	Gross	Rotten Tomatoes
Gangs of New York	December 20, 2002	Miramax Films and Touchstone Pictures	$100 million	$193 million	72%
The Aviator	December 25, 2004	Warner Bros. Pictures and Miramax Films	$110 million	$213 million	86%
The Departed	October 6, 2006	Warner Bros. Pictures	$90 million	$289 million	91%
Shutter Island	February 19, 2010	Paramount Pictures	$80 million	$294 million	69%
The Wolf of Wall Street	December 25, 2013	Paramount Pictures	$100 million	$392 million	79%
The Audition	October 27, 2015	Melco Crown Entertainment Limited	$70 million		
Killers of the Flower Moon	October 20, 2023	Apple TV+ / Paramount Pictures	$200 million	$156 million	93%
What Happens at Night	TBA	Apple Original Films			

== Oscars chart ==
Release date	Title	Scorsese	DiCaprio
2002	Gangs of New York	Nominated for Best Director	Not nominated
2004	The Aviator	Nominated for Best Director	Nominated for Best Actor
2006	The Departed	Won Best Director	Not nominated
2010	Shutter Island	Not nominated	Not nominated
2013	The Wolf of Wall Street	Nominated for Best Director; Nominated for Best Picture	Nominated for Best Actor; Nominated for Best Picture
2023	Killers of the Flower Moon	Nominated for Best Director; Nominated for Best Picture	Not nominated

== 2000s ==
=== Gangs of New York ===
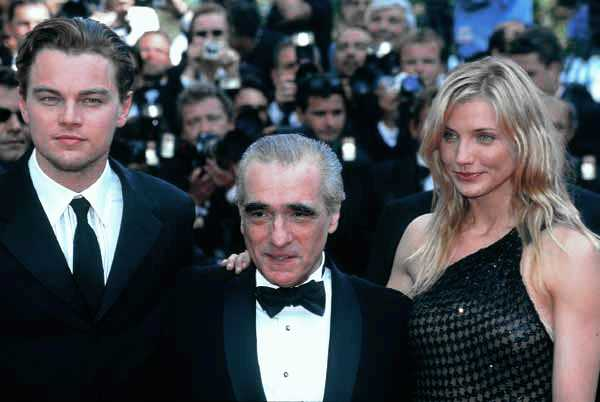
Scorsese and DiCaprio at the Gangs of New York screening at the Cannes Film Festival with Cameron Diaz

In 1999, Scorsese produced a documentary on Italian filmmakers titled Il Mio Viaggio in Italia, also known as My Voyage to Italy. The documentary foreshadowed the director's next project, the epic Gangs of New York (2002), which was influenced by (amongst many others) major Italian directors such as Luchino Visconti and filmed in its entirety at Rome's famous Cinecittà film studios.

With a production budget said to be in excess of $100 million, Gangs of New York was Scorsese's biggest and arguably most mainstream venture to date. The film marked the first collaboration between Scorsese and DiCaprio. Scorsese initially struggled selling his idea of the film until DiCaprio became interested in playing protagonist Amsterdam Vallon, a young leader of the Irish faction. Once DiCaprio was cast, Miramax Films agreed to finance the project. The film received positive reviews and was a box office success, bolstering DiCaprio's reputation as one of Hollywood's preeminent talents. DiCaprio's acting was well-received, although it was somewhat overshadowed by co-star Daniel Day-Lewis' performance.

=== The Aviator ===
After Gangs of New York, the duo worked on the 2004 biopic The Aviator, with DiCaprio starring as aviation pioneer and filmmaker Howard Hughes. The film portrays Hughes' life between the late 1920s and late 1940s, during which time he became a successful film producer and an aviation magnate while simultaneously growing more unstable due to severe obsessive–compulsive disorder (OCD).

The film was a huge commercial and critical success, earning 11 Oscar nominations at the 77th Academy Awards (the most for the ceremony that year). This included Best Picture, Best Director for Scorsese, and Best Actor for DiCaprio, his first in the lead actor category. DiCaprio won the Golden Globe Award for Best Actor for his performance as Howard Hughes.

Roger Ebert of Chicago Sun-Times gave the film four stars out of four and described the film and its subject, Howard Hughes, in these terms: "What a sad man. What brief glory. What an enthralling film...There's a match here between Scorsese and his subject, perhaps because the director's own life journey allows him to see Howard Hughes with insight, sympathy – and, up to a point, with admiration. This is one of the year's best films."

=== The Departed ===
The duo's next collaboration, the 2006 crime drama The Departed, emerged as one of the most successful films in their respective careers. DiCaprio played the role of Billy Costigan, a state trooper working undercover in the Irish Mob in Boston. Highly anticipated after the pair's previous success, the film was released to overwhelmingly positive reviews and became one of the highest-rated wide release films of 2006. Budgeted at US$90 million, it also emerged as DiCaprio and Scorsese's highest-grossing collaboration to date, easily beating The Aviator´s previous record of US$213.7 million.

DiCaprio's performance in The Departed was applauded by critics and earned him a Satellite Award for Best Supporting Actor. The same year, both the Golden Globes and the Screen Actors Guild nominated DiCaprio twice in the Best Actor category (he was also nominated for Blood Diamond), however as Academy Award rules do not allow a person to be nominated twice in the same category, he was nominated only for Blood Diamond. Scorsese won his first Best Director Oscar for The Departed, after six previous losses in the category; the film also took home Best Picture. In 2008, The Departed was nominated for AFI's Top 10 Gangster Films list.

== 2010s ==
=== Shutter Island ===
2010's Shutter Island sees DiCaprio as U.S. Marshal Edward "Teddy" Daniels, who is investigating a psychiatric facility located on an island and comes to question his own sanity. Shutter Island originally received mixed to positive reviews, but was a financial success, and throughout the years became a cult classic.

Roger Ebert of the Chicago Sun-Times gave the film 3½ stars out of 4 and wrote "the movie is about: atmosphere, ominous portents, the erosion of Teddy's confidence and even his identity. It's all done with flawless directorial command. Scorsese has fear to evoke, and he does it with many notes."

=== The Wolf of Wall Street ===
In 2013, DiCaprio reunited with Scorsese for The Wolf of Wall Street. The film was based on the memoir of the same name by Jordan Belfort and recounts Belfort's career as a stockbroker and the rampant corruption and fraud on Wall Street that led to his downfall. The film was listed on many critics' Top Ten lists for both the year and the decade and became Scorsese's highest-grossing film worldwide. The film received five Academy Awards nominations, including Best Picture and Best Director for Scorsese. DiCaprio won a Golden Globe Award For Best Actor - Musical or Comedy for his performance as Belfort and received his third Best Actor Oscar nomination; however, he lost to Matthew McConaughey.

=== The Audition ===
Scorsese and Leonardo collaborated for The Audition, a 2015 short film that served as a promotional piece for casinos Studio City in Macau, China and City of Dreams in Manila, Philippines. The short film united Scorsese and DiCaprio with De Niro, who collaborated with Scorsese for the first time in two decades.

== 2020s ==
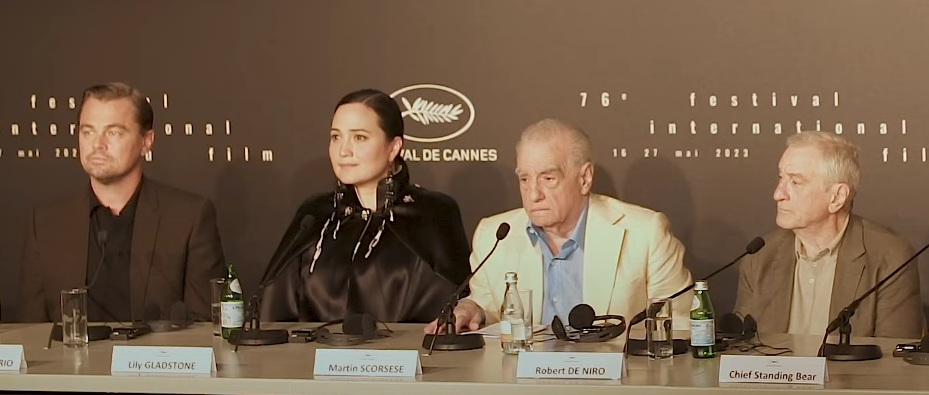
Press conference for Killers of the Flower Moon in 2023

=== Killers of the Flower Moon ===
In October 2018, it was announced that DiCaprio and Scorsese were re-teaming for a film adaptation of David Grann's Killers of the Flower Moon, about the Osage Indian murders. In summer 2019, it was confirmed that Robert De Niro, also known for his work with Scorsese, will star alongside DiCaprio. Shooting was postponed from its original start date due to the COVID-19 pandemic, but ultimately began in April 2021. The film gained universal critical acclaim, ended up in many best of year and best of decade lists, and received ten Academy Awards nominations, including Best Picture, Best Director for Scorsese, and Best Actress for Lily Gladstone. Gladstone won a Golden Globe Award and a Screen Actors Guild award for Best Actress.

In July 2025, the film ranked number 93 on the "Readers' Choice" edition of The New York Times' list of "The 100 Best Movies of the 21st Century."

=== What Happens At Night ===
In 2025, it was reported that DiCaprio and Jennifer Lawrence would star in Scorsese's What Happens at Night, based on the novel of the same name by Peter Cameron. It began production in February 2026.

== See also ==
- List of film director and actor collaborations
- Martin Scorsese and Robert De Niro
