= List of accolades received by The Irishman =

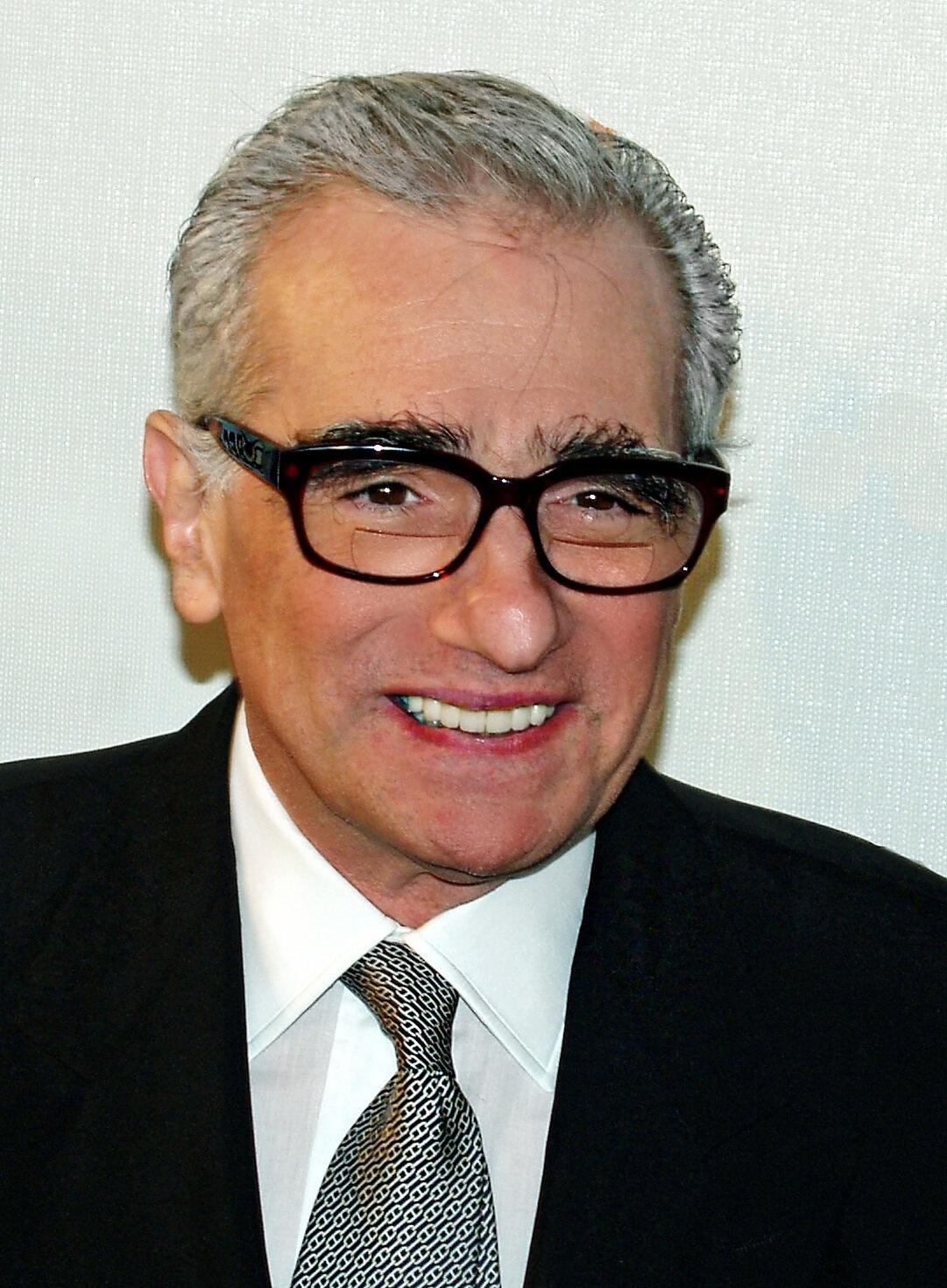
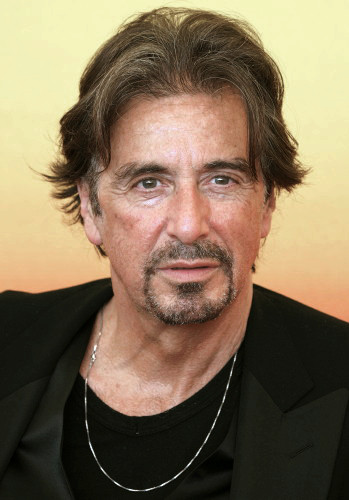
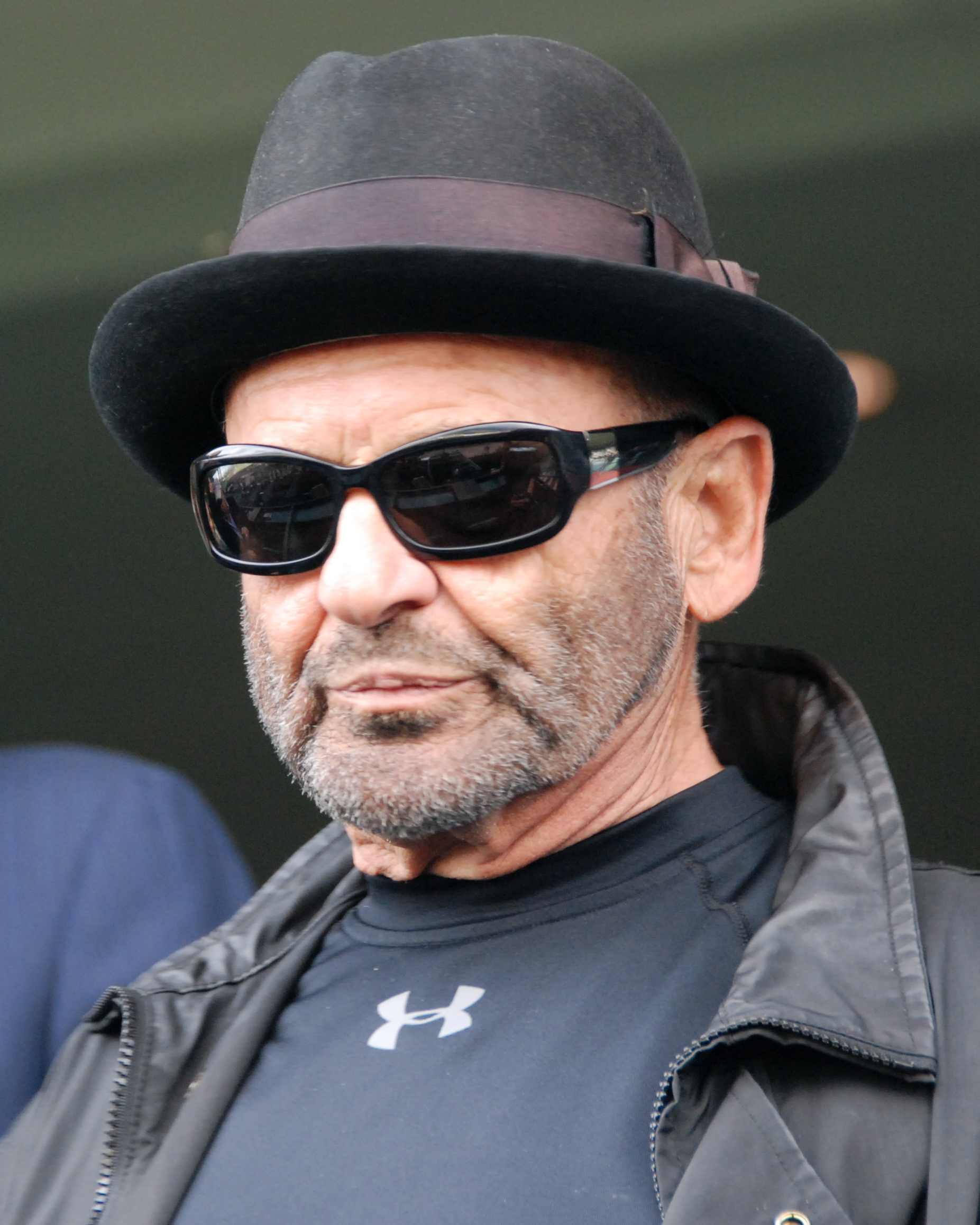
- Martin Scorsese (left) received critical acclaim for his direction, and Al Pacino (middle) and Joe Pesci (right) for their performances
Accolades
Award	Wins	Nominations
AACTA International Awards	0	6
AARP's Movies for Grownups Awards	2	6
Academy Awards	0	10
African-American Film Critics Association Awards	1	1
Alliance of Women Film Journalists Awards	1	7
American Cinema Editors Awards	0	1
American Film Institute Awards	1	1
American Society of Cinematographers Awards	0	1
Art Directors Guild Awards	0	1
Austin Film Critics Association Awards	0	7
British Academy Film Awards	0	10
Boston Society of Film Critics Awards	2	2
Camerimage	0	1
Casting Society of America Awards	0	1
Chicago Film Critics Association Awards	1	8
Chicago International Film Festival	1	1
Cinema Audio Society Awards	0	1
Critics' Choice Movie Awards	1	14
Dallas–Fort Worth Film Critics Association Awards	6	6
Detroit Film Critics Society Awards	2	7
Directors Guild of America Award	0	1
Dorian Awards	0	2
Florida Film Critics Circle Awards	2	4
Georgia Film Critics Association Awards	2	6
Golden Globe Awards	0	5
Golden Reel Awards	0	1
Golden Trailer Awards	1	2
Hollywood Critics Association Awards	1	9
Hollywood Film Awards	3	3
Houston Film Critics Society Awards	0	5
IGN Awards	2	5
IndieWire Critics Poll	8	8
London Film Critics Circle Awards	1	6
Los Angeles Film Critics Association Awards	3	3
Make-Up Artists And Hair Stylists Guild Awards	0	1
National Board of Review Awards	3	3
National Society of Film Critics Awards	2	2
New York Film Critics Circle Awards	2	2
New York Film Critics Online Awards	2	2
Online Film Critics Society Awards	2	8
Producers Guild of America Awards	0	1
San Diego Film Critics Society Awards	4	10
San Francisco Bay Area Film Critics Circle Awards	0	7
Satellite Awards	0	6
Saturn Awards	0	1
Screen Actors Guild Awards	0	4
Seattle Film Critics Society Awards	0	10
St. Louis Film Critics Association Awards	3	9
Toronto Film Critics Association Awards	4	4
USC Scripter Award	0	1
Vancouver Film Critics Circle Awards	0	3
Visual Effects Society Awards	0	1
Washington D.C. Area Film Critics Association Awards	0	9
Writers Guild of America Awards	0	1

Totals (Note: Certain award groups do not simply award one winner. They acknowledge several different recipients, have runners-up, and have third place. Since this is a specific recognition and is different from losing an award, runner-up mentions are considered wins in this award tally. For simplification and to avoid errors, each award in this list has been presumed to have had a prior nomination.)
- Wins: 65
- Nominations: 238

The Irishman (also titled onscreen as I Heard You Paint Houses) is a 2019 American epic crime film directed and produced by Martin Scorsese and written by Steven Zaillian, based on the 2004 book I Heard You Paint Houses by Charles Brandt. It stars Robert De Niro, Al Pacino, and Joe Pesci, with Ray Romano, Bobby Cannavale, Anna Paquin, Stephen Graham, Stephanie Kurtzuba, Jesse Plemons, and Harvey Keitel in supporting roles. The film follows Frank Sheeran (De Niro), a truck driver who becomes a hitman involved with mobster Russell Bufalino (Pesci) and his crime family, including his time working for the powerful Teamster Jimmy Hoffa (Pacino). The film premiered at the 57th New York Film Festival, and had a limited theatrical release on November 1, 2019, followed by digital streaming on Netflix starting on November 27, 2019. Rotten Tomatoes, a review aggregator, surveyed 466 reviews and judged 95% to be positive.

The Irishman received widespread critical acclaim, with particular praise for Scorsese's direction and the performances of De Niro, Pacino, and Pesci. The film received numerous accolades; at the 92nd Academy Awards, it received 10 nominations, including Best Picture, Best Director, Best Supporting Actor for Pacino and Pesci, and Best Adapted Screenplay. Additionally, at the 77th Golden Globe Awards, it was nominated for five awards, including Best Motion Picture – Drama, while it earned 10 nominations at 73rd British Academy Film Awards, including Best Film, but they didn't win any awards. It is Scorsese's second time with ten nominations for a film which did not win any Oscars behind his previous 2002 film, Gangs of New York—a distinction it shares with 2010's True Grit and 2013's American Hustle, after the 11 for 1977's The Turning Point and 1985's The Color Purple.

== Accolades ==
Award	Date of ceremony	Category	Recipient(s)	Result	Ref.
AACTA International Awards	January 3, 2020	Best Film	The Irishman	Nominated	
AACTA International Awards	January 3, 2020	Best Direction	Martin Scorsese	Nominated	
AACTA International Awards	January 3, 2020	Best Screenplay	Steven Zaillian	Nominated	
AACTA International Awards	January 3, 2020	Best Actor	Robert De Niro	Nominated	
AACTA International Awards	January 3, 2020	Best Supporting Actor	Al Pacino	Nominated	
AACTA International Awards	January 3, 2020	Best Supporting Actor	Joe Pesci	Nominated	
AARP's Movies for Grownups Awards	January 11, 2020	Best Picture	The Irishman	Won	
AARP's Movies for Grownups Awards	January 11, 2020	Best Actor	Robert De Niro	Nominated	
AARP's Movies for Grownups Awards	January 11, 2020	Best Supporting Actor	Al Pacino	Nominated	
AARP's Movies for Grownups Awards	January 11, 2020	Best Director	Martin Scorsese	Won	
AARP's Movies for Grownups Awards	January 11, 2020	Best Screenwriter	Steven Zaillian	Nominated	
AARP's Movies for Grownups Awards	January 11, 2020	Reader's Choice	The Irishman	Nominated	
Academy Awards	February 9, 2020	Best Picture	Martin Scorsese, Robert De Niro, Jane Rosenthal, Emma Tillinger Koskoff	Nominated	
Academy Awards	February 9, 2020	Best Director	Martin Scorsese	Nominated	
Academy Awards	February 9, 2020	Best Supporting Actor	Al Pacino	Nominated	
Academy Awards	February 9, 2020	Best Supporting Actor	Joe Pesci	Nominated	
Academy Awards	February 9, 2020	Best Adapted Screenplay	Steven Zaillian	Nominated	
Academy Awards	February 9, 2020	Best Cinematography	Rodrigo Prieto	Nominated	
Academy Awards	February 9, 2020	Best Costume Design	Sandy Powell and Christopher Peterson	Nominated	
Academy Awards	February 9, 2020	Best Film Editing	Thelma Schoonmaker	Nominated	
Academy Awards	February 9, 2020	Best Production Design	Bob Shaw and Regina Graves	Nominated	
Academy Awards	February 9, 2020	Best Visual Effects	Pablo Helman, Leandro Estebecorena, Nelson Sepulveda-Fauser, and Stephane Grabli	Nominated	
African-American Film Critics Association Awards	December 10, 2019	Top Ten Films	The Irishman	5th place	
Alliance of Women Film Journalists Awards	January 10, 2020	Best Picture	The Irishman	Nominated	
Alliance of Women Film Journalists Awards	January 10, 2020	Best Director	Martin Scorsese	Nominated	
Alliance of Women Film Journalists Awards	January 10, 2020	Best Adapted Screenplay	Steven Zaillian	Nominated	
Alliance of Women Film Journalists Awards	January 10, 2020	Best Supporting Actor	Al Pacino	Nominated	
Alliance of Women Film Journalists Awards	January 10, 2020	Best Supporting Actor	Joe Pesci	Nominated	
Alliance of Women Film Journalists Awards	January 10, 2020	Best Ensemble	Ellen Lewis	Nominated	
Alliance of Women Film Journalists Awards	January 10, 2020	Best Editing	Thelma Schoonmaker	Won	
American Cinema Editors Awards	January 17, 2020	Best Edited Feature Film – Dramatic	Thelma Schoonmaker	Nominated	
American Film Institute Awards	January 3, 2020	Top 10 Films of the Year	The Irishman	Won	
American Society of Cinematographers Awards	January 25, 2020	Outstanding Achievement in Cinematography in Theatrical Releases	Rodrigo Prieto	Nominated	
Art Directors Guild Awards	February 1, 2020	Excellence in Production Design for a Period Film	Bob Shaw	Nominated	
Austin Film Critics Association Awards	January 6, 2020	Best Film	The Irishman	Nominated	
Austin Film Critics Association Awards	January 6, 2020	Best Director	Martin Scorsese	Nominated	
Austin Film Critics Association Awards	January 6, 2020	Best Supporting Actor	Al Pacino	Nominated	
Austin Film Critics Association Awards	January 6, 2020	Best Supporting Actor	Joe Pesci	Nominated	
Austin Film Critics Association Awards	January 6, 2020	Best Adapted Screenplay	Steven Zaillian	Nominated	
Austin Film Critics Association Awards	January 6, 2020	Best Ensemble	The Irishman	Nominated	
Austin Film Critics Association Awards	January 6, 2020	Best Editing	Thelma Schoonmaker	Nominated	
Boston Society of Film Critics Awards	December 15, 2019	Best Supporting Actor	Joe Pesci	Runner-up	
Boston Society of Film Critics Awards	December 15, 2019	Best Editing	Thelma Schoonmaker	Won	
British Academy Film Awards	February 2, 2020	Best Film	Robert De Niro, Jane Rosenthal, Martin Scorsese, and Emma Tillinger Koskoff	Nominated	
British Academy Film Awards	February 2, 2020	Best Director	Martin Scorsese	Nominated	
British Academy Film Awards	February 2, 2020	Best Adapted Screenplay	Steven Zaillian	Nominated	
British Academy Film Awards	February 2, 2020	Best Supporting Actor	Al Pacino	Nominated	
British Academy Film Awards	February 2, 2020	Best Supporting Actor	Joe Pesci	Nominated	
British Academy Film Awards	February 2, 2020	Best Cinematography	Rodrigo Prieto	Nominated	
British Academy Film Awards	February 2, 2020	Best Editing	Thelma Schoonmaker	Nominated	
British Academy Film Awards	February 2, 2020	Best Production Design	Bob Shaw and Regina Graves	Nominated	
British Academy Film Awards	February 2, 2020	Best Costume Design	Christopher Peterson and Sandy Powell	Nominated	
British Academy Film Awards	February 2, 2020	Best Special Visual Effects	Leandro Estebecorena, Stephane Grabli, and Pablo Helman	Nominated	
Camerimage	November 16, 2019	Golden Frog	Rodrigo Prieto	Nominated	
Casting Society of America	January 30, 2020	Feature Big Budget – Drama	Ellen Lewis and Kate Sprance	Nominated	
Chicago Film Critics Association Awards	December 14, 2019	Best Film	The Irishman	Nominated	
Chicago Film Critics Association Awards	December 14, 2019	Best Director	Martin Scorsese	Nominated	
Chicago Film Critics Association Awards	December 14, 2019	Best Actor	Robert De Niro	Nominated	
Chicago Film Critics Association Awards	December 14, 2019	Best Supporting Actor	Al Pacino	Nominated	
Chicago Film Critics Association Awards	December 14, 2019	Best Supporting Actor	Joe Pesci	Nominated	
Chicago Film Critics Association Awards	December 14, 2019	Best Adapted Screenplay	Steven Zaillian	Nominated	
Chicago Film Critics Association Awards	December 14, 2019	Best Editing	Thelma Schoonmaker	Won	
Chicago Film Critics Association Awards	December 14, 2019	Best Use of Visual Effects	The Irishman	Nominated	
Chicago International Film Festival	October 25, 2019	Founder's Award	Martin Scorsese	Won	
Cinema Audio Society Awards	January 25, 2020	Outstanding Achievement in Sound Mixing for a Motion Picture – Live Action	Tod Maitland, Tom Fleischman, Eugene Gearty, Mark DeSimone, and George A. Lara	Nominated	
Critics' Choice Movie Awards	January 12, 2020	Best Picture	The Irishman	Nominated	
Critics' Choice Movie Awards	January 12, 2020	Best Actor	Robert De Niro	Nominated	
Critics' Choice Movie Awards	January 12, 2020	Best Supporting Actor	Al Pacino	Nominated	
Critics' Choice Movie Awards	January 12, 2020	Best Supporting Actor	Joe Pesci	Nominated	
Critics' Choice Movie Awards	January 12, 2020	Best Acting Ensemble	The Irishman	Won	
Critics' Choice Movie Awards	January 12, 2020	Best Director	Martin Scorsese	Nominated	
Critics' Choice Movie Awards	January 12, 2020	Best Adapted Screenplay	Steven Zaillian	Nominated	
Critics' Choice Movie Awards	January 12, 2020	Best Cinematography	Rodrigo Prieto	Nominated	
Critics' Choice Movie Awards	January 12, 2020	Best Production Design	Bob Shaw and Regina Graves	Nominated	
Critics' Choice Movie Awards	January 12, 2020	Best Editing	Thelma Schoonmaker	Nominated	
Critics' Choice Movie Awards	January 12, 2020	Best Costume Design	Sandy Powell and Christopher Peterson	Nominated	
Critics' Choice Movie Awards	January 12, 2020	Best Hair and Makeup	The Irishman	Nominated	
Critics' Choice Movie Awards	January 12, 2020	Best Visual Effects	The Irishman	Nominated	
Critics' Choice Movie Awards	January 12, 2020	Best Score	Robbie Robertson	Nominated	
Dallas–Fort Worth Film Critics Association Awards	December 14, 2019	Best Film	The Irishman	4th place	
Dallas–Fort Worth Film Critics Association Awards	December 14, 2019	Best Actor	Robert De Niro	5th place	
Dallas–Fort Worth Film Critics Association Awards	December 14, 2019	Best Supporting Actor	Al Pacino	4th place	
Dallas–Fort Worth Film Critics Association Awards	December 14, 2019	Best Supporting Actor	Joe Pesci	3rd place	
Dallas–Fort Worth Film Critics Association Awards	December 14, 2019	Best Director	Martin Scorsese	3rd place	
Dallas–Fort Worth Film Critics Association Awards	December 14, 2019	Best Screenplay	Steven Zaillian	Runner-up	
Detroit Film Critics Society Awards	December 9, 2019	Best Film	The Irishman	Nominated	
Detroit Film Critics Society Awards	December 9, 2019	Best Director	Martin Scorsese	Won	
Detroit Film Critics Society Awards	December 9, 2019	Best Actor	Robert De Niro	Nominated	
Detroit Film Critics Society Awards	December 9, 2019	Best Supporting Actor	Joe Pesci	Won	
Detroit Film Critics Society Awards	December 9, 2019	Best Supporting Actress	Anna Paquin	Nominated	
Detroit Film Critics Society Awards	December 9, 2019	Best Ensemble	The Irishman	Nominated	
Detroit Film Critics Society Awards	December 9, 2019	Best Screenplay	Steven Zaillian	Nominated	
Directors Guild of America Award	January 25, 2020	Outstanding Directing – Feature Film	Martin Scorsese	Nominated	
Dorian Awards	January 8, 2020	Film Performance of the Year – Supporting Actor	Al Pacino	Nominated	
Dorian Awards	January 8, 2020	Film Performance of the Year – Supporting Actor	Joe Pesci	Nominated	
Florida Film Critics Circle Awards	December 23, 2019	Best Film	The Irishman	Nominated	
Florida Film Critics Circle Awards	December 23, 2019	Best Supporting Actor	Joe Pesci	Won	
Florida Film Critics Circle Awards	December 23, 2019	Best Ensemble	The Irishman	Nominated	
Florida Film Critics Circle Awards	December 23, 2019	Best Adapted Screenplay	Steven Zaillian	Runner-up	
Georgia Film Critics Association Awards	January 10, 2020	Best Picture	The Irishman	Nominated	
Georgia Film Critics Association Awards	January 10, 2020	Best Director	Martin Scorsese	Nominated	
Georgia Film Critics Association Awards	January 10, 2020	Best Supporting Actor	Al Pacino	Nominated	
Georgia Film Critics Association Awards	January 10, 2020	Best Supporting Actor	Joe Pesci	Won	
Georgia Film Critics Association Awards	January 10, 2020	Best Adapted Screenplay	Steven Zaillian	Won	
Georgia Film Critics Association Awards	January 10, 2020	Best Ensemble	The Irishman	Nominated	
Golden Globe Awards	January 5, 2020	Best Motion Picture – Drama	The Irishman	Nominated	
Golden Globe Awards	January 5, 2020	Best Supporting Actor	Al Pacino	Nominated	
Golden Globe Awards	January 5, 2020	Best Supporting Actor	Joe Pesci	Nominated	
Golden Globe Awards	January 5, 2020	Best Director	Martin Scorsese	Nominated	
Golden Globe Awards	January 5, 2020	Best Screenplay	Steven Zaillian	Nominated	
Golden Reel Awards	January 19, 2020	Outstanding Achievement in Sound Editing – Dialogue and ADR	Philip Stockton, Eugene Gearty, and Marissa Littfield	Nominated	
Golden Trailer Awards	May 29, 2019	Best Motion/Title Graphics	"Shell", Netflix, Open Road	Won	
Golden Trailer Awards	May 29, 2019	Best Graphics in a TV Spot (for a Feature Film)	"Shell", Netflix, Open Road	Nominated	
Hollywood Critics Association Awards	January 9, 2020	Best Picture	The Irishman	Nominated	
Hollywood Critics Association Awards	January 9, 2020	Best Male Director	Martin Scorsese	Nominated	
Hollywood Critics Association Awards	January 9, 2020	Best Supporting Actor	Joe Pesci	Won	
Hollywood Critics Association Awards	January 9, 2020	Best Adapted Screenplay	Steven Zaillian	Nominated	
Hollywood Critics Association Awards	January 9, 2020	Best Cast	The Irishman	Nominated	
Hollywood Critics Association Awards	January 9, 2020	Best Animated or VFX Performance	Robert De Niro	Nominated	
Hollywood Critics Association Awards	January 9, 2020	Best Editing	Thelma Schoonmaker	Nominated	
Hollywood Critics Association Awards	January 9, 2020	Best Hair and Makeup	Nicki Ledermann, Sean Flanigan, and Carla White	Nominated	
Hollywood Critics Association Awards	January 9, 2020	Best Visual Effects	Pablo Helman, Leandro Estebecorena, Stephane Grabli, and Nelson Sepulveda-Fauser	Nominated	
Hollywood Film Awards	November 3, 2019	Hollywood Supporting Actor Award	Al Pacino	Won	
Hollywood Film Awards	November 3, 2019	Hollywood Producer Award	Emma Tillinger Koskoff	Won	
Hollywood Film Awards	November 3, 2019	Hollywood Visual Effects Award	Pablo Helman	Won	
Houston Film Critics Society Awards	January 2, 2020	Best Picture	The Irishman	Nominated	
Houston Film Critics Society Awards	January 2, 2020	Best Director	Martin Scorsese	Nominated	
Houston Film Critics Society Awards	January 2, 2020	Best Supporting Actor	Al Pacino	Nominated	
Houston Film Critics Society Awards	January 2, 2020	Best Supporting Actor	Joe Pesci	Nominated	
Houston Film Critics Society Awards	January 2, 2020	Best Cinematography	Rodrigo Prieto	Nominated	
IGN Awards	December 20, 2019	Best Movie of the Year	The Irishman	Nominated	
IGN Awards	December 20, 2019	Best Drama Movie of the Year	The Irishman	Won	
IGN Awards	December 20, 2019	People's Choice Award for Best Drama	The Irishman	Won	
IGN Awards	December 20, 2019	Best Director	Martin Scorsese	Nominated	
IGN Awards	December 20, 2019	Best Supporting Performer	Joe Pesci	Nominated	
IndieWire Critics Poll	December 16, 2019	Best Film	The Irishman	Runner-up	
IndieWire Critics Poll	December 16, 2019	Best Director	Martin Scorsese	Runner-up	
IndieWire Critics Poll	December 16, 2019	Best Screenplay	Steven Zaillian	4th place	
IndieWire Critics Poll	December 16, 2019	Best Actor	Robert De Niro	5th place	
IndieWire Critics Poll	December 16, 2019	Best Supporting Actress	Anna Paquin	14th place	
IndieWire Critics Poll	December 16, 2019	Best Supporting Actor	Al Pacino	3rd place	
IndieWire Critics Poll	December 16, 2019	Best Supporting Actor	Joe Pesci	Won	
IndieWire Critics Poll	December 16, 2019	Best Cinematography	Rodrigo Prieto	6th place	
London Film Critics Circle Awards	January 30, 2020	Film of the Year	The Irishman	Nominated	
London Film Critics Circle Awards	January 30, 2020	Director of the Year	Martin Scorsese	Nominated	
London Film Critics Circle Awards	January 30, 2020	Screenwriter of the Year	Steven Zaillian	Nominated	
London Film Critics Circle Awards	January 30, 2020	Actor of the Year	Robert De Niro	Nominated	
London Film Critics Circle Awards	January 30, 2020	Supporting Actor of the Year	Al Pacino	Nominated	
London Film Critics Circle Awards	January 30, 2020	Supporting Actor of the Year	Joe Pesci	Won	
Los Angeles Film Critics Association Awards	December 8, 2019	Best Film	The Irishman	Runner-up	
Los Angeles Film Critics Association Awards	December 8, 2019	Best Director	Martin Scorsese	Runner-up	
Los Angeles Film Critics Association Awards	December 8, 2019	Best Supporting Actor	Joe Pesci	Runner-up	
Make-Up Artists and Hair Stylists Guild Awards	January 11, 2020	Best Special Make-Up Effects	Mike Marino, Mike Fontaine, and Carla White	Nominated	
National Board of Review Awards	December 3, 2019	Best Film	The Irishman	Won	
National Board of Review Awards	December 3, 2019	Best Adapted Screenplay	Steven Zaillian	Won	
National Board of Review Awards	December 3, 2019	Icon Award	Martin Scorsese, Robert De Niro, and Al Pacino	Won	
National Society of Film Critics Awards	January 4, 2020	Best Director	Martin Scorsese	3rd place	
National Society of Film Critics Awards	January 4, 2020	Best Supporting Actor	Joe Pesci	Runner-up	
New York Film Critics Circle Awards	January 7, 2020	Best Film	The Irishman	Won	
New York Film Critics Circle Awards	January 7, 2020	Best Supporting Actor	Joe Pesci	Won	
New York Film Critics Online Awards	December 7, 2019	Top 10 Films	The Irishman	Won	
New York Film Critics Online Awards	December 7, 2019	Best Supporting Actor	Joe Pesci	Won	
Online Film Critics Society Awards	January 6, 2020	Best Picture	The Irishman	Runner-up	
Online Film Critics Society Awards	January 6, 2020	Best Director	Martin Scorsese	Nominated	
Online Film Critics Society Awards	January 6, 2020	Best Actor	Robert De Niro	Nominated	
Online Film Critics Society Awards	January 6, 2020	Best Supporting Actor	Al Pacino	Nominated	
Online Film Critics Society Awards	January 6, 2020	Best Supporting Actor	Joe Pesci	Nominated	
Online Film Critics Society Awards	January 6, 2020	Best Adapted Screenplay	Steven Zaillian	Won	
Online Film Critics Society Awards	January 6, 2020	Best Editing	Thelma Schoonmaker	Nominated	
Online Film Critics Society Awards	January 6, 2020	Best Cinematography	Rodrigo Prieto	Nominated	
Producers Guild of America Award	January 18, 2020	Best Theatrical Motion Picture	Jane Rosenthal, Robert De Niro, Emma Tillinger Koskoff, and Martin Scorsese	Nominated	
San Diego Film Critics Society Awards	December 9, 2019	Best Film	The Irishman	Won	
San Diego Film Critics Society Awards	December 9, 2019	Best Director	Martin Scorsese	Nominated	
San Diego Film Critics Society Awards	December 9, 2019	Best Supporting Actor	Al Pacino	Nominated	
San Diego Film Critics Society Awards	December 9, 2019	Best Supporting Actor	Joe Pesci	Won	
San Diego Film Critics Society Awards	December 9, 2019	Best Adapted Screenplay	Steven Zaillian	Runner-up	
San Diego Film Critics Society Awards	December 9, 2019	Best Editing	Thelma Schoonmaker	Nominated	
San Diego Film Critics Society Awards	December 9, 2019	Best Cinematography	Rodrigo Prieto	Nominated	
San Diego Film Critics Society Awards	December 9, 2019	Best Production Design	Bob Shaw	Nominated	
San Diego Film Critics Society Awards	December 9, 2019	Best Visual Effects	The Irishman	Nominated	
San Diego Film Critics Society Awards	December 9, 2019	Best Ensemble	The Irishman	Runner-up	
San Francisco Bay Area Film Critics Circle Awards	December 16, 2019	Best Film	The Irishman	Nominated	
San Francisco Bay Area Film Critics Circle Awards	December 16, 2019	Best Director	Martin Scorsese	Nominated	
San Francisco Bay Area Film Critics Circle Awards	December 16, 2019	Best Adapted Screenplay	Steven Zaillian	Nominated	
San Francisco Bay Area Film Critics Circle Awards	December 16, 2019	Best Supporting Actor	Al Pacino	Nominated	
San Francisco Bay Area Film Critics Circle Awards	December 16, 2019	Best Supporting Actor	Joe Pesci	Nominated	
San Francisco Bay Area Film Critics Circle Awards	December 16, 2019	Best Production Design	Bob Shaw and Regina Graves	Nominated	
San Francisco Bay Area Film Critics Circle Awards	December 16, 2019	Best Editing	Thelma Schoonmaker	Nominated	
Satellite Awards	December 19, 2019	Best Supporting Actor	Joe Pesci	Nominated	
Satellite Awards	December 19, 2019	Best Adapted Screenplay	Steven Zaillian	Nominated	
Satellite Awards	December 19, 2019	Best Film Editing	Thelma Schoonmaker	Nominated	
Satellite Awards	December 19, 2019	Best Cinematography	Rodrigo Prieto	Nominated	
Satellite Awards	December 19, 2019	Best Original Score	Robbie Robertson	Nominated	
Satellite Awards	December 19, 2019	Best Visual Effects	Pablo Helman	Nominated	
Saturn Awards	October 26, 2021	Best Thriller Film	The Irishman	Nominated	
Screen Actors Guild Awards	January 19, 2020	Outstanding Performance by a Cast in a Motion Picture	The Irishman	Nominated	
Screen Actors Guild Awards	January 19, 2020	Outstanding Performance by a Male Actor in a Supporting Role	Al Pacino	Nominated	
Screen Actors Guild Awards	January 19, 2020	Outstanding Performance by a Male Actor in a Supporting Role	Joe Pesci	Nominated	
Screen Actors Guild Awards	January 19, 2020	Outstanding Performance by a Stunt Ensemble in a Motion Picture	The Irishman	Nominated	
Seattle Film Critics Society Awards	December 16, 2019	Best Picture	The Irishman	Nominated	
Seattle Film Critics Society Awards	December 16, 2019	Best Director	Martin Scorsese	Nominated	
Seattle Film Critics Society Awards	December 16, 2019	Best Actor	Robert De Niro	Nominated	
Seattle Film Critics Society Awards	December 16, 2019	Best Supporting Actor	Joe Pesci	Nominated	
Seattle Film Critics Society Awards	December 16, 2019	Best Ensemble	The Irishman	Nominated	
Seattle Film Critics Society Awards	December 16, 2019	Best Screenplay	Steven Zaillian	Nominated	
Seattle Film Critics Society Awards	December 16, 2019	Best Film Editing	Thelma Schoonmaker	Nominated	
Seattle Film Critics Society Awards	December 16, 2019	Best Production Design	Bob Shaw and Regina Graves	Nominated	
Seattle Film Critics Society Awards	December 16, 2019	Best Visual Effects	Pablo Helman, Leandro Estebecorena, Stephane Grabli, and Nelson Sepulveda-Fauser	Nominated	
Seattle Film Critics Society Awards	December 16, 2019	Best Villain	Joe Pesci	Nominated	
St. Louis Film Critics Association Awards	December 15, 2019	Best Film	The Irishman	Nominated	
St. Louis Film Critics Association Awards	December 15, 2019	Best Director	Martin Scorsese	Nominated	
St. Louis Film Critics Association Awards	December 15, 2019	Best Supporting Actor	Al Pacino	Nominated	
St. Louis Film Critics Association Awards	December 15, 2019	Best Supporting Actor	Joe Pesci	Runner-up	
St. Louis Film Critics Association Awards	December 15, 2019	Best Adapted Screenplay	Steven Zaillian	Won	
St. Louis Film Critics Association Awards	December 15, 2019	Best Cinematography	Rodrigo Prieto	Nominated	
St. Louis Film Critics Association Awards	December 15, 2019	Best Editing	Thelma Schoonmaker	Runner-up	
St. Louis Film Critics Association Awards	December 15, 2019	Best Production Design	Bob Shaw	Nominated	
St. Louis Film Critics Association Awards	December 15, 2019	Best Visual Effects	Pablo Helman	Nominated	
Toronto Film Critics Association Awards	December 8, 2019	Best Film	The Irishman	Runner-up	
Toronto Film Critics Association Awards	December 8, 2019	Best Supporting Actor	Joe Pesci	Runner-up	
Toronto Film Critics Association Awards	December 8, 2019	Best Director	Martin Scorsese	Runner-up	
Toronto Film Critics Association Awards	December 8, 2019	Best Screenplay	Steven Zaillian	Won	
USC Scripter Award	January 25, 2020	—N/a	The Irishman	Nominated	
Vancouver Film Critics Circle Awards	December 16, 2019	Best Film	The Irishman	Nominated	
Vancouver Film Critics Circle Awards	December 16, 2019	Best Director	Martin Scorsese	Nominated	
Vancouver Film Critics Circle Awards	December 16, 2019	Best Supporting Actor	Joe Pesci	Nominated	
Visual Effects Society Awards	January 29, 2020	Outstanding Supporting Visual Effects in a Photoreal Feature	Pablo Helman, Mitchell Ferm, Jill Brooks, Leandro Estebecorena, Jeff Brink	Won	
Visual Effects Society Awards	January 29, 2020	Outstanding Compositing in a Photoreal Feature	Nelson Sepulveda-Fauser, Vince Papaix, Benjamin O'Brien, Christopher Doerhoff	Won	
Washington D.C. Area Film Critics Association Awards	December 8, 2019	Best Film	The Irishman	Nominated	
Washington D.C. Area Film Critics Association Awards	December 8, 2019	Best Director	Martin Scorsese	Nominated	
Washington D.C. Area Film Critics Association Awards	December 8, 2019	Best Actor	Robert De Niro	Nominated	
Washington D.C. Area Film Critics Association Awards	December 8, 2019	Best Supporting Actor	Al Pacino	Nominated	
Washington D.C. Area Film Critics Association Awards	December 8, 2019	Best Supporting Actor	Joe Pesci	Nominated	
Washington D.C. Area Film Critics Association Awards	December 8, 2019	Best Ensemble	The Irishman	Nominated	
Washington D.C. Area Film Critics Association Awards	December 8, 2019	Best Adapted Screenplay	Steven Zaillian	Nominated	
Washington D.C. Area Film Critics Association Awards	December 8, 2019	Best Cinematography	Rodrigo Prieto	Nominated	
Washington D.C. Area Film Critics Association Awards	December 8, 2019	Best Editing	Thelma Schoonmaker	Nominated	
Writers Guild of America Awards	February 1, 2020	Best Adapted Screenplay	Steven Zaillian	Nominated	

== See also ==
- 2019 in film
