= Martin Scorsese and Robert De Niro =

Collaborations between the director and actor

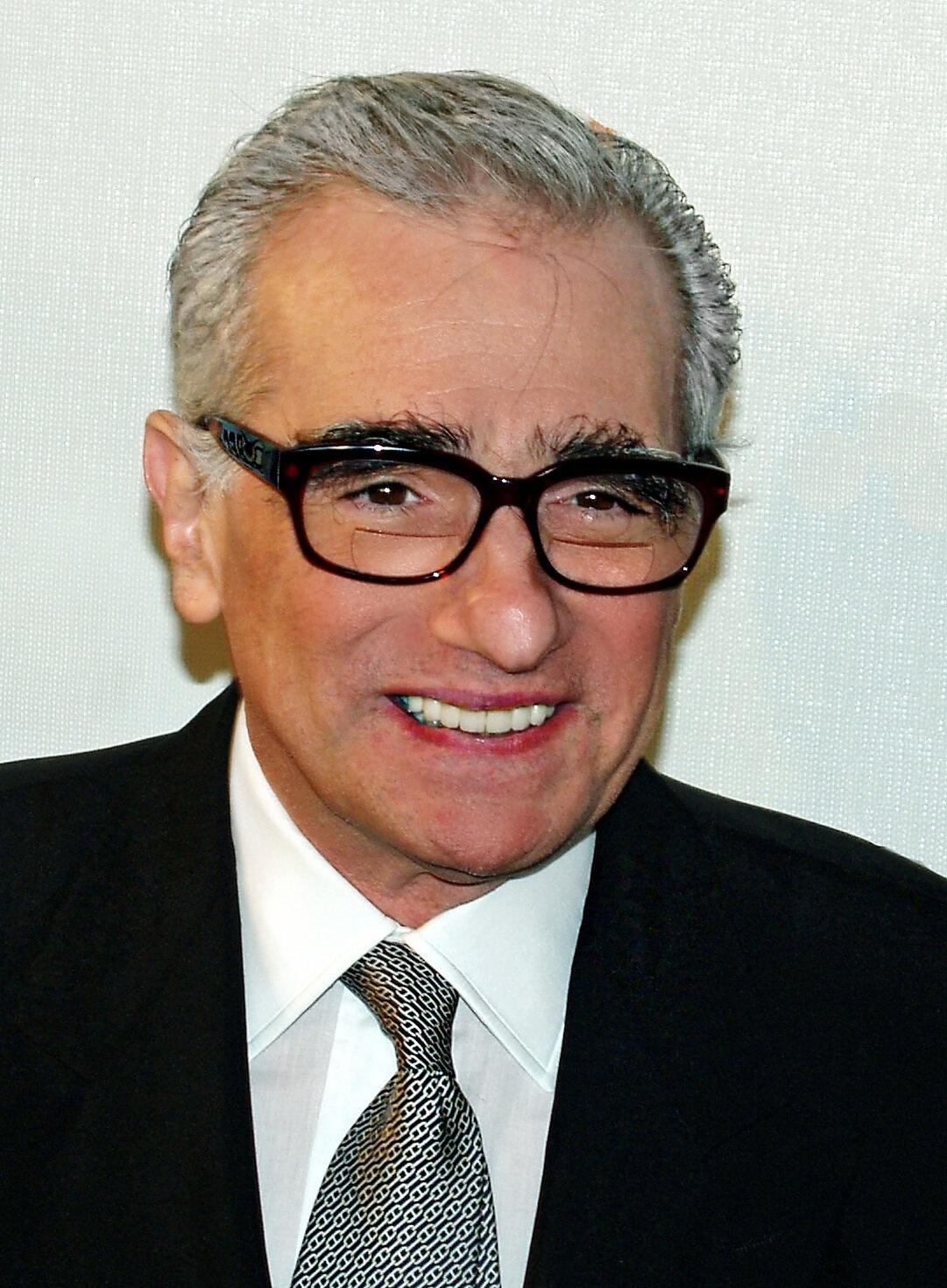
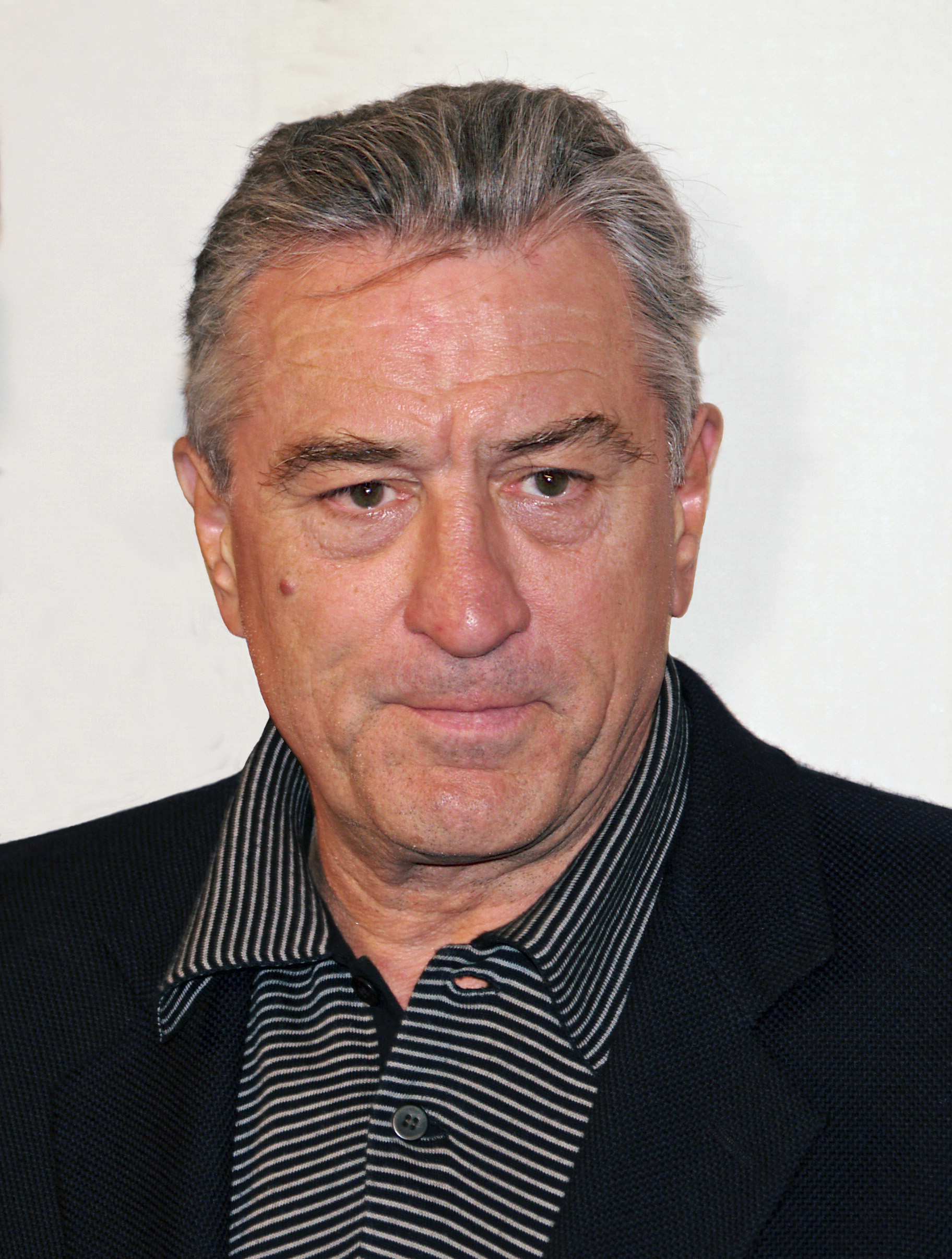
Director Martin Scorsese (left) and actor Robert De Niro

Martin Scorsese and Robert De Niro are an American director–actor collaborative duo who have made ten feature films and one short film together since 1973. Many of them are often ranked among the greatest films of all time.

== Relationship ==
In 1967, Scorsese made his first feature-length film, the black and white I Call First, which was later retitled Who's That Knocking at My Door, with fledgling actor Harvey Keitel. The film was intended to be the first of Scorsese's semi-autobiographical "J. R. trilogy," (Note: J.R. is the main character of Who's That Knocking at My Door.) which also would have included his later film, Mean Streets. Scorsese had impressed many with the film and made friends with Francis Ford Coppola, Brian De Palma, George Lucas, Steven Spielberg, and Robert Zemeckis, known as the influential "New Hollywood" of the 1970s.

It was De Palma who introduced Scorsese to the young actor Robert De Niro. De Niro had known De Palma for several years previously, and his first film role in collaboration with De Palma materialized in 1963 at the age of 20, when he appeared in The Wedding Party. However, the film was not released until 1969. The two reunited for the 1968 film Greetings, which was De Niro's official film debut.

== Collaboration chart ==
Release date	Title	Studio	Budget	Gross	Rotten Tomatoes
1973	Mean Streets	Warner Bros.	$500,000	$3 million	92%
1976	Taxi Driver	Columbia Pictures	$1.9 million	$28.6 million	89%
1977	New York, New York	United Artists	$14 million	$16 million	58%
1980	Raging Bull	United Artists	$18 million	$23.4 million	92%
1983	The King of Comedy	20th Century-Fox	$19 million	$2.5 million	89%
1990	Goodfellas	Warner Bros.	$25 million	$47.1 million	93%
1991	Cape Fear	Universal Pictures	$35 million	$182.3 million	77%
1995	Casino	Universal Pictures	$40 million	$116.1 million	79%
2015	The Audition^{†}	Melco Crown Entertainment	$70 million	N/A	N/A
2019	The Irishman	Netflix	$159–200 million	$8 million	95%
2023	Killers of the Flower Moon	Apple TV+ / Paramount Pictures	$200 million	$156.6 million	93%

† = indicates a short film

== Oscars chart ==
Release date	Title	Scorsese	De Niro
1973	Mean Streets	Not nominated	Not nominated
1976	Taxi Driver	Not nominated	Nominated for Best Actor
1977	New York, New York	Not nominated	Not nominated
1980	Raging Bull	Nominated for Best Director	Won Best Actor
1983	The King of Comedy	Not nominated	Not nominated
1990	Goodfellas	Nominated for Best Director; Nominated for Best Adapted Screenplay	Not nominated
1991	Cape Fear	Not nominated	Nominated for Best Actor
1995	Casino	Not nominated	Not nominated
2019	The Irishman	Nominated for Best Director; Nominated for Best Picture	Nominated for Best Picture
2023	Killers of the Flower Moon	Nominated for Best Director; Nominated for Best Picture	Nominated for Best Supporting Actor

== Films ==
=== Mean Streets (1973) ===
In 1973, De Niro had been praised for his role in Bang the Drum Slowly while Scorsese had been working as an editor on the movie Woodstock. The same year, Scorsese and De Niro collaborated for the first time on the gangster film Mean Streets. Scorsese had been taught that entertaining films can be shot with little money by Roger Corman, who had helped prepare Scorsese for the difficulties of making Mean Streets.

The film, about a small-time gangster living in Little Italy, was a success and in 1997 was selected for preservation in the United States National Film Registry by the Library of Congress as being "culturally, historically, or aesthetically significant". It was also listed in a BBC poll as the 93rd best American film.

=== Taxi Driver (1976) ===
Immensely popular, the film was directed by Scorsese and starred De Niro. It caused controversy, but still had a significant cultural impact. The line "You talkin' to me?", spoken by De Niro's character Travis Bickle, has become one of the most famous lines in film history. Scorsese makes a credited cameo in this film as a passenger of Bickle's who plans to kill his wife.

=== New York, New York (1977) ===
In 1977, De Niro starred in Scorsese's New York, New York, a musical-drama film. It was a musical tribute, featuring new songs by John Kander and Fred Ebb as well as standards, to Scorsese's home town of New York City, and starred De Niro and Liza Minnelli as a pair of musicians and lovers. During filming, the married Scorsese became romantically involved with Minnelli and began heavily using cocaine and narcotics. At the time Andy Warhol wrote in his diary that Minnelli and Scorsese showed up at the door of a famous fashion designer demanding: "Give me every drug you've got".

Made after Taxi Driver, the film was a box-office failure. Its budget was $14 million, a large figure at the time, but it grossed only $13 million at the box-office and its disappointing reception and his breakup with Minnelli drove Scorsese into depression and further into drug abuse.

=== Raging Bull (1980) ===
In 1980, Scorsese made Raging Bull, a film starring De Niro as emotionally self-destructive boxer Jake LaMotta. The film follows LaMotta's journey through life as the violence and temper that leads him to the top in the ring destroys his life outside it. De Niro won an Oscar for his role and Scorsese was nominated as best director; the film received six other Oscar nominations as well.

The film has been considered one of the greatest films of all time, and was chosen as the best sports film ever by the American Film Institute.

=== The King of Comedy (1982) ===
In 1982, Scorsese and De Niro made their first film to feature several comedic elements, while still being connected with the crime genre. The film follows aspiring comic Rupert Pupkin (De Niro), who wants to achieve success in showbiz, by resorting to stalking his idol, a late night talk show host who craves privacy. The film won a BAFTA for Best Original Screenplay, and was nominated for four other BAFTAs, including Best Direction for Scorsese and Best Actor for De Niro.

The film was generally praised by critics but did not perform well in the United States. Scorsese suggested the film "...maybe wasn't so well received because it gave off an aura of something that people didn't want to look at or know."

=== Goodfellas (1990) ===
De Niro and Scorsese collaborated again in 1990 on Goodfellas, which also starred Ray Liotta and Joe Pesci. The film follows Henry Hill (Liotta) as he and his friends work their way up through the mob. Goodfellas was incredibly successful and won five BAFTAs. It was beaten in most categories at the Oscars by Dances with Wolves, but achieved universal acclaim with critics and is considered one of the greatest films of all time.

In 2005, it was named the greatest film of all time by British magazine Total Film.

=== Cape Fear (1991) ===
1991's Cape Fear sees De Niro star as a convicted rapist, released from prison after serving a 14-year sentence, who stalks the family of the defense lawyer who represented him but deliberately suppressed evidence that would have acquitted him. It is a remake of the 1962 film of the same name. The film received generally favorable reviews and was nominated for two Oscars and two BAFTAs. Steven Spielberg was an executive producer.

=== Casino (1995) ===
1995 saw De Niro and Scorsese reunite with Pesci after 1990's Goodfellas for Casino. The film revolved around greed, deception, money, power, and murder that occur between two mobster best friends and a trophy wife over a gambling empire. The film received critical acclaim, with Michael Wilmington of the Chicago Tribune saying "You can't praise highly enough the contributions of the ensemble – De Niro and Pesci especially – but it's Scorsese's triumph." Sharon Stone received an Oscar nomination for her role.

=== The Audition (2015) ===
Scorsese and De Niro collaborated for the first time in two decades for The Audition, a 2015 short film that served as a promotional piece for casinos Studio City in Macau, China and City of Dreams in Manila, Philippines. The short united Scorsese's two muses, De Niro and Leonardo DiCaprio, for the first time on film under his direction.

=== The Irishman (2019) ===
An epic crime film directed by Martin Scorsese and written by Steven Zaillian, based on the book I Heard You Paint Houses by Charles Brandt. The film stars Robert De Niro as Frank Sheeran, a labor union leader and alleged hitman for the Bufalino crime family, Al Pacino as Jimmy Hoffa, and Joe Pesci as Russell Bufalino. The film marks the first time Pacino has been directed by Scorsese.

=== Killers of the Flower Moon (2023) ===
In October 2018, it was announced that DiCaprio and Scorsese were re-teaming for a film adaptation of David Grann's Killers of the Flower Moon, about the Osage Indian murders. In summer 2019, it was confirmed that Robert De Niro will star alongside DiCaprio. Shooting was postponed from its original start date due to the COVID-19 pandemic, but ultimately began in April 2021.

== Other ==
De Niro and Scorsese both lend their voices as supporting characters in the 2004 animated film Shark Tale. De Niro voices Don Lino, a shark and leader of an Italian-style mob. Scorsese voices Sykes, a pufferfish and loan shark, who once worked with Don Lino. As do all the other significant characters in the film, Don Lino and Sykes are animated to somewhat resemble or caricaturize their voice actors.

De Niro and Scorsese also co-star (albeit Scorsese has a relatively minor supporting role) in Irwin Winkler's 1991 film Guilty by Suspicion. Winkler had previously worked as a producer on such Scorsese-De Niro collaborations as New York, New York, Raging Bull and Goodfellas.

In 1993, Scorsese produced (but did not direct) Mad Dog and Glory, a film starring De Niro. In 2013, he executive produced The Family, also starring De Niro. Taken altogether, these films bring the number of films on which both Scorsese and De Niro have worked up to fifteen.

== See also ==
- List of film director and actor collaborations
- Martin Scorsese and Leonardo DiCaprio
