= Uwantme2killhim? =

uwantme2killhim?
- Official film poster
- Directed by: Andrew Douglas
- Written by: Mike Walden
- Based on: "U Want Me 2 Kill Him?"; 2005 Vanity Fair article by Judy Bachrach
- Produced by: Simon Crocker; Steve Golin; Peter Heslop; Bryan Singer; Jason Taylor
- Starring: Jamie Blackley; Toby Regbo; Joanne Froggatt
- Cinematography: Tim Wooster
- Edited by: Michael Elliot
- Music by: Jon Hopkins
- Production companies: Andrew Douglas Company; Anonymous Content; Bad Hat Harry Productions
- Distributed by: Entertainment One
- Release date: 25 June 2013 (EIFF)
- Running time: 92 minutes
- Country: United Kingdom
- Language: English

Uwantme2killhim? (also known as U Want Me 2 Kill Him?) is a 2013 British thriller film directed by Andrew Douglas. The film stars Jamie Blackley and Toby Regbo and premiered at the Edinburgh International Film Festival, where the two actors won the Best Performance in a British Feature Film award. The film is loosely based on a true story and follows two teenage schoolboys who are drawn into a complicated world of online chatrooms, eventually leading to bizarre consequences.

== Plot ==
In 2003, Detective Inspector Sarah Clayton (Joanne Froggatt) tries to establish why British schoolboy Mark (Jamie Blackley) would want to stab John (Toby Regbo). The two were supposed to be friends, yet Mark claims that the crime was necessary. As she looks deeper into the crime and the two teenagers, she discovers that Mark frequented chatrooms and became fascinated with Rachel (Jaime Winstone), a woman he met in one such room. With her prompting, he agrees to make friends with her brother John. Mark quickly begins to fall for her, sympathising with her tales of domestic abuse by her boyfriend Kevin (Mingus Johnston) while believing that they cannot meet because she is in a witness protection program.

Mark is horrified when John informs him that Kevin has killed Rachel, and he begins planning revenge against Kevin. Mark's sanity has been slowly coming apart, culminating in his beginning his plans to stab John after a chat with Janet (Liz White), an MI5 agent, who tells him that John is a person of interest to the agency. It is eventually revealed that John orchestrated the entire plot and that there is no Rachel or Janet, and that he pretended to be various people in order to get to Mark.

== Cast ==
- Jamie Blackley as Mark
- Toby Regbo as John
- Joanne Froggatt as DI Sarah Clayton
- Liz White as Janet
- Jaime Winstone as Rachel
- Mark Womack as Mark's Dad
- Amy Wren as Zoey
- Louise Delamere as Mark's Mum
- James Burrows as Ryan Robins
- Stephanie Leonidas as Kelly
- Mingus Johnston as Kevin

== Reception ==
Critical reception for uwantme2killhim? was mixed to positive. Common praise in the reviews typically centre upon Blackley and Regbo's acting, with the Screen Daily commenting that the two delivered "strong performances". Other reviews questioned the film's need to repeat plot elements and the believability of some of the scenes.

=== Awards ===
- 2013 Edinburgh International Film Festival, Best performance in a British feature film Award
