= Jamie Blackley =

British actor

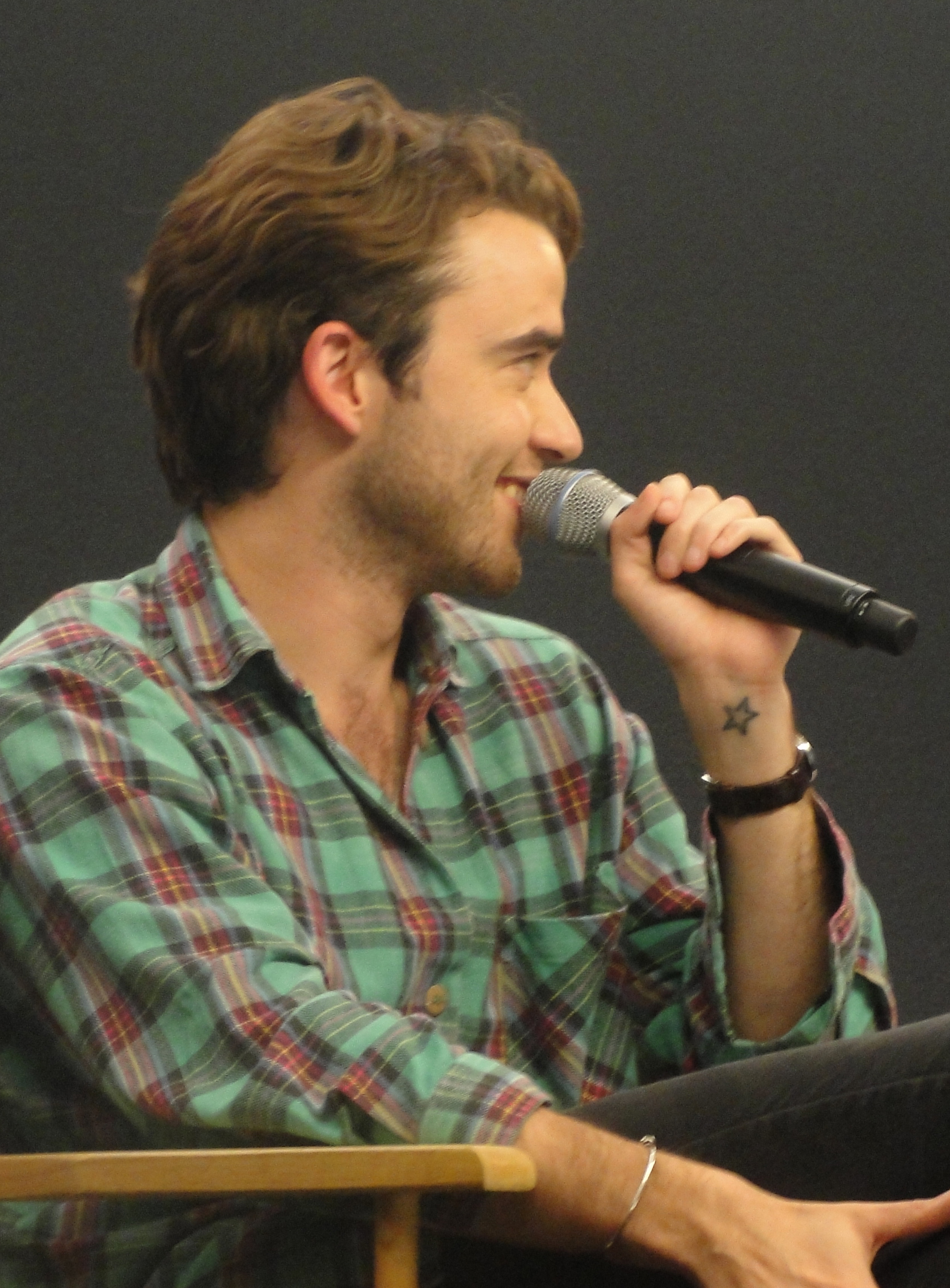
- Blackley in August 2014
- Born: Jamie Alexander Blackley; 8 July 1991 (age 34); Douglas, Isle of Man
- Occupation: Actor
- Years active: 2008–present
- Height: 1.83 m (6 ft 0 in)

Jamie Alexander Blackley (born 8 July 1991) is a Manx-born British actor. He is known for his role as Adam Wilde in the film If I Stay.

== Biography ==
Blackley was born in Douglas, Isle of Man, and was raised in London, England, with his father Martin, mother Marina, and older sister Holly-Anna. His first major appearance was as Hanschen in the London stage production of Spring Awakening. Blackley had a small role as Iain in the fairy tale/action-adventure movie Snow White and the Huntsman (2012), but some of his most prominent film roles include Mark in the thriller Uwantme2killhim? (2013), Sigurdur Thordarson in the thriller The Fifth Estate (2013), and Adam Wilde in the romantic drama If I Stay (2014). He played Freddie Hamilton in The Halcyon.

== Filmography ==
=== Film ===
Year	Film	Role	Notes
2009	London Dreams	Chris	
2010	Prowl	Ray	
2010	London Boulevard	The Footballer	
2012	Checkpoint	Lennox	Short film
2012	Vinyl	Drainpipe	
2012	And While We Were Here	Caleb	
2012	Snow White and the Huntsman	Ian	
2012	Endeavour	John "Johnny" Franks	Pilot episode
2013	Uwantme2killhim?	Mark	
2013	We Are the Freaks	Jack	
2013	The Fifth Estate	Ziggy	
2014	If I Stay	Adam Wilde	
2015	Irrational Man	Roy	
2016	Kids in Love	Tom	
2018	Slaughterhouse Rulez	Caspar de Brunose	
2018	Unexpected Item	Henry	Short film
2019	Greed	Richard McCreadie (young)	

=== Television ===
Year	Title	Role	Notes
2008	Apparitions	Zaid Kopavic	1 episode
2009	Freak	Steve	Web series
2009	Genie in the House	Dylan	
2009	Myths	Steve/Icarus	Six-part series
2009	Casualty	Brodie	1 episode "Price of Life"
2009	Doctors	David Webb	1 episode "Volte Face"
2009	Misfits	Matt	2 episodes
2010	Shelfstackers	Hunter	1 episode "Tranced"
2011	Midsomer Murders	Duncan Hendred	1 episode: "A Sacred Trust"
2012	Endeavour	Johnny Franks	
2013	The Borgias	Raphael	Historical series (1 episode "Lucrezia's Gambit" No.3.7)
2017	The Halcyon	Freddie Hamilton	8 episodes
2019	Traitors	Freddie Symonds	6 episodes
2020	The Last Kingdom	Eardwulf	Season 4
2022	Becoming Elizabeth	Robert Dudley	
2025	Outrageous	Peter Rodd	

=== Theatre ===
Year	Title	Role	Director	Theatre
2009	Spring Awakening	Hanschen	Michael Mayer	Lyric Theatre
2010	Backbeat	George Harrison	Iain Softley	Citizens Theatre

=== Video games ===
Year	Title	Role	Notes
2018	Vampyr	Albert; Lord Hutchinson; Martin; Mortimer; Rookie Timmy; Rufus; Vengeful Ekon (voices)	
2019	GreedFall	Sir De Sardet (voice)	

== Awards ==
Year	Organisation	Film/TV	Award	Result
2013	Edinburgh International Film Festival	Uwantme2killhim?	Best Performance in a British Feature Film (shared with Toby Regbo)	Won
