= The City of Your Final Destination =

- Theatrical release poster
- Directed by: James Ivory
- Screenplay by: Ruth Prawer Jhabvala
- Based on: The City of Your Final Destination by Peter Cameron
- Produced by: Paul Bradley; Pierre Proner
- Starring: Anthony Hopkins; Laura Linney; Charlotte Gainsbourg; Norma Aleandro; Alexandra Maria Lara; Omar Metwally; Hiroyuki Sanada
- Cinematography: Javier Aguirresarobe
- Edited by: John David Allen
- Music by: Jorge Drexler
- Production companies: Hyde Park International; Merchant Ivory Productions
- Distributed by: Screen Media Films
- Release dates: March 21, 2009 (Golden State Film Festival); April 16, 2010 (United States)
- Running time: 118 minutes
- Country: United States
- Language: English
- Budget: $8.3 million
- Box office: $1.4 million

The City of Your Final Destination is a 2009 American romantic drama film directed by James Ivory and starring Anthony Hopkins, Laura Linney, Charlotte Gainsbourg, Omar Metwally, Hiroyuki Sanada and Norma Aleandro. It was written by Ruth Prawer Jhabvala and based on the eponymous novel by Peter Cameron.

The film is the first Merchant Ivory film production without the participation of producer Ismail Merchant and composer Richard Robbins. It is also the last narrative feature film directed by Ivory (as of 2026) and written by Jhabvala to date, the latter which died in 2013.

== Synopsis ==
Graduate student Omar Razaghi (Omar Metwally) wishes to write a biography on obscure writer Jules Gund, who died years before. Omar must travel to Uruguay to persuade the Gund family to authorize the biography.

== Cast ==
- Omar Metwally as Omar Razaghi
- Anthony Hopkins as Adam Gund
  - Nicholas Blandullo as Young Adam
- Alexandra Maria Lara as Deirdre Rothemund (Deirdre MacArthur in the novel)
- Charlotte Gainsbourg as Arden Langdon
- Laura Linney as Caroline Gund
- Norma Aleandro as Mrs. Van Euwen
- Ambar Mallman as Portia Gund
- Norma Argentina as Alma
- Hector Fonseca as Old Gaucho
- Hiroyuki Sanada as Pete
- Julieta Vallina as Schoolbus Lady
- Sofia Viruboff as Adam's Mother
- James Martin as Postman
- Oscar Rolleri as Young Gaucho
- Arturo Goetz as Mrs. Van Euwen's Guest
- Marcos Montes as Mrs. Van Euwen's Guest
- Sophie Tirouflet as Mrs. Van Euwen's Guest
- Luciano Suardi as Doctor Pereira
- Carlos Torres as Barber
- Pietro Gian as Taxi Driver
- Julia Perez as Nurse
- Yuri Vergeichikov as Luis, the Driver
- Agustín Pereyra Lucena as Guitarist
- Pablo Druker as Conductor
- Eliot Mathews as Deirdre's Escort
- Andrew Sanders as Caroline's Escort
- Jonatan Nahuel Ingla as Gaucho
- Nicolás Zalazar as young student
- Susana Salerno as Helpful Person at the Bus Depot
- César Bordón as Helpful Person at the Bus Depot
- Diego Velazquez as Helpful Person at the Bus Depot
- Rossana Gabbiano as Helpful Person at the Bus Depot

The cast had the participation of local actors and citizens who officiated as extras.

== Production ==
=== Setting ===
Most of the story in the novel takes place in a small town in Uruguay. The novel's beginning chapter takes place in Lawrence, Kansas, where the protagonist is a graduate student at the University of Kansas. The story ends at the New York City Opera Hall.

=== Locations ===
Most of the filming took place in two ranches located in the coastal area of the Punta Indio district, Buenos Aires, Argentina. Some scenes were filmed in the district's head city Veronica. Other scenes were filmed on the University of Colorado Campus in Boulder.

== Soundtrack ==
The soundtrack contains the following music:

- "J'ai perdu mon Eurydice" (from "Orphée et Eurydice"), performed by Anthony Roth Costanzo, composer Christoph Willibald Gluck.
- "Venetian Medley", composed and performed by Anthony Hopkins.
- "Dos Palomitas", performed by Charlotte Gainsbourg & Ambar Mallman, traditional popular song from Argentina.
- "The Merry Widow, Second Act: No.7 Introduction. Tanz und Vilja-Lied", performed by Cheryl Studer and Chorus, composer Franz Lehár, Deutsche Grammophon.
- "Sonata for violin and piano (1943), Intermezzo. Tres lent et calme", performed by The Nash Ensemble, composer Francis Poulenc, Hyperion Records.
- "Sambaden", composed and performed by Agustín Pereyra Lucena.
- "Sonatine", performed by Charlotte Gainbourg & Ambar Mallmann, composer G. Turk, Arranged by Cecilia V. Gonzalez.
- "Bastien and Bastienne", Franz Liszt Chamber Orchestra, Raymond Leppard, director, composer Wolfgang Amadeus Mozart, Sony Classical.
- "'El museo de las distancias rotas'" (end title 1), composed for the film and performed by Jorge Drexler, Ediciones SEA/Warner Chappell.
- "'La bruma del ayer'" (end title 2), composed for the film and performed by Jorge Drexler, Ediciones SEA/Warner Chappell.

== Release ==
The film had an early preview in New York City on November 27, 2007 (at the ceremony of the Trophée des Arts for James Ivory from the French Institute New York). In October 2009, James Ivory brought the film to Rome, where it received its official world premiere at the International Rome Film Festival, out of competition, then showing at Tokyo International Film Festival for Hiroyuki Sanada's special screening. Screen Media distributed it in the United States on April 16, 2010.

== Reception ==
=== Critical reception ===
The film holds an approval rating of 39% on Rotten Tomatoes, based on 56 reviews, and an average rating of 5.3/10. The website's critical consensus reads: "A stellar cast can't elevate this leaden adaptation that, while just as beautiful as anything director James Ivory's made before, comes off as dusty and dry". On Metacritic, the film has a weighted average score of 52 out of 100, based on 19 critics, indicating "mixed or average reviews".

== Controversy ==
In early 2007, Anthony Hopkins claimed that he had yet to be paid for his work on the film and that Merchant Ivory had short-changed the cast and crew. Merchant Ivory counter-argued that Hopkins' payment terms had, in fact, recently been renegotiated higher. Later in the year, the actor filed court papers to take the company to an arbitrator. In October 2007, Hopkins filed a lawsuit against Merchant Ivory for payment of his salary of $750,000.

In 2008, actress and singer Susan (Suzy) Malick also filed suit against Merchant Ivory and James Ivory for producer credit and $500,000 in an unpaid loan, used when the film was threatened to be shut down due to lack of funding. In 2012, Malick moved for trial by jury, and the suit was settled out of court.
