= Toby Regbo =

English actor

- Regbo in 2026
- Born: Toby Finn Regbo; 18 October 1991 (age 34); Hammersmith, London, England
- Occupation: Actor
- Years active: 2006–present

Toby Finn Regbo (born 18 October 1991) is an English actor who has appeared in film, television and theatre. He is known for his role as young Nemo Nobody in the science fiction drama Mr. Nobody (2009), as Francis II of France in Reign (2013–2017), Æthelred in The Last Kingdom (2017–2020), Tommaso Peruzzi in Medici: Masters of Florence (2019) and Jack Blackfriars on A Discovery of Witches (2022) and he starred in Platform 7 (2023).

== Early life ==
Toby Regbo was born in Hammersmith, London, England. His father's family is of Norwegian origin. His maternal grandfather was an Italian cruise ship captain, and his maternal grandmother was an Australian ballerina; his mother was brought up in London.

He attended Latymer Upper School in West London. His interest in acting started with plays at school; later on, he attended Young Blood Theatre Company.

== Career ==
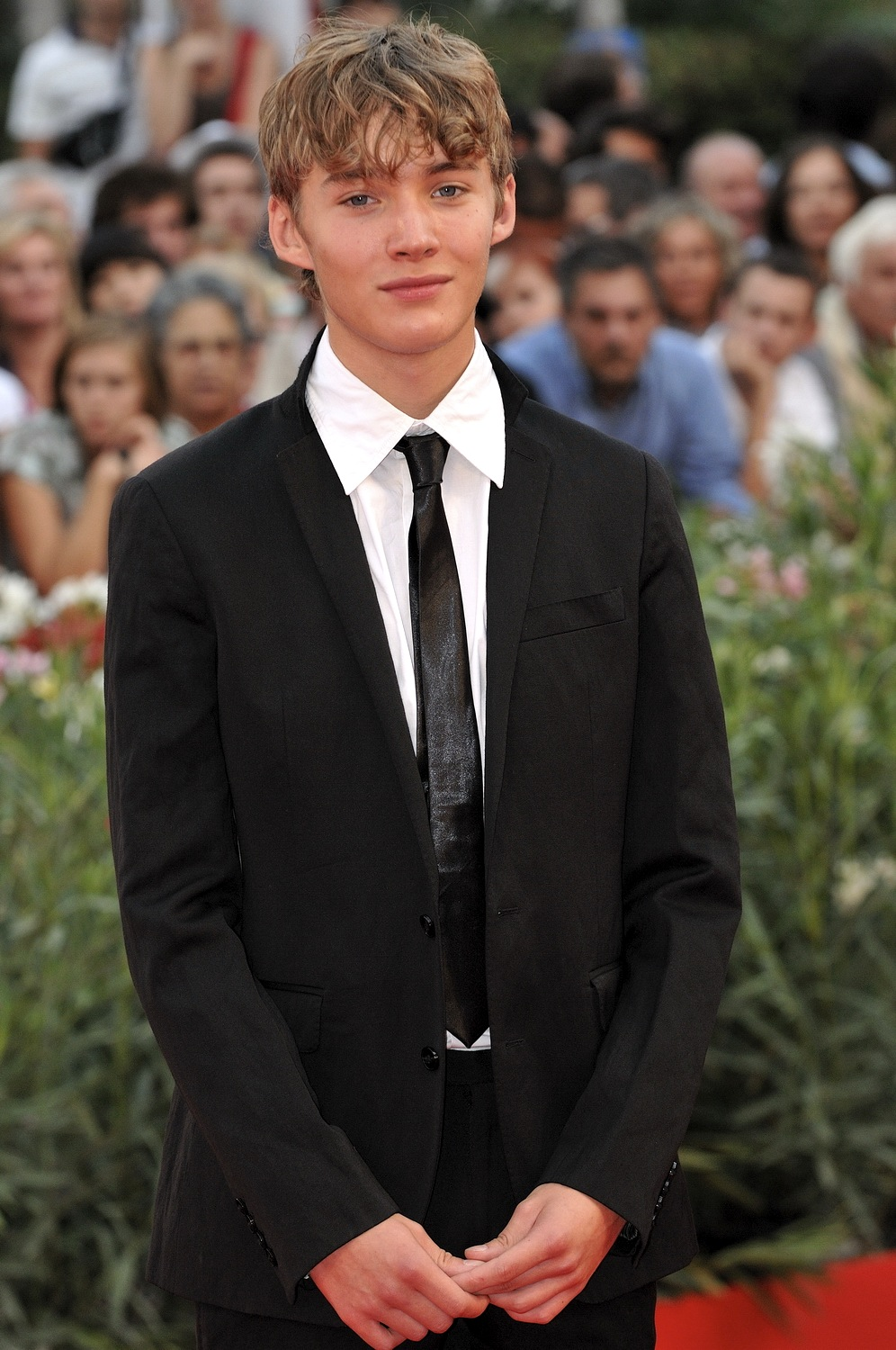
Regbo at the premiere of Mr. Nobody at the 2009 Venice Film Festival

Regbo started his acting career with a small role in 2006 ITV television film Sharpe's Challenge. In 2007, he played American teen spy Chad Turner in an episode of CBBC children's spy-fi adventure series M.I. High. He continued to pursue his acting career in 2009, when he played Michael Walton in Stephen Poliakoff's period drama Glorious 39. One of his most notable roles was in a science fiction drama Mr. Nobody, premiered in 2009. He played eponymous character Nemo Nobody (in his teenage years). He also played young Albus Dumbledore in the film Harry Potter and the Deathly Hallows – Part 1 and reprised the role in the 2018 film Fantastic Beasts: The Crimes of Grindelwald. He made his stage début as Eliot in Tusk Tusk, a 2009 play by Polly Stenham, at the Royal Court Theatre in London.

Regbo played James Sveck in the film version of Peter Cameron's novel Someday This Pain Will Be Useful To You, shot in the summer 2010 in New York. In 2013, Regbo played John in drama-thriller film uwantme2killhim? directed by Andrew Douglas and produced by Bryan Singer. He was originally cast in Disney's Maleficent as young Stefan, but was ultimately replaced by Michael Higgins as the directors decided they wanted a younger boy to play the part. He starred in The CW's original show Reign as Francis II of France. In 2016, he played Æthelred on BBC Two UK's series The Last Kingdom.

Regbo was set to be part of the cast of the planned Game of Thrones prequel titled "Bloodmoon" but the pilot did not get picked up.

In 2023, he played a main role in the ITV1 psychological thriller Platform 7, alongside actors Phil Davis and Jasmine Jobson.

== Critical reception ==
=== Mr. Nobody ===
Film critic Eric Lavallée listed Regbo as one of his "Top 10 New Faces & Voices" of 2009 Toronto International Film Festival. He noted that "newbie Toby Regbo might easily be Mr. Nobody's most 'alive' character. Playing Nemo at age 16, the actor is mostly paired with Juno Temple - their unique love story is the film's heart pumping portions and plays a lot better than the artery clogging other brushes of romance." Variety's Boyd van Hoeij praised Regbo and Temple as well, saying "Regbo, as the teenage Nemo, and Juno Temple, as the teenage Anna, are impressive, bringing the hormonal battles of adolescence vividly to life".

=== Tusk Tusk ===
His portrayal of Eliot in Tusk Tusk received praise from a broad spectrum of theatre critics. Michael Billington from The Guardian called him an "astonishing actor". Robert Tanitch from Morning Star praised both his and co-star Bel Powley's "impressive performances" and predicted that "Tusk Tusk should, all things being equal, play to full houses because of them". Matt Wolf, writing for The New York Times, was also very complimentary about the pair, concluding: "... these newfound talents inhabit every mercurial point on a spectrum that makes them one another's protectors and their destroyers, enemies and allies. Will you be more shaken by Ms. Powley ..., or Mr. Regbo, whose face is chillingly capable of shutting down? It's difficult to say, though one thing is clear: Tusk Tusk is beyond tears in a production beyond praise."

=== Uwantme2killhim? (Also known as U Want Me 2 Kill Him?) ===
Critical reception for uwantme2killhim? produced by Bryan Singer, typically centered upon Regbo and his co-star Jamie Blackley's acting, with the Screen Daily commenting that the two delivered "strong performances". Variety praised his performance commenting "The impressive Regbo is on surer footing as a meek geek with some surreptitious social skills". Maitland McDonagh, from Film Journal International, also complimented the duo noting "Stars Blackley and Regbo are the film's core strength, despite long scenes in which they speak aloud what they're typing into their computers that would tax the skills of many older and more experienced actors".

The film premiered at the Edinburgh International Film Festival, where the two actors won the "Best performance in a British feature film" award.

== Filmography ==
=== Film ===
Year	Title	Role	Notes
2009	Mr. Nobody	15-year-old Nemo	
2009	Glorious 39	Michael Walton	
2010	Harry Potter and the Deathly Hallows	Young Albus Dumbledore	
2011	One Day	Samuel Cope	
2011	Someday This Pain Will Be Useful to You	James Sveck	
2013	uwantme2killhim?	John	
2013	Heart of Nowhere	Luke	Short film
2018	Fantastic Beasts: The Crimes of Grindelwald	Young Albus Dumbledore	
2022	Pinball: The Man Who Saved the Game	James Hamilton	

=== Television ===
Year	Title	Role	Notes
2006	Sharpe's Challenge	Ensign	Television film
2007	M.I. High	Chad Turner	Episode: "Super Blane"
2011	Treasure Island	Jim Hawkins	Miniseries
2012	The Town	Harry	Three-part series
2013–2015; 2017	Reign	King Francis II of France	Main role (seasons 1–3); guest role (season 4)
2017–2020	The Last Kingdom	Æthelred, Lord of the Mercians	15 episodes
2019	Medici: Masters of Florence	Tommaso Peruzzi	7 episodes
2022	A Discovery of Witches	Jack Blackfriars	7 episodes
2022	Chivalry	Christian	3 episodes
2023	Platform 7	Matt	All 4 episodes
2024	Belgravia: The Next Chapter	Rev. James Trenchard	All 8 episodes
2025	Outrageous	Tom Mitford	6 episodes
2026	A Woman of Substance	Jim Fairley	8 episodes
2027	The Cadburys	Richard	

=== Theatre ===
Year	Title	Role	Venue
2009	Tusk Tusk	Eliot	Royal Court Theatre, London

=== Video games ===
Year	Title	Role	Notes
2021	Final Fantasy XIV: Endwalker	Hythlodaeus	Video game
2022	The Diofield Chronicle	Andrias Rhondarson	Video game

== Awards and nominations ==
Year	Award	Category	Work	Result
2013	Edinburgh International Film Festival	Best Performance in a British Feature Film	uwantme2killhim?	Won
2014	Teen Choice Awards	Choice TV Breakout Performance – Male	Reign	Nominated
