= The Audition (2015 film) =

2015 American comedy short film by Martin Scorsese

- Directed by: Martin Scorsese
- Written by: Terence Winter
- Produced by: Brett Ratner; Emma Tillinger Koskoff; Jules Daly
- Starring: Robert De Niro; Leonardo DiCaprio; Brad Pitt; Martin Scorsese
- Cinematography: Rodrigo Prieto
- Edited by: Kevin Tent
- Production companies: Melco Crown Entertainment; RatPac Entertainment; RSA Films; Sikelia Productions
- Release dates: October 3, 2015 (Busan); October 27, 2015 (China)
- Running time: 16 minutes
- Countries: Macau; United States
- Language: English
- Budget: $70 million

The Audition is a 2015 comedy short film directed by Martin Scorsese and written by Terence Winter. It stars Robert De Niro and Leonardo DiCaprio, playing fictionalized versions of themselves, who travel through Asia and compete against each other for a potential role in Scorsese's next film. Brad Pitt, also playing a fictionalized version of himself, makes a cameo appearance.

The short was created to promote Studio City, a hotel casino resort located in Macau. It is Scorsese's first film to feature both De Niro and DiCaprio. Both actors had individually collaborated with Scorsese several times in the past, and had appeared in the same films with one another, but the three had never worked on the same project together. They would eventually work together once again for the 2023 feature film Killers of the Flower Moon.

== Plot ==
Actors Robert De Niro and Leonardo DiCaprio meet with director Martin Scorsese at the City of Dreams Resort in Manila. Both actors are auditioning for Scorsese's newest film, about a ruthless businessman that runs an international casino chain. Despite their long histories of working with Scorsese, De Niro and DiCaprio learn they are competing against one another for the same role.

Scorsese explains the potential role to his two longtime collaborators as they continue to Studio City in Macau. As De Niro and DiCaprio listen, both exhaust Scorsese with their personal cases as to why they are right for the part. While the three have dinner in the hotel, Scorsese becomes inspired when he sees a billboard featuring actor Brad Pitt.

The three then make their way towards Japan. Scorsese suddenly announces that he can make the film without the character, calling him "superfluous to the entire narrative of the film". He says the two actors are no longer needed and quickly parts ways with them.

While De Niro and DiCaprio wonder the director's sudden change of heart, they catch Scorsese meeting with Pitt, who had arrived in Japan on short notice. De Niro and DiCaprio realize that Pitt was chosen for the role, and the two walk off in disappointment. As Pitt sits down with Scorsese, the actor delivers a few line readings, but the director looks unimpressed.

With the audition over, De Niro and DiCaprio end their brief rivalry and decide to enjoy their evening in Japan with one another.

== Cast ==
- Robert De Niro as himself
- Leonardo DiCaprio as himself
- Brad Pitt as himself / Aaron Cross
- Martin Scorsese as himself
- Rodrigo Prieto as himself

== Production ==
The Audition was financed by the Melco Crown Entertainment Limited to commission the opening of Studio City, the company's third casino in the southern Chinese territory of Macau. As advertisements for casinos are banned in mainland China, speculation arose that Melco used the short to exploit a loophole to promote the casino. With the short film's budget around $70 million, each actor was reportedly paid $13 million for less than two days' work.

The script was written by Terence Winter, with whom director Martin Scorsese had previously collaborated on The Wolf of Wall Street and Boardwalk Empire. Scorsese described the writing process for a short as being "tougher in a way" than for a feature film, as a short had to be self-contained rather than preluding to a larger work. He also said his aim for the script was to create a heightened sense of reality-based humor based on the actors in the film. Shooting lasted for less than one week and was done in New York City. The casino was not built during the short film's production, resulting in 3D renderings needing to be done in order to recreate the location during filming.

Scorsese and actors Robert De Niro and Leonardo DiCaprio relished the opportunity to collaborate on the project. The director acknowledged the strong bond between the three of them, as he first learned of DiCaprio through De Niro. DiCaprio called De Niro and Scorsese his "two fathers in the world of cinema" and described the years of collaboration between the director and his counterpart as "the greatest relationship in cinema history". Both actors had individually worked with Scorsese several times; De Niro had worked with the director on eight films when the short was released, DiCaprio had worked with Scorsese on five. Meanwhile, De Niro and DiCaprio had previously appeared together in two films – This Boy's Life and Marvin's Room – the former being DiCaprio's first theatrically-released film. However, the three had never collaborated on a project together. They would eventually collaborate on a feature film eight years later, Killers of the Flower Moon.

De Niro and DiCaprio found the short film's premise humorous due to their long histories of working with Scorsese. DiCaprio also praised Martin Scorsese's acting, claiming the director "stole the show".

== Release ==
On October 27, 2015, The Audition made its official world premiere at Studio City in Macau, China in conjunction with the resort's grand opening. Scorsese, De Niro, DiCaprio and producer Brett Ratner were each in attendance for the premiere.

A prior screening had taken place earlier that month at the 20th Busan International Film Festival in South Korea on October 3, 2015. The short was also supposed to screen at the Venice Film Festival on September 7, 2015, but was reportedly cancelled due to technical problems. Rumors also floated that the reason behind the cancellation was due to some perceiving the film as a promotional piece rather than one of artistic merit.

The Audition has never had a commercial release to date. However, it was placed before feature film screenings in cinemas across Hong Kong and China, presumably to further promote Studio City.

=== Critical reception ===
Elizabeth Kerr of The Hollywood Reporter called The Audition a "keenly self-aware pop culture nugget" that blurred the line between art and advertising. She noted that the short's contents thrived off this tension, saying "The Audition works on the strength of its (surprise!) strong cast and an awareness that they're all shilling for a casino chain. But Scorsese and his A-list cast pull it off with aplomb, having a good time at their own expense".

== See also ==
- Martin Scorsese and Robert De Niro
- Martin Scorsese and Leonardo DiCaprio
