= Someday This Pain Will Be Useful to You =

2007 book by Peter Cameron

- Author: Peter Cameron
- Language: English
- Publisher: Frances Foster Books
- Publication date: 2007
- Publication place: United States
- Media type: Print
- Pages: 229
- ISBN: 0-374-30989-2

Someday This Pain Will Be Useful to You is a young adult novel by Peter Cameron. James Sveck, the protagonist, tells the reader about his life, including the reasons he became a "Missing Misfit" and is seeing a psychiatrist.

== Plot ==
In 2003, James Sveck has recently graduated from high school in New York City and is expected to begin college at Brown University. However, James dreams about skipping college and buying a home in the Midwest, much to his parents' ire. James' anti-social behavior, as well as an "incident" a few months ago, worries his parents and they send him to a therapist. He also works at an art gallery owned by his mother.

Over the course of many sessions with his therapist Dr. Rowena Adler, James reveals that he finds communication with others difficult and unnecessary, and the only people he truly feels comfortable talking to are his grandmother and his supervisor at the gallery, John Webster. He explains that the "incident" was a panic attack he had while on a field trip to Washington, D.C. with his peers; he felt isolated and snuck away to an art museum, whereupon he viewed the paintings The Voyage of Life and realized his immense discomfort of his current life.

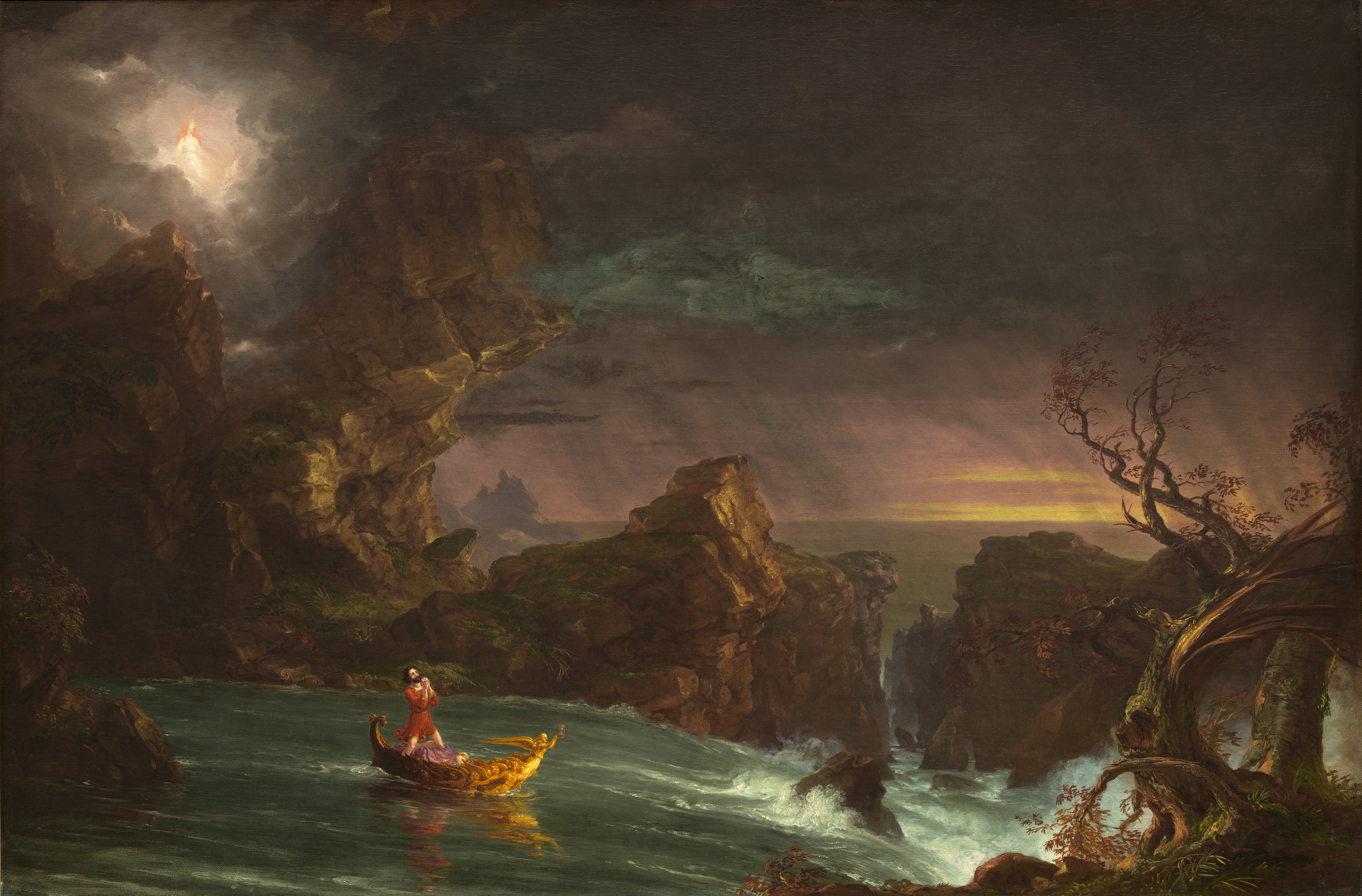
The painting Manhood, from a collection of paintings by Thomas Cole, spurs the protagonist's breakdown.

Meanwhile, James creates a fake dating profile and matches with John. John angrily rebukes James for tricking him. James says in his narration that he knows he is gay, although he has never had a romantic experience with another person and finds it hard to imagine that he ever would. Later, James calls a real estate agency to ask about homes in the Midwest and is disappointed by their quality.

In another therapy session, Dr. Adler asks about his experience of 9/11 as he was near the attacks when they occurred. James reacts dismissively.

James meets his grandmother for advice. She says that it is his choice to go to college, and that if he does go to college and hates it, it will not be a waste because discomfort is useful. She also says that she is leaving all her items in her will to James, and that he should keep what he wants and throw away the rest.

James' mother and sister push him to accept his invitation to Brown. James staunchly refuses at first, but sees that they are desperate and accepts.

A month into college, his grandmother dies from a stroke. James decides to keep all her old items, even though his parents advise him otherwise. He reasons that he is only 18, and he doesn't know what he wants from life and what he needs.

== Characters ==
- James Sveck - 18 years old; lives with his mother; emotionally close to his grandmother
- Gillian Sveck - James's older sister; going into her fourth year at Barnard College; dating Rainer Maria Schultz
- Paul Sveck - James father; questions James about his sexuality
- Marjorie Dunfour - James' mother; owns gallery and is divorced from Paul Sveck (169)
- Rainer Maria Schultz - language theory professor at Barnard College
- Barry Rogers - the man whom James's mother marries but she returns from the honeymoon in Las Vegas without him after he steals her credit card to use for gambling
- John Webster - works for James's mother at the art gallery (10); grew up in Georgia; went to Harvard (23)
- Dr. Rowena Adler - James' psychiatrist (65)
- Miro - the family dog; black standard poodle; James feels the family talks more often to the dog than each other (15)

== Reception ==
=== Awards and recognition ===
- American Library Association (ALA) Best Books for Young Adults 2008
- Amazon.com Top 10 Editor's Picks
- Starred reviews in Booklist, Hornbook, and Kirkus Reviews
- Ferro-Grumley Award for Gay Male Fiction 2008

== Film ==
In 2012, Jean Vigo Italia and Four of a Kind Productions released a film based on the book, directed by Roberto Faenza and starring Toby Regbo. Marcia Gay Harden stars as James' mother, Peter Gallagher plays his father and Ellen Burstyn plays his grandmother.

== Title ==
The title alludes to a line from the Amores by the Roman poet Ovid, "Perfer et obdura, dolor hic tibi proderit olim. (Be patient and tough; someday this pain will be useful to you.)"
