= Someday This Pain Will Be Useful to You (film) =

- Directed by: Roberto Faenza
- Written by: Roberto Faenza; Dahlia Heyman
- Based on: Someday This Pain Will Be Useful to You by Peter Cameron
- Produced by: Elda Ferri; Milena Canonero; Ron Stein
- Starring: Toby Regbo; Marcia Gay Harden; Lucy Liu; Ellen Burstyn; Siobhan Fallon Hogan; Peter Gallagher; Deborah Ann Woll; Aubrey Plaza
- Cinematography: Maurizio Calvesi
- Edited by: Massimo Fiocchi
- Music by: Andrea Guerra
- Production companies: Jean Vigo Italia; Four of a Kind Productions
- Distributed by: 01 Distribution
- Release date: November 18, 2011
- Running time: 95 minutes
- Countries: Italy; United States
- Language: English
- Budget: $8 million
- Box office: $666,922 (Italy)

Someday This Pain Will Be Useful to You is a 2011 comedy-drama film directed by Roberto Faenza, who co-wrote the screenplay with Dahlia Heyman, based on Peter Cameron's 2007 novel of the same name. It is primarily Italian-financed but was shot in English. The teenage American protagonist was played by eighteen-year-old English actor Toby Regbo and the supporting cast is mainly American.

The film premiered at the 6th Rome Film Festival and was scheduled for release in Italy in February 2012. It received its North American premiere at the 2012 Miami International Film Festival, but no further cinematic release dates have been announced.

The Italian reviews were mixed, but considerable praise was given for Regbo's performance.

== Premise ==
A drama that follows James Sveck (Toby Regbo), a recent high school graduate in New York City, who feels out of step with his privileged upbringing.

== Cast ==
- Toby Regbo as James Sveck
- Marcia Gay Harden as Marjorie Dunfour
- Peter Gallagher as Paul Sveck
- Deborah Ann Woll as Gillian Sveck
- Ellen Burstyn as Nanette, James' grandmother
- Siobhan Fallon Hogan as Mrs. Beemer
- Lucy Liu as Rowena Adler, life coach
- Stephen Lang as Barry Rogers
- Gilbert Owuor as John Webster
- Aubrey Plaza as Jeanine Breemer

== Production ==
Filming took place in New York from August 18 to October 4, 2010.

== Reception ==
On the review aggregator website Rotten Tomatoes, 9% of 11 critics' reviews are positive. Metacritic, which uses a weighted average, assigned the film a score of 20 out of 100, based on 6 critics, indicating "generally unfavorable" reviews.
