= What Happens at Night =

Upcoming film by Martin Scorsese

- Directed by: Martin Scorsese
- Screenplay by: Patrick Marber
- Based on: What Happens at Night by Peter Cameron
- Produced by: Martin Scorsese; Leonardo DiCaprio; Jennifer Lawrence; Daniel Lupi
- Starring: Leonardo DiCaprio; Jennifer Lawrence; Mads Mikkelsen; Patricia Clarkson; Jared Harris
- Cinematography: Rodrigo Prieto
- Edited by: Thelma Schoonmaker
- Production companies: Apple Studios; StudioCanal; Sikelia Productions; Appian Way Productions; Excellent Cadaver
- Distributed by: Apple Original Films
- Countries: United States; France
- Language: English

What Happens at Night is an upcoming Gothic psychological horror film directed by Martin Scorsese and adapted by Patrick Marber from the 2020 novel by Peter Cameron. It stars Leonardo DiCaprio, Jennifer Lawrence, Mads Mikkelsen, Patricia Clarkson and Jared Harris.

== Premise ==
A married American couple travel to a small, snowy European town to adopt a baby. As they struggle to claim their baby, they seem to know less about each other.

== Cast ==
- Leonardo DiCaprio as The Man
- Jennifer Lawrence as The Woman
- Mads Mikkelsen as Brother Emmanuel
- Patricia Clarkson as Livia Pinheiro-Rima
- Jared Harris as Henk Bosma
- Welker White
- Ilinca Manolache
- Gabriel Spahiu
- Charli XCX

== Production ==
In April 2023, it was announced that the film What Happens at Night would be produced by Martin Scorsese from a script by Patrick Marber adapted from the 2020 novel of the same name by Peter Cameron. In September 2025, it was reported that Scorsese was set to direct the film, with Leonardo DiCaprio and Jennifer Lawrence joining the cast in the lead roles. Apple Original Films was in talks to distribute and co-produce the film with a planned January 2026 shoot. Scorsese, Lawrence and DiCaprio were previously tapped to work on a Frank Sinatra biopic before production was postponed the year prior. Deadline Hollywood's Justin Kroll reported that, while DiCaprio was rumored for many roles that year, What Happens at Night was the project that the trio were secretly aiming for after the script had been finished earlier in the year. Later that month, DiCaprio stated Scorsese had him rewatch Alfred Hitchcock's Vertigo (1958) as a "reference point" for the film. In December 2025, Mads Mikkelsen joined the cast. In January 2026, Patricia Clarkson joined the cast. In February, Jared Harris joined the cast. In March 2026, Welker White joined the cast. On March 20, Jeff Sneider reported that Marber's script was rewritten by an uncredited Paul Thomas Anderson at the request of DiCaprio. In May 2026, Ilinca Manolache and Gabriel Spahiu were revealed as a part of the cast. In October, Charli XCX was announced as having a cameo role in the film.

=== Filming ===
Principal photography began in the Czech Republic on February 24, 2026. Filming also took place in Switzerland. On May 29, it was reported that the film was now in post-production.
