= What Happens at Night (novel) =

2020 American novel

- Author: Peter Cameron
- Language: English
- Genre: Gothic; mystery fiction
- Set in: Northern Europe
- Publisher: Catapult Books
- Publication date: August 4, 2020
- Pages: 301
- ISBN: 978-1948226967

What Happens at Night is a gothic mystery novel by the American author Peter Cameron. It follows an unnamed American couple who attempt to adopt a child in a remote town in Europe, and meet several unusual people. The book was a finalist of the Los Angeles Times Book Prize in 2020.

== Plot ==
An unnamed American couple travel to a remote northern European country in order to adopt a child. The woman is terminally ill with advanced cancer, having previously undergone a hysterectomy, and the couple's inability to have biological children has placed strain on their marriage. They hope that adopting a child will provide purpose and stability as the woman's condition worsens.

The couple arrive in an isolated town and stay at the fictional Borgarfjardarsysla Grand Imperial Hotel while arranging the adoption through a local orphanage. The hotel is largely empty and staffed by a small number of employees, and it houses several unusual guests. During their stay, the man encounters Livia Pinheiro-Rima, an elderly woman, and Henk Bosma, a traveling businessman whose behavior is erratic. The man later engages in a sexual encounter with Bosma. Meanwhile, the woman becomes entangled in the administrative processes required to adopt a child. She also seeks out Brother Emmanuel, a local religious healer, in the hope of improving her condition.

== Development ==
What Happens at Night is the seventh novel by the American writer Peter Cameron. It was published by Catapult Books on August 4, 2020.

== Reception ==
The book received mostly positive reviews. In a review for the Lambda Literary Foundation, Mikey Byrd praised the book's humor and characterization, but criticized the "forced pathos". Publishers Weekly praised the characterization of Livia Pinheiro-Rima, calling her "particularly memorable", but criticized that of Brother Emmanuel; ultimately, the magazine described the novel as an "admirable tale emotionally affecting". Beth Mowbray for The Nerd Daily rated the book a 10/10. Sam Sacks for The Wall Street Journal also praised the novel, including its atmosphere and tone.

The book was a finalist of the 2020 Los Angeles Times Book Prize, in the fiction category.

== Film adaptation ==
In September 2025, it was announced that filmmaker Martin Scorsese would adapt the novel into a film of the same name starring Leonardo DiCaprio and Jennifer Lawrence.
