= Peter Cameron (novelist) =

American novelist

- Born: November 29, 1959 (age 66); Pompton Plains, New Jersey, U.S.
- Education: Hamilton College
- Occupations: Novelist; Short story writer

Peter Cameron (born November 29, 1959) is an American novelist and short-story writer. Several of his works have been adapted into films.

== Life and career ==
Cameron was born and raised in the Pompton Plains section of Pequannock Township, New Jersey. He graduated in English literature in 1982 from Hamilton College. Cameron lived in Pompton Plains, London, and, later, New York City.

In 1983, he published his first short story (Memorial Day) in The New Yorker; he then continued to contribute to the magazine in the following years. His first book was a collection of short stories entitled One Way or Another, published by Harper & Row in 1986. His debut novel Leap Year was published by Harper & Row in 1990. His second novel, The Weekend, was published in 1994 by Farrar, Straus and Giroux, and adapted as the Brian Skeet film of the same name released in November 2000. In 1997, Farrar, Straus and Giroux published Cameron's next novel, Andorra. They followed up with The City of Your Final Destination in 2002, which in 2009 was adapted into a film of the same name directed by James Ivory. In October 2007, Cameron's young adult novel Someday This Pain Will Be Useful to You was published and in October 2012 it was adapted into a film of the same name. In March 2012, he published Coral Glynn. His latest novel, What Happens at Night, was published by Catapult in August 2020. A film version of What Happens at Night is currently being made, directed by Martin Scorsese and starring Jennifer Lawrence and Leonardo DiCaprio.

In addition to his work as a writer, he has taught at Columbia, Yale Sarah Lawrence College and Bennington College. Between 1990 and 1998, he worked for the Lambda Legal Defense and Education Fund. In 2010, he founded Wallflower Press, whose name had to change in January 2014 to Shrinking Violet Press due to a rights conflict with Columbia University.

== Influences ==
Cameron was influenced by authors such as Rose Macaulay, Barbara Pym and Margaret Drabble, borrowing their aptitude for probing individual lives.

== List of works ==
=== Novels ===
- Leap Year (1990)
- The Weekend (1994)
- Andorra (1997)
- The City of Your Final Destination (2002)
- Someday This Pain Will Be Useful to You (2007)
- Coral Glynn (2012)
- What Happens at Night (2020)

=== Collections ===
- One Way or Another (1986)
- Far-flung (1991)
- The Half You Don't Know (1997)

== Adaptations ==
- The Weekend (2000)
- The City of Your Final Destination (2009)
- Someday This Pain Will Be Useful to You (2011)
- What Happens at Night (Post-production)
