= I Heard You Paint Houses =

2004 book by Charles Brandt

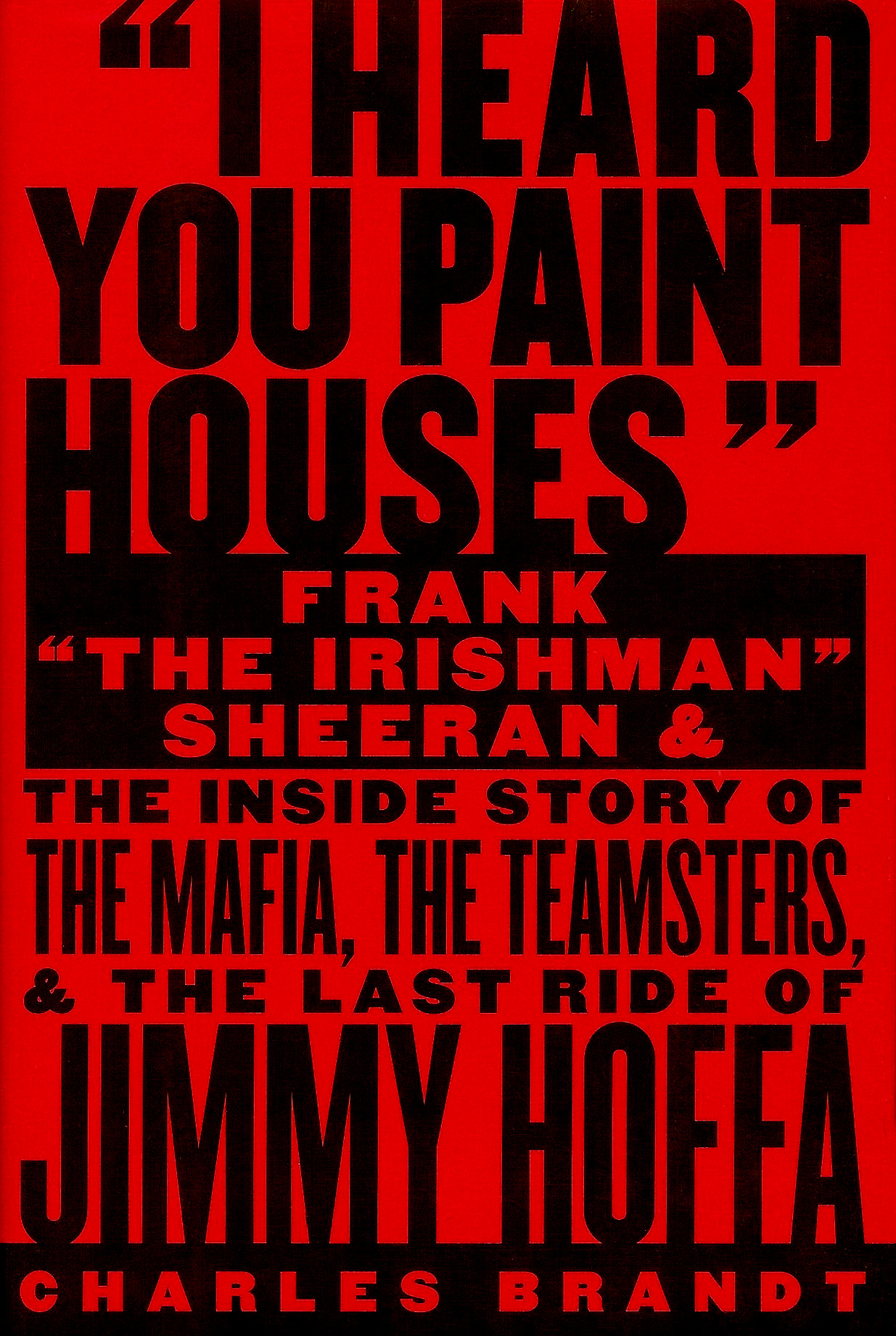
- Author: Charles Brandt
- Language: English
- Subject: Frank Sheeran; American Mafia
- Genre: Memoir
- Publisher: Steerforth Press
- Publication date: 2004
- Publication place: United States of America
- Media type: Print (hardcover & paperback), E-book, audio cassette, audio CD, Audible Audio Edition, Amazon Kindle
- Pages: 384
- ISBN: 978-1586422387
- Dewey Decimal: 364.1'06'0973—dc22
- LC Class: HV6446.B73 2004

I Heard You Paint Houses: Frank "The Irishman" Sheeran and Closing the Case on Jimmy Hoffa is a 2004 work of narrative nonfiction written by former homicide prosecutor, investigator, and defense attorney Charles Brandt that chronicles the life of Frank Sheeran, an alleged mafia hitman who confesses the crimes he committed working for the Bufalino crime family.

According to Sheeran, the title is the beginning of the first telephone conversation between him and labor leader Jimmy Hoffa, and was spoken by the latter. "Painting houses" is a mob code for carrying out contract killings, with the "paint" being the victim's blood that spatters on the walls from the gunshot. Sheeran replied that he also did his own "carpentry," meaning that he disposed of the bodies.

Later editions of the book contain 71 pages of back matter largely detailing independent corroboration of Sheeran's confessions that came to light after the book was first published.

== Content ==
=== Hitman claims ===
Sheeran's supposed confessions to killing both Hoffa and Joe Gallo have been disputed by "The Lies of the Irishman", an article in Slate by Bill Tonelli, and "Jimmy Hoffa and 'The Irishman': A True Crime Story?" by Harvard Law School professor Jack Goldsmith, which appeared in The New York Review of Books. Chip Fleischer, the book's publisher, wrote a reply to Tonelli's piece, also published in Slate, calling the magazine's decision to run the article with a title he claims is not supported by the facts "irresponsible in the extreme, not to mention damaging."

=== Gunrunning claims ===
According to Sheeran, on the orders of Jimmy Hoffa and Russell Bufalino, he drove a truck from Baltimore to Florida containing weapons that would be used in the Bay of Pigs invasion in 1961. He stated that he was involved with David Ferrie in this endeavor who he met at Baltimore, there Ferrie informed him that he was to drop a trailer full of weapons, which had come from the Maryland National Guard, off to E. Howard Hunt of the CIA in Florida.

He also claimed to have transported rifles to be used in assassinating president John F. Kennedy. According to Sheeran, he met Tony Provenzano at Monte's Restaurant, who gave him a duffle bag filled with high-powered rifles. He claimed to have taken a bag down to Campbell's Cement in Baltimore where he handed it off to an associate of the Genovese family. He alleged that he did not know what the rifles were to be used for at the time, but that Hoffa later told him they were used in Dallas, and that "Those fuckers used both of us on that deal. We were patsies".

== Adaptation ==
The book is the basis for the 2019 film The Irishman, which was directed by Martin Scorsese and starred Robert De Niro as Frank Sheeran.
