= Charles Brandt =

American investigator and writer (1942–2024)

- Born: March 13, 1942; New York City, U.S.
- Died: October 22, 2024 (aged 82); Wilmington, Delaware, U.S.
- Education: University of Delaware; Brooklyn Law School
- Occupations: Author; attorney; investigator
- Notable work: I Heard You Paint Houses
- Spouses: Kathleen McGaw (m. 1963, divorced); Nancy Poole (m. 1976)
- Children: 1 (2 stepchildren)

Charles Peter Brandt (March 13, 1942 – October 22, 2024) was an American investigator, lawyer, writer, and speaker. He wrote the narrative non-fiction Frank Sheeran memoir I Heard You Paint Houses, the basis for the 2019 film The Irishman, directed by Martin Scorsese and starring Robert De Niro, Al Pacino, and Joe Pesci.

== Background ==
Charles Peter Brandt was born in the Staten Island borough of New York City on March 13, 1942, and grew up there and in Queens. After attending Stuyvesant High School, he was educated at the University of Delaware as an undergraduate before going on to earn a law degree from Brooklyn Law School. During law school, he also worked as a welfare investigator in East Harlem, which he said was heavy with organized crime activity at the time. In 1969, he began his legal career in the office of the attorney general of Delaware, prosecuting homicides, before becoming a defense lawyer.

== Writing ==
Brandt's first book, the novel The Right to Remain Silent, was published in 1988. Shortly thereafter, he was hired as a lawyer for Frank Sheeran, and they had early conversations developing the project that would one day become I Heard You Paint Houses. However, they did not undertake serious work on it for years, as they did not want the book to be released while many of its subjects were still alive. The book was not published until 2004, one year after Sheeran himself had died.

Afterward, Brandt published three more books, the last of which was Suppressing the Truth in Dallas: Conspiracy, Cover-Up, and International Complications in the JFK Assassination Case (2022), which forwards the conspiracy theory that the mafia was involved with the assassination of John F. Kennedy.

== Personal life and death ==
In 1963, Brandt married Kathleen McGaw; they later divorced. In 1976, he married Nancy Poole; they had a daughter, and he became a stepfather to two children. He lived in the cities of Wilmington and Lewes in Delaware, and in Sun Valley, Idaho.

Brandt died at a hospice in Wilmington on October 22, 2024, at the age of 82.

== Books ==
- Brandt, Charles (1988). The Right to Remain Silent. Bodley Head. ISBN 978-0370312132.
- Brandt, Charles (2004). I Heard You Paint Houses. Pushkin Press. ISBN 978-1586422387.
- Brandt, Charles & Pistone, Joseph D. (2008). Donnie Brasco: Unfinished Business. Running Press. ISBN 9780762432288.
- Brandt, Charles (2012). We're Going to Win This Thing: The Shocking Frame-up of a Mafia Crime Buster. National Geographic Books. ISBN 978-0425246092.
- Brandt, Charles (2022). Suppressing the Truth in Dallas: Conspiracy, Cover-Up, and International Complications in the JFK Assassination Case. Post Hill Press. ISBN 978-1637583159.
