= Frank Sheeran =

American mobster and labor union official (1920–2003)

- Sheeran's 1980 mugshot
- Born: Francis Joseph Sheeran; October 25, 1920; Darby, Pennsylvania, U.S.
- Died: December 14, 2003 (aged 83); West Chester, Pennsylvania, U.S.
- Resting place: Holy Cross Cemetery, Yeadon, Pennsylvania, U.S.
- Other name: The Irishman
- Occupation: Teamsters union official
- Organization: Local 326, International Brotherhood of Teamsters
- Spouses: Mary Leddy (m. 1946; div. 1968) Irene Gray (m. 1968; died 1995)
- Children: 4
- Allegiance: Bufalino crime family
- Conviction: Labor racketeering (1980)
- Penalty: 32 years imprisonment
- Military career
- Allegiance: United States
- Branch: United States Army
- Service years: 1941–1945
- Units: Military Police Corps; 45th Infantry Division
- Conflicts: World War II; Italian Campaign; Operation Husky; Allied invasion of Italy; Operation Avalanche; Battle of Anzio; Operation Dragoon; Invasion of Germany

Francis Joseph Sheeran (October 25, 1920 – December 14, 2003), also known as "The Irishman", was an American labor union official and enforcer for Jimmy Hoffa and Russell Bufalino. Raised in a devoutly Catholic Irish-American family in Darby, Pennsylvania, a working-class town near Philadelphia, he grew up poor during the Great Depression and enlisted in the US Army after the attack on Pearl Harbor in 1941. He served with the 45th Infantry Division during the Italian Campaign in the Mediterannean Theater as both an infantryman and in the Military Police Corps. After returning to Pennsylvania, he did various odd jobs before becoming involved with the Teamsters and its president, Jimmy Hoffa.

Sheeran was a leading figure involved in the infiltration of unions by organized crime in the 1960s and ‘70s, and allegedly helped the Teamsters assist the CIA with the Bay of Pigs Invasion in 1961. He was accused of having links to the Bufalino crime family, including its boss, Russell Bufalino, in his capacity as a high-ranking official in the International Brotherhood of Teamsters (IBT), the president of Local 326 in New Castle, Delaware. In 1980, he was convicted of labor racketeering and sentenced to 32 years in prison, of which he served 13 years. He then went to live at a nursing home in West Chester, Pennsylvania.

Shortly before his death in 2003, he said he had killed Teamster leader Jimmy Hoffa in 1975. Author Charles Brandt detailed what Sheeran told him about Hoffa in the alleged confession in the narrative nonfiction work I Heard You Paint Houses (2004). The truthfulness of the book, including Sheeran's confessions to killing Hoffa and Joe Gallo, has been disputed by journalists, former mobsters, and FBI agents. The book is the basis for the 2019 film The Irishman directed by Martin Scorsese which starred Robert De Niro as Sheeran, Al Pacino as Hoffa, Harvey Keitel as Angelo Bruno and Joe Pesci as Russell Bufalino.

== Early life ==
Sheeran was born and raised in Darby, Pennsylvania, a small working-class borough on the outskirts of Philadelphia. He was the son of Thomas Francis Sheeran Jr. and Mary Agnes Hanson and had two younger siblings - his brother Tom and sister Margaret. His father was of Irish descent, while his mother was of Swedish descent. During the Depression, Frank would sometimes help his father steal food from farms near their home to feed the family.

Sheeran's childhood lacked affection and he quickly started working odd jobs to support his family, his first was when he was seven cleaning ash from cellars. His father would often take a young Frank into bars and make Frank fight other mens sons to win money for beer, other times his father would force his son to box against him without hitting back. When not fighting against his father he would also box against neighborhood kids. When he was a teenager Frank attended Upper Darby High School (then known as Darby High School) in Drexel Hill, Pennsylvania. He was later expelled after insulting and attacking the principal of the school.

Time spent with the carnival

After getting expelled, Frank joined a traveling carnival as a laborer which Frank described as:

...No Ringling Brothers; it was a honky-tonk carnival.

This carnival would take Frank up and down the Eastern Seaboard until they reached Maine where he joined a logging company where he would find himself boxing his coworkers again. He worked other odd jobs and made his way back to Philadelphia where Frank would discover another one of his passions in dancing.

== World War II ==
Sheeran enlisted in the United States Army in August 1941, completed basic training near Biloxi, Mississippi, and was assigned to the military police. Following the attack on Pearl Harbor, he volunteered for training in the Airborne at Fort Benning, Georgia, but he dislocated his shoulder and was transferred to the 45th Infantry Division, known as "The Thunderbirds" and "The Killer Division". On July 14, 1943, he set sail for North Africa.

Sheeran served 411 days of combat duty—a significant length of time, as the average was around 100 days. His first combat experience was during the Italian Campaign, including the invasion of Sicily, the Salerno landings, and the Anzio Campaign. He then served in the landings in southern France and the invasion of Germany.

Sheeran said:

All in all, I had fifty days lost under AWOL—absent without leave—mostly spent drinking red wine and chasing Italian, French, and German women. However, I was never AWOL when my outfit was going back to the front lines. If you were AWOL when your unit was going back into combat you might as well keep going because one of your own officers would blow you away and they didn't even have to say it was the Germans. That's desertion in the face of the enemy.

=== War crimes ===
Sheeran recalled his war service as the time when he developed a callousness to taking human life. He claimed to have participated in numerous massacres and summary executions of German POWs, acts which violated the Hague Conventions of 1899 and 1907 and the 1929 Geneva Convention on POWs. In interviews with Charles Brandt, he divided such massacres into four categories:

1. Revenge killings in the heat of battle. Sheeran told Brandt that a German soldier had just killed his close friends and then tried to surrender, but he chose to "send him to hell, too". He described often witnessing similar behavior by fellow G.I.s.
2. Orders from unit commanders during a mission. Sheeran described his first murder for organized crime: "It was just like when an officer would tell you to take a couple of German prisoners back behind the line and for you to 'hurry back'. You did what you had to do."
3. The Dachau reprisals and other reprisal killings of Nazi concentration camp guards and trustee inmates.
4. Calculated attempts to dehumanize and degrade German POWs. Sheeran's unit was climbing the Harz Mountains when they came upon a Wehrmacht mule train carrying food and drink up the mountainside. The female cooks were allowed to leave unmolested, then Sheeran and his fellow GIs "ate what we wanted and soiled the rest with our waste". Then the Wehrmacht mule drivers were given shovels and ordered to "dig their own shallow graves". Sheeran joked that they did so without complaint, likely hoping that he and his buddies would change their minds. The mule drivers were shot and buried in the holes they had dug. Sheeran explained that by then, he "had no hesitation in doing what I had to do."

=== Discharge and post-war ===
Sheeran was discharged from the army on October 24, 1945. He later recalled that it was "a day before my twenty-fifth birthday, but only according to the calendar." Upon returning from his army service, Sheeran married Mary Leddy, an Irish immigrant. The couple had three daughters, MaryAnne, Dolores, and Peggy, but divorced in 1968. Sheeran then married Irene Gray, with whom he had one daughter, Connie. Irene died in December 1995.

== Organized crime and the Teamsters Union ==
When he left the service, Sheeran became a driver for Food Fair and he met Russell Bufalino in 1955 when Bufalino offered to help him fix his truck, and later worked jobs driving him around and making deliveries. Sheeran also operated out of a bar located in Sharon Hill, Pennsylvania, which was run by Bill Distanisloa, a soldier under the then powerful Philadelphia crime family captain and future acting boss Angelo Bruno.

According to his biography, Sheeran's first murder was killing Whispers DiTullio, a gangster who had hired him to destroy the Cadillac Linen Service in Delaware for $10,000. However, Sheeran did not know that Angelo Bruno had a large stake in the linen service. Sheeran was spotted outside the business and was brought in for questioning. Bufalino had convinced Bruno to spare Sheeran but he ordered Sheeran to kill DiTullio as retribution. Sheeran was also suspected of the murder of Joe Gallo at Umberto's Clam House on April 7, 1972.

Bufalino introduced Sheeran to Teamsters International President Jimmy Hoffa. According to Sheeran, Hoffa became a close friend and used Sheeran for muscle, including the assassination of disloyal union members and members of rival unions threatening the Teamsters' turf. Sheeran claimed that in the first conversation he had with Hoffa over the phone, Hoffa started by saying, "I heard you paint houses" — mob code for "I heard you kill people" (the "paint" being spattered blood). Sheeran later became acting president of Local 326 of the Teamsters Union in Wilmington, Delaware.

=== Gunrunning claims ===
Sheeran claimed to his biographer Charles Brandt that on the orders of Jimmy Hoffa and Russell Bufalino he drove a truck from Baltimore to Florida containing weapons that would be used in the Bay of Pigs invasion in 1961. He stated that he was involved with David Ferrie in this endeavor who he met at Baltimore, there Ferrie informed him that he was to drop a trailer full of weapons, which had come from the Maryland National Guard, off to E. Howard Hunt of the CIA in Florida.

== Prison and death ==
Sheeran was charged in 1972 with the 1967 murder of Robert DeGeorge, who was killed in a shootout in front of Local 107 headquarters. However, the case was dismissed on the grounds that Sheeran had been denied a speedy trial. He was also alleged to have conspired to murder Francis J. Marino, a Philadelphia labor organizer, in 1976, and Frederick John Gawronski, who was killed the same year in a tavern in New Castle, Delaware.

Sheeran was indicted along with six others in July 1980, on charges involving his links to the labor leasing businesses controlled by Eugene Boffa Sr. of Hackensack, New Jersey. On October 31, 1980, Sheeran was found guilty of 11 charges of labor racketeering. He was sentenced to a 32-year prison term and served 13 years.

Sheeran died of cancer on December 14, 2003, at the age of 83, in a nursing home outside West Chester, Pennsylvania. He was buried at Holy Cross Cemetery in Yeadon, Pennsylvania.

== Hoffa death ==
In the years leading up to Hoffa’s death, he had been in a feud with mobster Anthony Provenzano about union leadership.

Charles Brandt writes in I Heard You Paint Houses (2004) that Sheeran confessed to killing Hoffa on July 30, 1975. According to Brandt's account, Chuckie O'Brien drove Sheeran, Hoffa, and fellow mobster Salvatore Briguglio to a house in Metro Detroit. Upon entering, Sheeran claims that he shot Hoffa twice in the back of the head. Sheeran says that he was told that Hoffa was cremated after the murder. Sheeran also confessed to reporters that he murdered Hoffa, as well as Gallo. Bill Tonelli disputes the book's truthfulness in a Slate article, as does Harvard Law School professor Jack Goldsmith in The New York Review of Books.

The FBI has examined evidence which could connect Sheeran to the murder of Hoffa, including using the latest advances in forensic technology to test remnants of blood and floorboards from the house where Hoffa was reputedly killed. Although bloodstains were found in the Detroit house where Sheeran claimed that the murder had happened, they were determined not to match Hoffa's DNA.

== Biographical film ==
The book "I Heard You Paint Houses" by Charles Brandt is the basis for the 2019 film The Irishman directed by Martin Scorsese. Scorsese was long interested in directing a film about Sheeran's life and his alleged involvement in the slaying of Hoffa. Steven Zaillian is the screenwriter, and producer Robert De Niro portrays Sheeran, Al Pacino plays Hoffa, and Joe Pesci plays Bufalino. The film premiered at the New York Film Festival on September 27, 2019, and was released on November 1, 2019. Digital streaming started on November 27, 2019, via Netflix.
