= Reality Check =

Reality Check may refer to:

- Reality Check (comics), an English language manga series
- Reality Check (program), an anti-tobacco movement led by teenagers and operated by the New York State Department of Health
- Reality check, a technique used in lucid dreaming to determine whether one is actually dreaming
- Reality Check, the signature move of wrestler The Miz
- Reality Check, daily comic strip since 1995 by Dave Whamond
- Reality Check (film), a 2002 horror film by Rafal Zielinski

== Television ==
- Reality Check (American TV series), a 1995 syndicated series
- Reality Check: Inside America's Next Top Model, a 2026 Netflix documentary series
- Reality Check (2013 TV series), a Hong Kong drama produced by TVB
- Reality Check (Australian TV series), a 2014 Australian panel discussion program
- "Reality Check" (Mutant X), a 2003 episode
- "Reality Check", a recurring segment on the sketch comedy show Mad TV
- "Reality Check" (Revival), a 2025 episode

== Music ==
- Reality Check (Jassi Sidhu album), a 2003 album by Punjabi singer, Jassi Sidhu
- Reality Check (Juvenile album), a 2006 album by rapper Juvenile
- Reality Check (Seagram album), a 1995 album by rapper Seagram
- Reality Check (The Teenagers album), a 2008 album by The Teenagers
- Reality Check (band), a Christian music band
- "Reality Check", a song by Binary Star from Masters of the Universe
- "Reality Check", a song by Man Overboard from Heavy Love
- "Reality Cheque", a song by Status Quo from Quid Pro Quo

== Literature ==
- Reality Check (novel), a 2009 novel by Peter Abrahams
- "Reality Check", a science fiction short story by David Brin
- "Reality Check", a science fiction short story by Michael A. Burstein

== See also ==
- Reality Checkpoint
- "And the Reality Check", an episode of 2 Broke Girls
