= The Fan (1996 film) =

1996 film directed by Tony Scott

- Theatrical release poster
- Directed by: Tony Scott
- Screenplay by: Phoef Sutton
- Based on: The Fan by Peter Abrahams
- Produced by: Wendy Finerman
- Starring: Robert De Niro; Wesley Snipes; John Leguizamo; Benicio del Toro; Ellen Barkin
- Cinematography: Dariusz Wolski
- Edited by: Claire Simpson; Christian Wagner
- Music by: Hans Zimmer
- Production companies: Mandalay Entertainment; Scott Free Productions; Wendy Finerman Productions
- Distributed by: TriStar Pictures (through Sony Pictures Releasing)
- Release date: August 16, 1996
- Running time: 116 minutes
- Country: United States
- Language: English
- Budget: $55 million
- Box office: $42 million

The Fan is a 1996 American sports psychological thriller film directed by Tony Scott and starring Robert De Niro, Wesley Snipes and Ellen Barkin based on the 1995 novel by Peter Abrahams. The Fan was released by TriStar Pictures (through Sony Pictures Releasing) on August 16, 1996. The film received generally negative reviews from critics and was a box-office flop, grossing $42 million against a $55 million budget.

== Plot ==
Gil Renard is a troubled baseball fan whose favorite team, the San Francisco Giants, have just signed a $40 million contract with his favorite player, Bobby Rayburn. His ex-wife Ellen obtains a restraining order after arguing with the short-tempered Gil over his neglect of their child, and Gil is fired from his job as a knife salesman after viciously insulting a prospective customer.

An embittered Gil begins obsessing over Rayburn. When Rayburn suffers a chest injury during a game and his performance slumps, Gil antagonizes fans who jeer him. Rayburn has also been in conflict with teammate Juan Primo over who gets to keep the number 11 place. Gil, thinking Primo is to blame for Rayburn's performance, confronts him in a hotel sauna in an attempt to persuade him to let Rayburn have the number. Primo reveals his shoulder, branded with the number 11, and refuses. This leads to a struggle in which Gil fatally stabs Primo in the leg. After feeling guilty about Primo's death and taking Jewel Stern's (the movie's principal radio host) advice to not focus so much on being perfect, Rayburn starts playing well again.

Thinking Rayburn does not acknowledge his fans, Gil goes to his beach house and saves his son Sean from drowning. He persuades Rayburn to play a game of catch on the beach. Rayburn states he stopped caring about the game after Primo's death because he felt there were more important things in life. He also tells Gil he has lost respect for the fans, remarking on their fickle nature. An angered Gil nearly hits Rayburn with a fastball and launches into a diatribe. Rayburn is disturbed, especially when Gil takes off his jacket to reveal Rayburn's uniform underneath and asks if he is happy Primo is no longer around.

Rayburn soon discovers Gil has kidnapped Sean and their dog Bradley and driven off in his Hummer. When he contacts him through the vehicle’s car phone, Gil directs him to the branded flesh from Primo's shoulder in the freezer. Driven insane by his idol's disrespect, Gil attempts to emotionally manipulate Sean into seeing him as his real father. He drives to see an old friend, Coop. Coop tries to help Sean escape, revealing that Gil lied about having played professional ball; his only experience was a brief stint in Little League. Gil beats Coop to death with a baseball bat before recapturing Sean, hiding him in an abandoned baseball field.

Gil contacts Rayburn to make one demand: hit a home run in the upcoming game and dedicate it to Gil, or he will kill his son. With the police on alert, Gil enters Candlestick Park in the midst of an on-and-off thunderstorm. Rayburn struggles with his emotions while at bat. After several pitches, he hits the ball deep into the outfield but not over the fence. Rayburn then attempts to score an inside-the-park home run. He is called out, although he is obviously safe. Rayburn argues with the umpire, who turns out to be Gil in disguise.

Rayburn knocks Gil to the ground. Dozens of cops and Giants players swarm onto the field and confront Gil, only for him to fatally stab one of the players in front of the crowd. Despite warnings from the police and appeals from Rayburn, Gil goes into an exaggerated pitching motion with a knife in hand. Rayburn asks Gil where Sean is, but Gil nonchalantly says he is in the "big stadium in the sky". Gil is fatally shot by the police as he is about to throw the knife. Police discover Sean at the Little League field, named the "Stadium in the Sky", where Gil once played in his childhood. They uncover his obsession with Rayburn as hundreds of newspaper clippings adorn his hideout. A picture on the wall shows Gil in his past glory, playing Little League baseball and winning a championship game.

== Cast ==
- Robert De Niro as Gil Renard / Curly
- Wesley Snipes as Bobby Rayburn
- Ellen Barkin as Jewel Stern
- John Leguizamo as Manny
- Benicio del Toro as Juan Primo
- Patti D'Arbanville as Ellen Renard
- Chris Mulkey as Tim (Richie's stepfather)
- Andrew J. Ferchland as Richie Renard
- Brandon Hammond as Sean Rayburn
- Charles Hallahan as Coop
- Dan Butler as Garrity (Gil's boss)
- Kurt Fuller as Bernie (Jewel's co-worker)
- John Kruk as Lanz, one of Rayburn's teammates
- Stanley DeSantis as Stoney
- Don S. Davis as Stook, Giants' manager
- Michael Jace as a ticket scalper
- M. C. Gainey as a Giants fan
- Aaron Neville as himself (opening game singer)
- Jack Black as a radio broadcast technician

== Production ==
During a prescreeening of the film, representatives of Major League Baseball and the San Francisco Giants expressed unhappiness with the profanity and violence depicted in the film. They asked for at least a dozen changes be made before its scheduled release date in which Tristar Pictures took in consideration while maintaining the integrity of the project. Rayburn was intended to be an analogue of Barry Bonds, and Giants players shot cameo appearances in the film which were not included. Exteriors were shot at Candlestick Park, while Anaheim Stadium doubled for some inside the ballpark shots.

According to director Tony Scott, Brad Pitt, Al Pacino and Wesley Snipes wanted to play the role of Gil.

== Music ==
=== Soundtrack ===
The Fan: Music from the Motion Picture

Soundtrack album by Various artists
- Released: August 20, 1996
- Recorded: 1996
- Genres: Electronic, hip hop, rock
- Length: 68:51
- Label: TVT

Professional ratings
Review scores
Source	Rating
Allmusic	2/5 stars

The Fan: Music from the Motion Picture is the soundtrack to the 1996 film The Fan. It was released on August 20, 1996, through TVT Records and is a combination of electronic and hip hop music.

Track listing

1. "Did You Mean What You Said?" - 3:49 (Sovory, Michael Mishaw, Marc Antoine)
2. "Letting Go" - 5:35 (Terence Trent D'Arby)
3. "Unstoppable" - 3:46 (Mic Geronimo)
4. "Hymn of the Big Wheel" - 6:34 (Massive Attack)
5. "I've Had Enough" - 2:43 (Kenny Wayne Shepherd)
6. "Little Bob" - 5:35 (Black Grape)
7. "Border Song (Holy Moses)" - 3:37 (Raymond Myles)
8. "What's Goin' Down" - 4:18 (Honky)
9. "Deliver Me" - 3:58 (Foreskin 500)
10. "Forever Ballin'" - 4:24 (Big Syke & Johnny "J")
11. "I'm da Man" - 5:24 (Jeune)
12. "Sacrifice" - 19:08 (Hans Zimmer)
13. "Bem, Bem, Maria" - (Gipsy King)

=== Score ===
The score was composed by Tony Scott’s frequent collaborator, Hans Zimmer. Zimmer has expressed particular pride in the score despite the film’s commercial failure. He said: “It was a shitty movie, I know that, but it was a great experience. A producer at DreamWorks listened to my music and after three minutes she ran away screaming. A week later she called me to say that she was having nightmares ever since. I thought, ‘Yeah, this stuff is really good!’ And I know no one bought the CD, but it was a great experiment and it is as Zimmer as it gets.” He later reiterated his appreciation for the score, describing it as one of his most underrated works: “I’ve done a lot of movies that failed, The Fan being one example. Nobody went to see the movie, and the score is unflinchingly dissonant. There’s a nihilistic poem that I read through a vocoder and you cannot understand the words, but it’s really evil. Don’t-try-this-at-home type of music.”

The Fan: Original Motion Picture Score

Film score by Hans Zimmer
- Released: July 23, 2026
- Genre: Film score
- Length: 108:31
- Label: La-La Land Records

La-La Land Records released a limited edition 2-CD set of the original motion picture score in mid-July 2026.

Disc 1
No.	Title	Length
1.	"The Fan - Interview Request"	2:39
2.	"Selling Montage"	1:06
3.	"Hospital"	1:01
4.	"Primo/Bob Collide - Bobby Rayburn Bats"	5:33
5.	"Back To Stadium - Forgive Me"	3:45
6.	"Gil Gets Sacked"	6:40
7.	"Bob Strikes Out"	2:01
8.	"Precious Touch"	1:31
9.	"Primo In / Bobby Out"	1:47
10.	"Bobby Hits Again"	1:33
11.	"Shit Head"	1:04
12.	"Gil Saves Son - Thank You"	3:30
13.	"Fans Are Losers"	0:50
14.	"Stopped Caring"	5:34
15.	"What Do You Want?"	4:15
16.	"A True Fan"	2:20
17.	"Coop Dies"	2:07
18.	"Stadium In The Sky - Game Resumes"	13:42

Disc 2
No.	Title	Length
1.	"The Fan Suite (Hans' Original Sketchbook)"	10:21
2.	"Letting Go (Performed by Terence Trent D'Arby)"	6:56
3.	"Out Of Time"	3:28
4.	"The Fan Suite (Remix)"	7:40
5.	"Sacrifice (Original Album Suite)"	19:07

== Release ==
The film was theatrically released on August 16, 1996. A home video release followed on January 28, 1997.

== Reception ==
=== Box office ===
The film grossed $18,626,419 in the United States and Canada. The opening weekend was $6,271,406 and it dropped 47.2% the next weekend. Internationally, it grossed $23.6 million for a worldwide total of $42.2 million.

=== Critical response ===
On Rotten Tomatoes, The Fan has an approval rating of 42%, based on reviews from 31 critics. The website's critics' consensus states: "Tony Scott's visceral flash proves to be an ill fit for The Fan, a queasy tale of obsession that succeeds at making audiences uncomfortable, but strikes out when it comes to delivering the thrills." On Metacritic, the film has a weighted average score of 32 out of 100, based on reviews from 16 critics, indicating "generally unfavorable" reviews. Audiences surveyed by CinemaScore gave the film a grade "B−" on a scale of A+ to F.

Variety wrote that the film was "utterly bankrupt artistically, psychologically and morally, and unconvincing." Rolling Stone pointed out that De Niro was "persuasive" and "moving" but as his character "slipped into madness" the film slipped with him, "substituting crass exploitation for insight" stating that "the moment De Niro's character breaks from reality, the film does, too. Entertainment Weekly pointed out that "the more The Fan turns into a thriller, the less it thrills."

About the movie’s reception, Director Tony Scott said: “I’ve had very few critical acclaims as far as my films go. I’ve always been slammed. What happened with The Fan was devastating when I read the press.“ He added: “It was a shame, because I had such a great experience making that film. I think part of the problem was I made some bad character choices. For instance, I thought De Niro’s character was such a gentle human being. But by the time we finished the first two acts, it became a stalker movie. It’s about a guy stalking a baseball star. And by the time you came to the third act, De Niro’s character is a lost soul. I made him into that vindictive stalker. So, the fault was mine in terms of the choices and the way I was trying to push it“.

== Themes ==
The core tension of the movie revolves around the jarring realization that an athlete who is worshipped can be self-centered and initially dismissive of their supporters. Reviewers often point out that this cynical dynamic forces viewers to question the toxic nature of modern celebrity culture.

== See also ==
- Swimfan
- Der Fan
- Perfect Blue
- Big Fan
- Fan (2016)
- List of American films of 1996
- List of baseball films
