= The Fan (Abrahams novel) =

1995 novel by Peter Abrahams

- Author: Peter Abrahams
- Publisher: Warner Books
- Publication date: March 10, 1995
- Pages: 352

The Fan is a 1995 novel by American author Peter Abrahams. It is a psychological thriller that follows Gil Renard as he progresses into his own insanity. The story revolves around baseball and explores the overt dedication displayed by some of its fanatics.

In 1996, the novel was adapted to film as The Fan.

== Reception ==
Publishers Weekly called it a "taut novel" and a "finely crafted, edge-of-the-seat thriller." Warren Goldstein, in The Washington Post, wrote that it was a "finely-crafted suspense story." Kirkus Reviews considered it "forceful, straight-ahead storytelling, a tale of two fascinating characters set against the backdrop of Major League Baseball."
