= Behind the Curtain =

Book by Peter Abrahams

Behind The Curtain
- Author: Peter Abrahams
- Language: English
- Series: Echo Falls Mystery Series
- Genre: Young adult, Mystery novel
- Publisher: HarperCollins
- Publication date: 2006
- Publication place: United States
- Media type: Print (Paperback)
- Pages: 374 pp
- ISBN: 0-06-073706-9
- OCLC: 123713811
- Preceded by: Down The Rabbit Hole
- Followed by: Into the Dark

Behind the Curtain is the second book in the Echo Falls mystery series by best-selling crime novelist Peter Abrahams.

== Plot summary ==
Ingrid lives in a small community called Echo Falls. She's in the school soccer team and is in the drama club. Everything is normal until one day she sees what her dad has been looking at on his computer. On the Jobs.com site. He suddenly starts getting temperamental. Throughout the next few days, Ingrid notices other weird things occurring like her brother starts getting more buff but has strange pimples on his back, and her soccer coach getting switched with another very odd coach, Julia LeCaine. Ingrid starts to try to find out what is happening and in the midst of it, on a random day when she is outside going to the MathFest, she gets kidnapped. She finds herself in the trunk of a car and escapes. But she doesn’t know who tried to kidnap her and if they would try again. Throughout the book Ingrid has to face many mysterious and scary situations to find out what is happening! Guided by her hero, Sherlock Holmes, it's not going to be easy for this 13-year-old!

She soon realizes that the new coach, Julia LeCaine, was the one who kidnapped her for money. After she escapes the kidnapping, which happened on the MathFest, a day she was told to show up for she was one of the contestants, barely anyone believes her, and if they did, they had doubts. Luckily, Chief Strade, father of Joey Strade (who is Ingrid's friend/romantic interest) believes her, but cannot act upon it too much, for there are too many holes in her story.

During all this, Ingrid's brother, Ty, starts taking steroids, an illegal drug sold by the Krackens (her not-so-friend, Chloe's servants). though she's quite sure of this, she doesn't want her brother to get in trouble, so she has to prove the crime herself by pretending to be a buyer. She brings a tape recorder along with her, with hopes of recording their conversation and showing it to Chief Strade. She writes a note on Carl Kraken Jr's janitor desk to meet them at the tree house she and Ty used to hang out in. She only meets Carl Senior, the oldest living Kraken, and nearly buys the steroids but is foiled when her recorder gave her away. After a quick chase in the woods, the three Krakens catch her, but Chief Strade and some other cops rescue her and arrest the Krakens.

== Reception ==
Kirkus Reviews wrote "In a literature notoriously light on solid mysteries, Abrahams’s second outing for kids stands out as a deliciously plotted, highly satisfying adventure." while Publishers Weekly, in reviewing the audio version, stated "youngsters who have never read a Sherlock Holmes story will be won over by the perilous adventure so expertly presented."
