= Ruff vs. Fluff =

2019 novel by Spencer Quinn

- Author: Spencer Quinn
- Illustrator: Peter Abrahams
- Cover artist: Jennifer Taylor
- Language: English
- Series: Queenie and Arthur
- Publisher: Scholastic Corporation
- Publication date: March 26, 2019
- Publication place: United States
- Pages: 320
- ISBN: 978-1-338-09139-7
- Followed by: Paws vs. Claws

Ruff vs. Fluff is a children's novel written and illustrated by Spencer Quinn and published by Scholastic Inc. in 2019. Ruff vs. Fluff is part of the Queenie and Arthur series.

== Background ==
Ruff vs. Fluff focuses on Queenie the cat and Arthur the dog throughout the series. Ruff vs. Fluff was published on May 5, 2020

== Plot summary ==
Queenie, a cat, and Arthur, a dog, reside at the Blackberry Hill Inn, which is owned by a divorced mom who has twins Harmony and Bro. The two animals are sworn enemies but join forces to clear the name of the twins' cousin who gets wrongly accused of committing murder.

== Reception ==
In a positive review of the book, Jean Westmoore of The Buffalo News wrote, "The narration by scheming cat and clueless hound is hilariously spot on. ... Appealing characters, a vivid setting and a well-crafted plot inspired by booze-smuggling of the Prohibition years make this series launch a winner." In a negative review, Kirkus Reviews said, "it makes for a slow unfolding of the mystery and much obvious authorial manipulation to get the animals where they need to be to overhear vital facts; compounding this problem, although they both speak perfect English to readers, they can’t even communicate with each other. The cast is default white. Fans of Quinn’s previous work may enjoy the new character set, but there are too many fine furry detectives out there to spend time with these two."

Children's Bookwatch reviewer Diana Perry said, "This is an engaging, action-adventure with riddles that young readers will have so much fun trying to solve. The ultimate bedtime story." She further said, "This is the perfect early reader. Kids will love following the clues to solve the mystery."

== Sequels ==
- Paws vs. Claws
- Bark vs. Snark
