= Down the Rabbit Hole (novel) =

Novel by Peter Abrahams

- First edition
- Author: Peter Abrahams (crime fiction)
- Language: English
- Series: Echo Falls Mystery Series
- Genre: Young adult novel/Mystery novel
- Publisher: HarperCollins
- Publication date: 2005
- Publication place: United States
- Media type: Print (Paperback)
- Pages: 448 pp
- ISBN: 0-06-073704-2
- OCLC: 61109255
- LC Class: PZ7.A1675 Beh 2006
- Followed by: Behind the Curtain

Down the Rabbit Hole is a 2005 young adult mystery novel by best-selling crime novelist Peter Abrahams, the first book in the Echo Falls mystery series. It was the winner (tied) of the 2005 Agatha Award for Best Children's/Young Adult Fiction.

This book was used in the 2008-2009 Battle Of The Books.

== Plot ==
Ingrid Levin-Hill, 13 year old girl, runs from the orthodontist's office thinking she needs to get to soccer practice. She ends up lost and meets Cracked-Up Katie, who calls her a cab and takes Ingrid to her house. After a conversation, Katie goes strange, and Ingrid catches the cab. But a few hours later, Katie was announced murdered and Ingrid realized that she left her soccer cleats there...and then, alongside more soccer, Algebra, homework, and the play, Ingrid realizes she must solve the case on her own.
