= Rosie Gray =

American journalist

Rosie Gray is a journalist covering politics and media. Previously a reporter for BuzzFeed News, she has also worked for The Atlantic.

== Life and career ==
Originally from Massachusetts, and born into a Jewish family, Gray's father is the American crime-fiction author Peter Abrahams.

Gray studied at New York University, wrote for The Village Voice, and then began covering politics for BuzzFeed News, where she gained recognition for her coverage of Occupy Wall Street.

In 2016, The Atlantic hired Gray to cover global affairs and U.S. politics. In March 2017, Gray was named as the White House correspondent for The Atlantic. Shortly thereafter, it was announced that she signed a deal with HarperCollins to write a book about Breitbart News, reportedly receiving an advance of about $350,000. In January 2019, Politico reported that Gray would be returning to Buzzfeed News as media and politics reporter, beginning in April. BuzzFeed News shut down in 2023.

She is married to British journalist Ben Judah.
