= Parker's Piece =

Park in Cambridge, England

Coordinates: 52°12′08″N 00°07′40″E

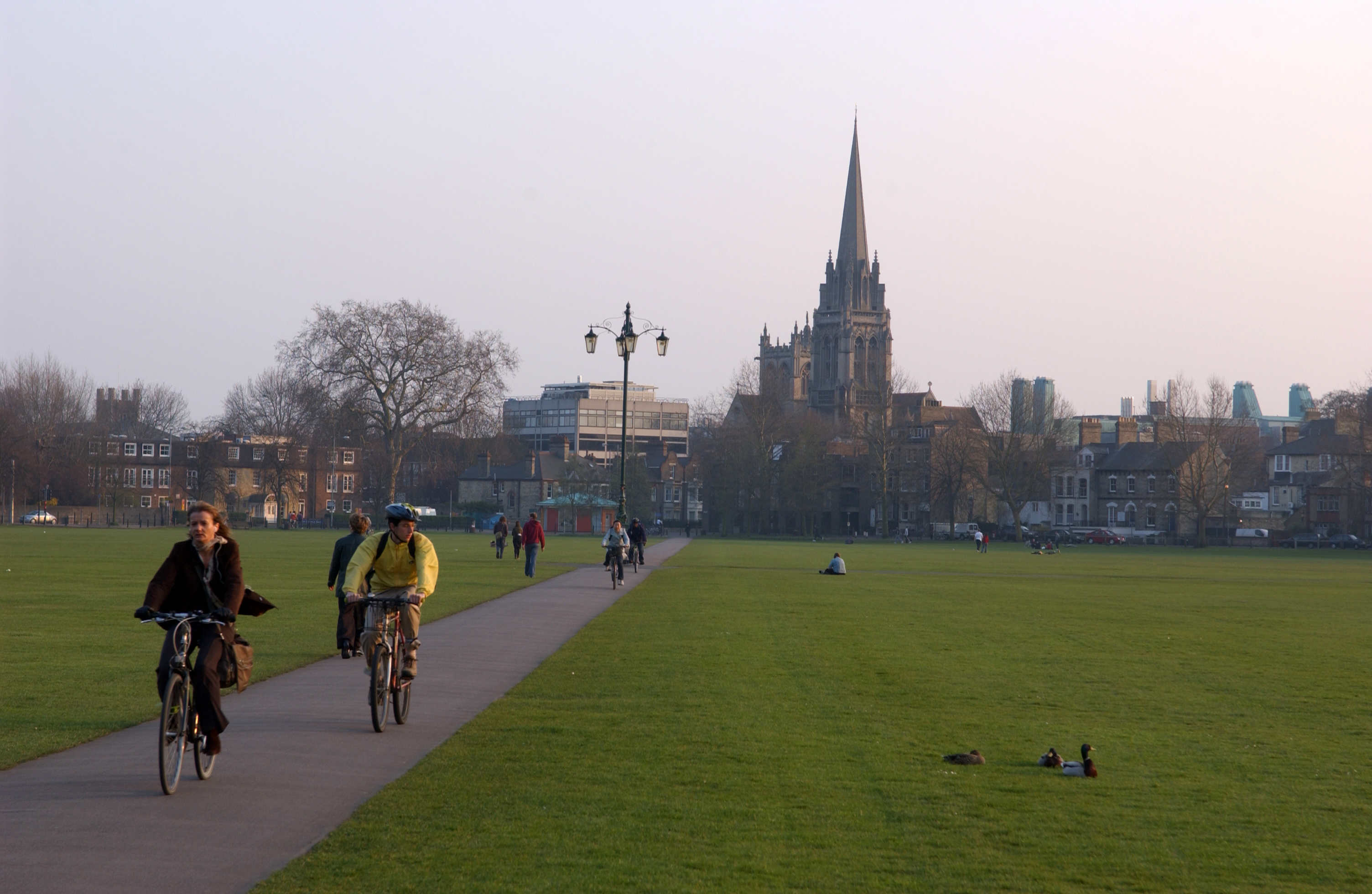
Looking towards Our Lady and the English Martyrs Church

Parker's Piece is a 25-acre (100,000 m^{2}) flat and roughly square green common located near the centre of Cambridge, England, regarded by some as the birthplace of the rules of association football. The two main walking and cycling paths across it run diagonally, and the single lamp-post at the junction is colloquially known as Reality Checkpoint. The area is bounded by Park Terrace, Parkside, Gonville Place, and Regent Terrace. The Cambridge University Football Club Laws were first used on Parker's Piece and adopted by the Football Association in 1863. "They embrace the true principles of the game, with the greatest simplicity" (E. C. Morley, F.A. Hon. Sec. 1863). 'The Cambridge Rules appear to be the most desirable for the Association to adopt' (C. W. Alcock 1863, FA committee member and founder of the FA Cup).

The grass is mown and the area is known today chiefly as a spot for picnics and games of football and cricket, and serves as the games field for nearby Parkside Community College. Fairs tend to be held on the rougher ground of Midsummer Common. Daytime events and concerts are occasionally held on the Regent's Terrace side of Parker's Piece, while north-western quarter is still maintained as a venue for league cricket.

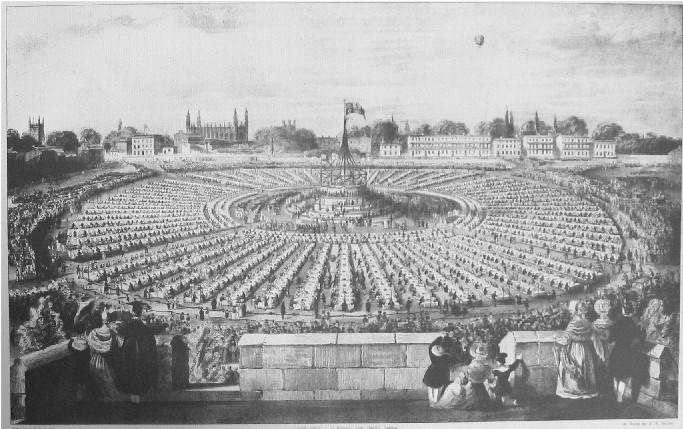
The coronation feast of 1838.

In 1838, a feast for 15,000 guests was held on Parker's Piece to celebrate the coronation of Queen Victoria. There is a blue plaque dedicated to Jack Hobbs on the wall of the building known locally as Hobbs Pavilion.

== History ==
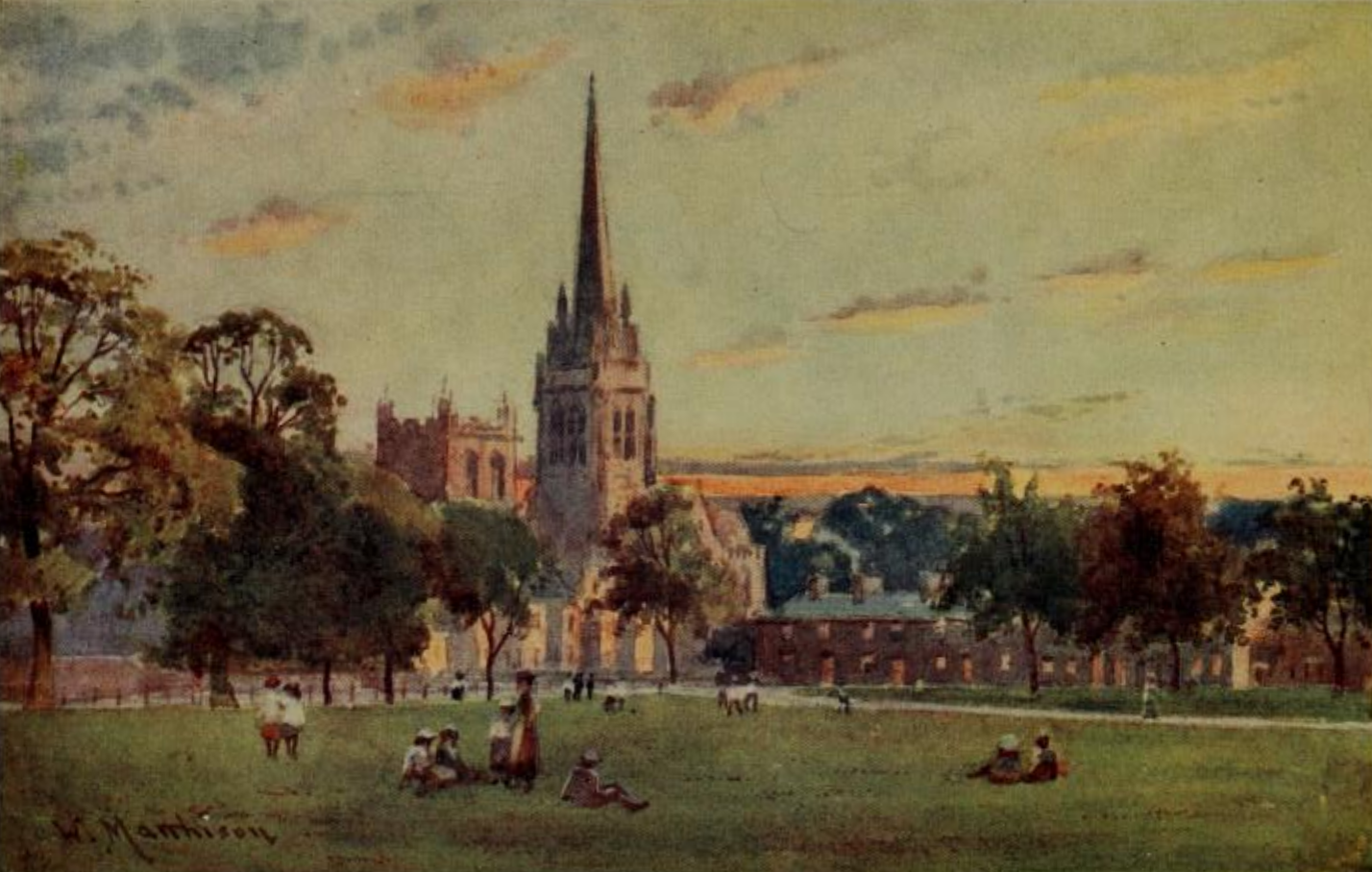
Illustration of Parker's Piece (1907)

Before 1613, Parker's Piece was owned by Trinity College. In that year, the college exchanged it with the town of Cambridge for Garrett Hostel Green, a site east of the River Cam where the Wren Library of Trinity College now stands. Parker's Piece takes its name from Edward Parker, a Trinity College cook who had leased 15 acres of this land from the college since 1587, the other 10 acres being held by Elizabeth Sherwood.

As a cricket ground, Parker's Piece was used for 49 first-class matches from 1817 to 1864 as the home ground of Cambridge Town Club (1817–1864, as Cambridge Town Club, Cambridge Union Club, Cambridge Town and County Club and Cambridgeshire; 36 matches, including 29 against Cambridge University Cricket Club) and Cambridge University Cricket Club (1835–1847; 13 matches, all against Marylebone Cricket Club).

In the 19th century, it was one of the principal sports grounds used by students at the University of Cambridge and the site of numerous varsity matches against Oxford.

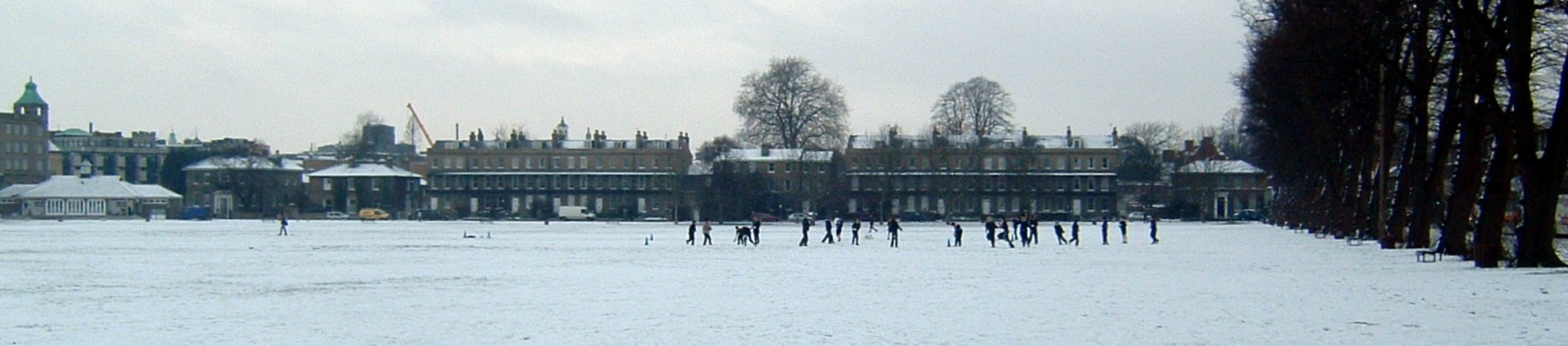
Looking towards Park Terrace during snow in March 2005. Hobbs Pavilion is on the left.

== Parker's Piece and football ==
In the 19th century, football was also commonly played on this ground, as is described in the following quotation from George Corrie, Master of Jesus College (1838): "In walking with Willis we passed by Parker's Piece and there saw some forty Gownsmen playing at football. The novelty and liveliness of the scene were amusing!"

=== Rules of football ===
Parker's Piece has a special place in the history of modern football games, as it was here that several versions of the Cambridge Rules were first put into practice. The 1863 Cambridge rules, advertised in sporting newspapers as newly created for a "game [that] will be played on Friday, 20 Nov, [1863] at 2:15 p.m. on Parker's Piece", played a significant role in the creation of the first laws of the Football Association published in December of that year.

=== Modern passing tactics ===
The move by the Cambridge University AFC away from Parker's Piece in 1882 coincided with the side's significant role in the development of the modern passing, combination game. In a detailed investigation into the evolution of football tactics based upon contemporary accounts, Adrian Harvey refers to the teams responsible for the early development of the passing game (including Sheffield, The Royal Engineers and Queens Park) but comes to the following conclusion about the finished, modern team product: "Curiously, the side that was generally credited with transforming the tactics of association football and almost single-handedly inventing the modern game was not a professional team but the Cambridge University XI of 1882. Contemporaries described Cambridge as being the first "combination" team in which each player was allotted an area of the field and played as part of a team in a game that was based upon passing". In a discussion by C.W. Alcock on the history of a "definite scheme of attack" and "elaborate combination" in football playing style, he states in 1891: "The perfection of the system which is in vogue at the present time however is in a very great measure the creation of the last few years. The Cambridge University eleven of 1882 were the first to illustrate the full possibilities of a systematic combination giving full scope to the defence as well as the attack"

=== Commemoration ===
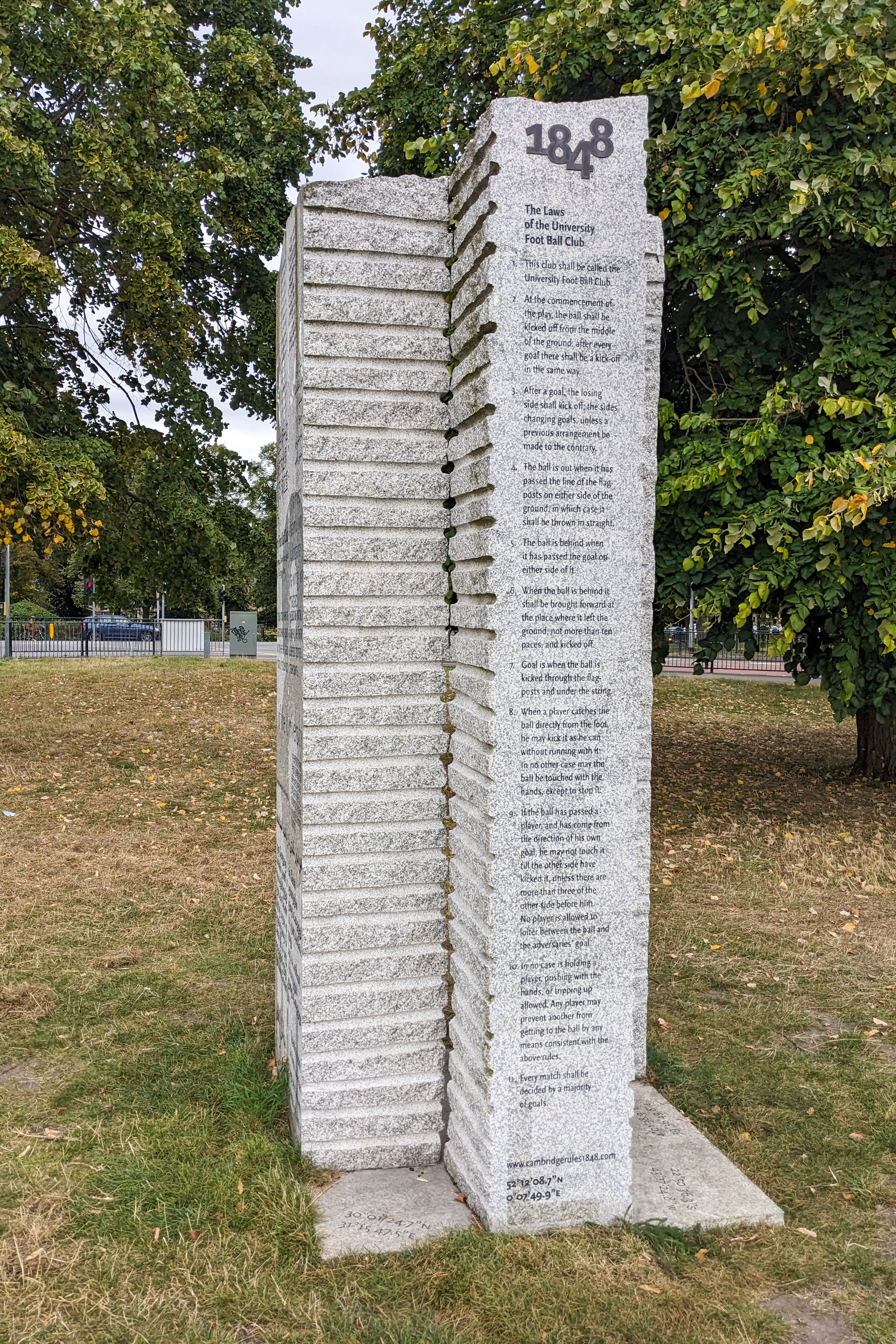
The "Cambridge Rules 1848" monument

In 2000, a plaque was erected in Parker's Piece by a football team consisting of homeless people. It bears the following inscription:

Here on Parker's Piece, in the 1800s, students established a common set of simple football rules emphasising skill above force, which forbade catching the ball and 'hacking'. These 'Cambridge Rules' became the defining influence on the 1863 Football Association rules.

In May 2013, Cambridge City Council proposed that a 2-metre (6.6-foot) statue by artist Gordon Young, in the form of a Subbuteo referee on top of a circular plinth engraved with Cambridge Rules be installed on Parker's Piece to mark the 150th anniversary of the publication of the 1863 Football Association rules and Parker's Piece's association with it. The proposal was rejected in June 2013 before public consultation due to negative feedback and concerns with Hasbro, which markets Subbuteo, and the possibility of significantly exceeding its original £88,000 budget.

In May 2018, a monument titled "Cambridge Rules 1848" was installed on Parker's Piece. The monument consists of four stone pillars, engraved with the 1856 Cambridge Rules translated into several languages.

== Trial lighting ==
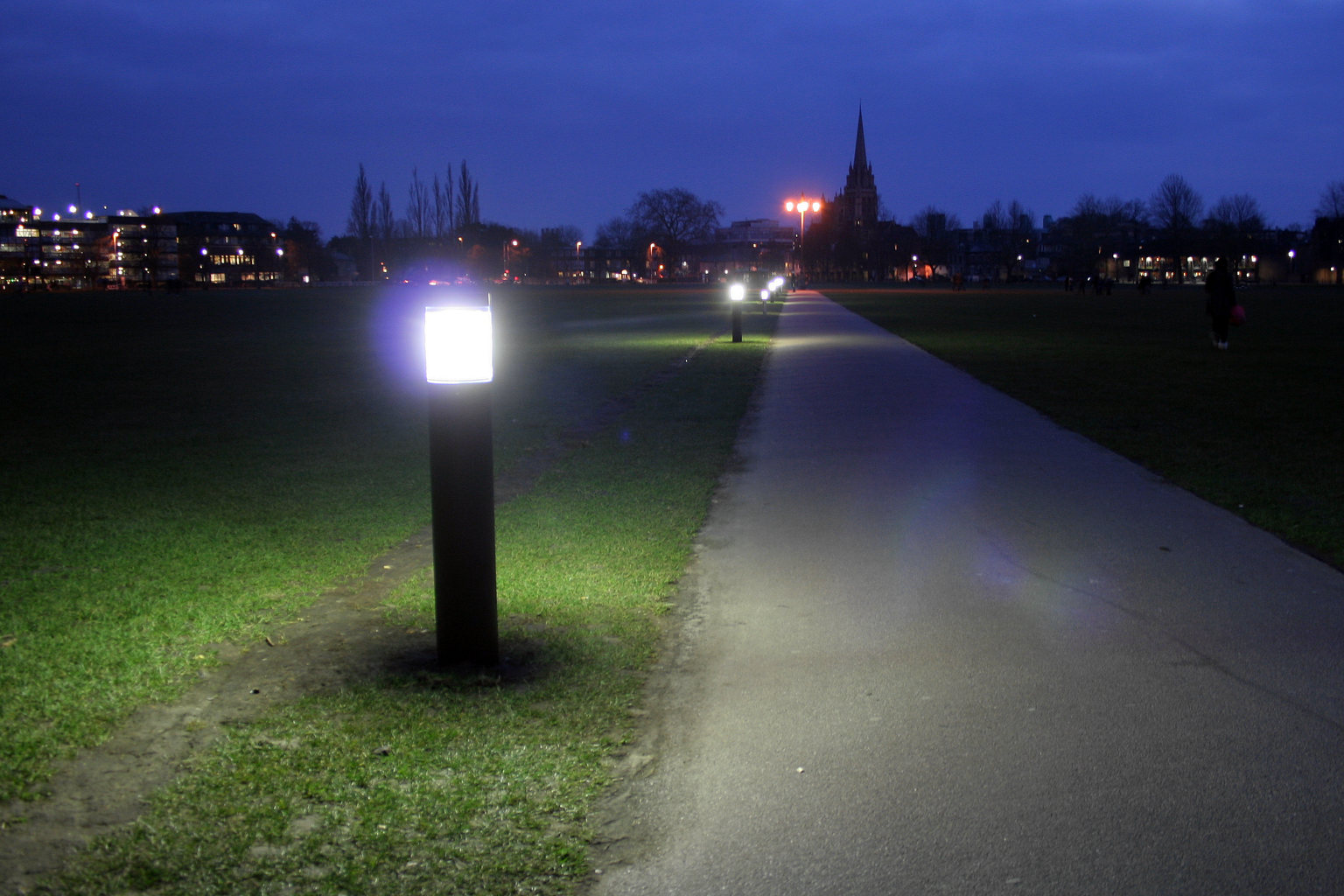
Trial lighting in February 2013

For a four-week trial beginning January 2013, lighting bollards were temporarily installed along the northwest path, between Reality Checkpoint and Melbourne Place, as residents and students had claimed that Parker's Piece was unsafe after dark. Several attacks had previously occurred in the park.

== Parkside ==
Parkside is the street on the north-east side of the park. Since 2006 it has been the terminus for long-distance coach services, visitor coaches and a stopping point for local bus services. The street is the location of the city's police and fire stations, and provides access to Parkside Community College.

== Gallery ==
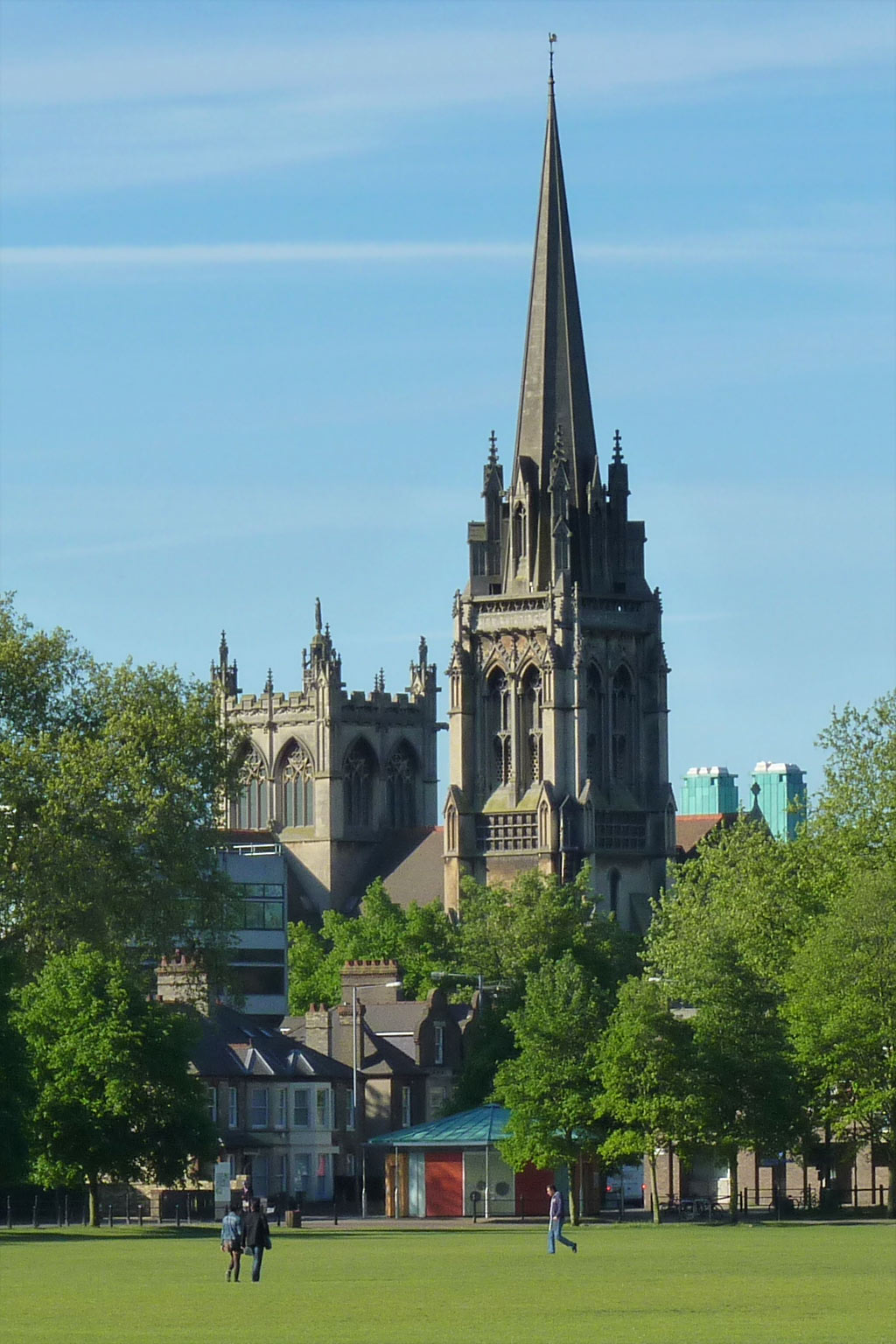
The Catholic church of Our Lady and the English Martyrs viewed from Parker's Piece.

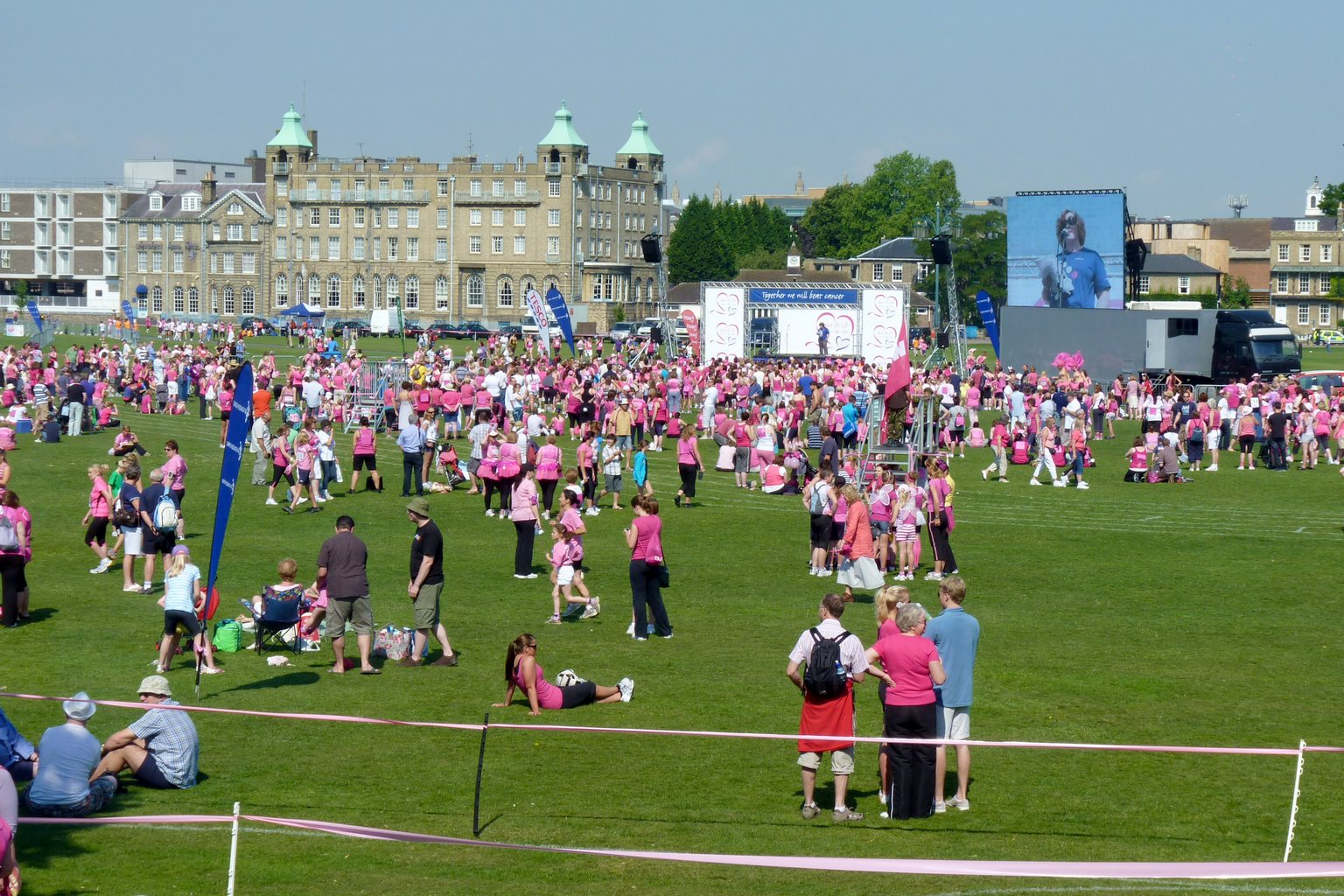
Race for Life 2011 at Parker's Piece. The turreted building in the background is the De Vere University Arms Hotel.

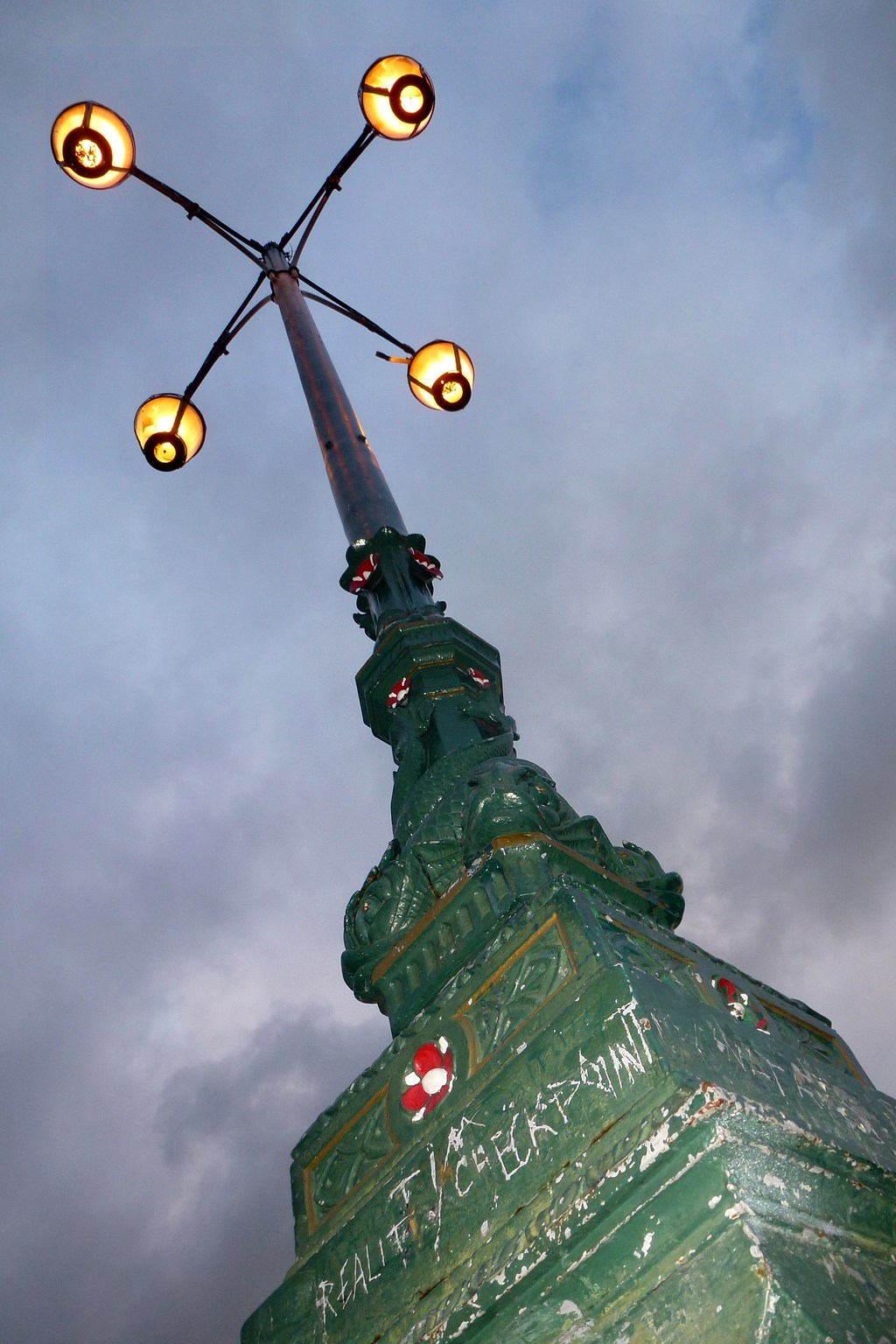
Detail of the Reality Checkpoint lamp-post

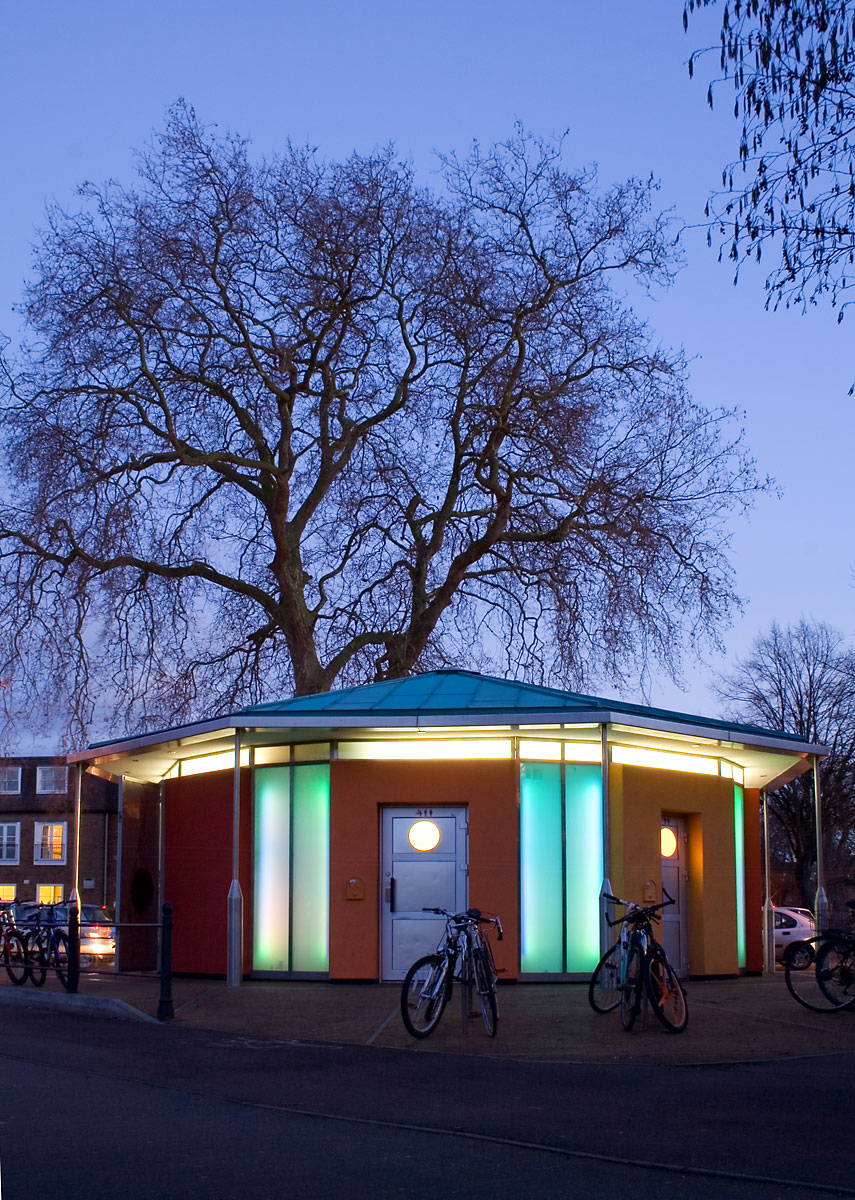

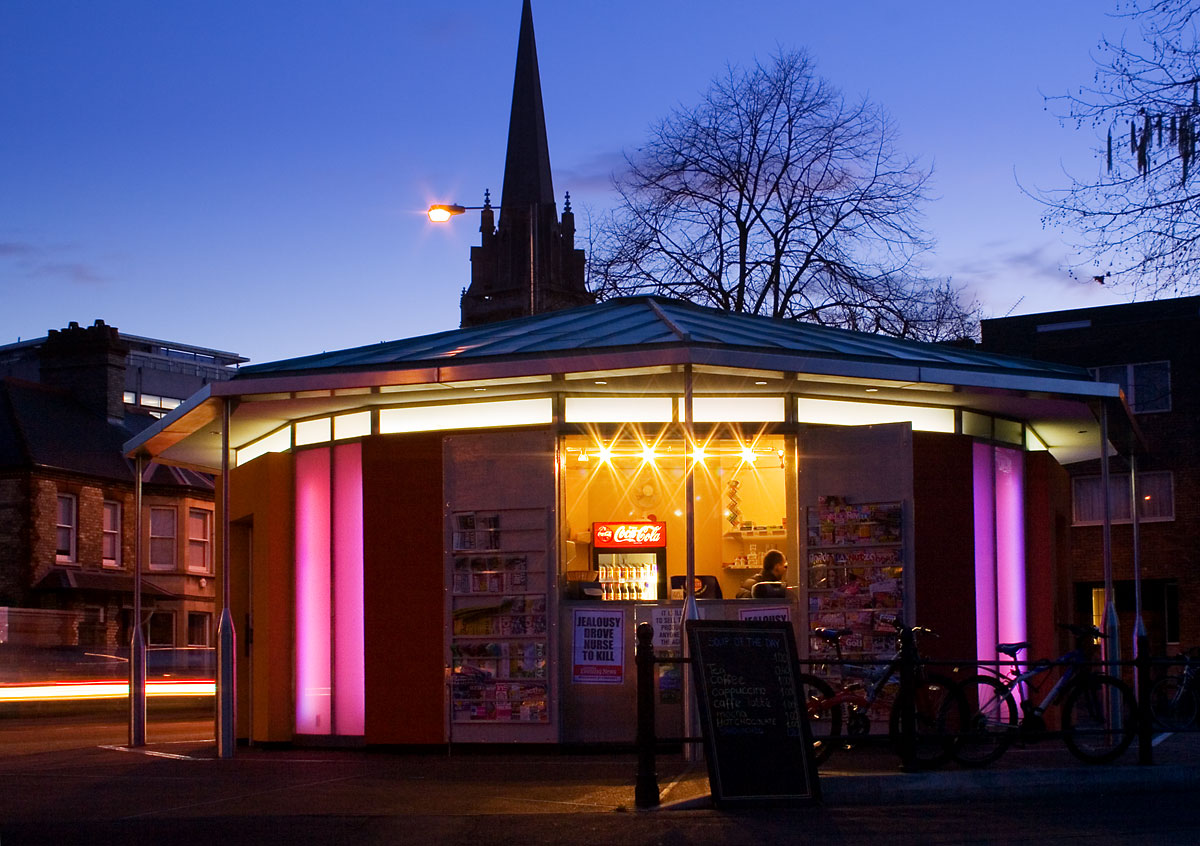

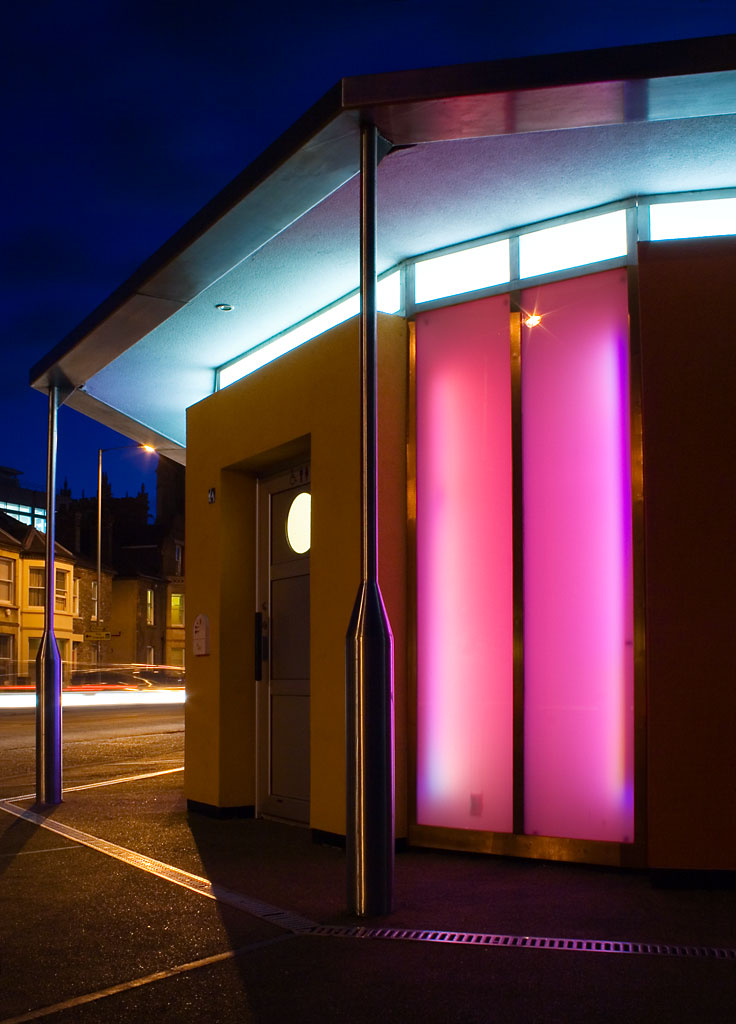

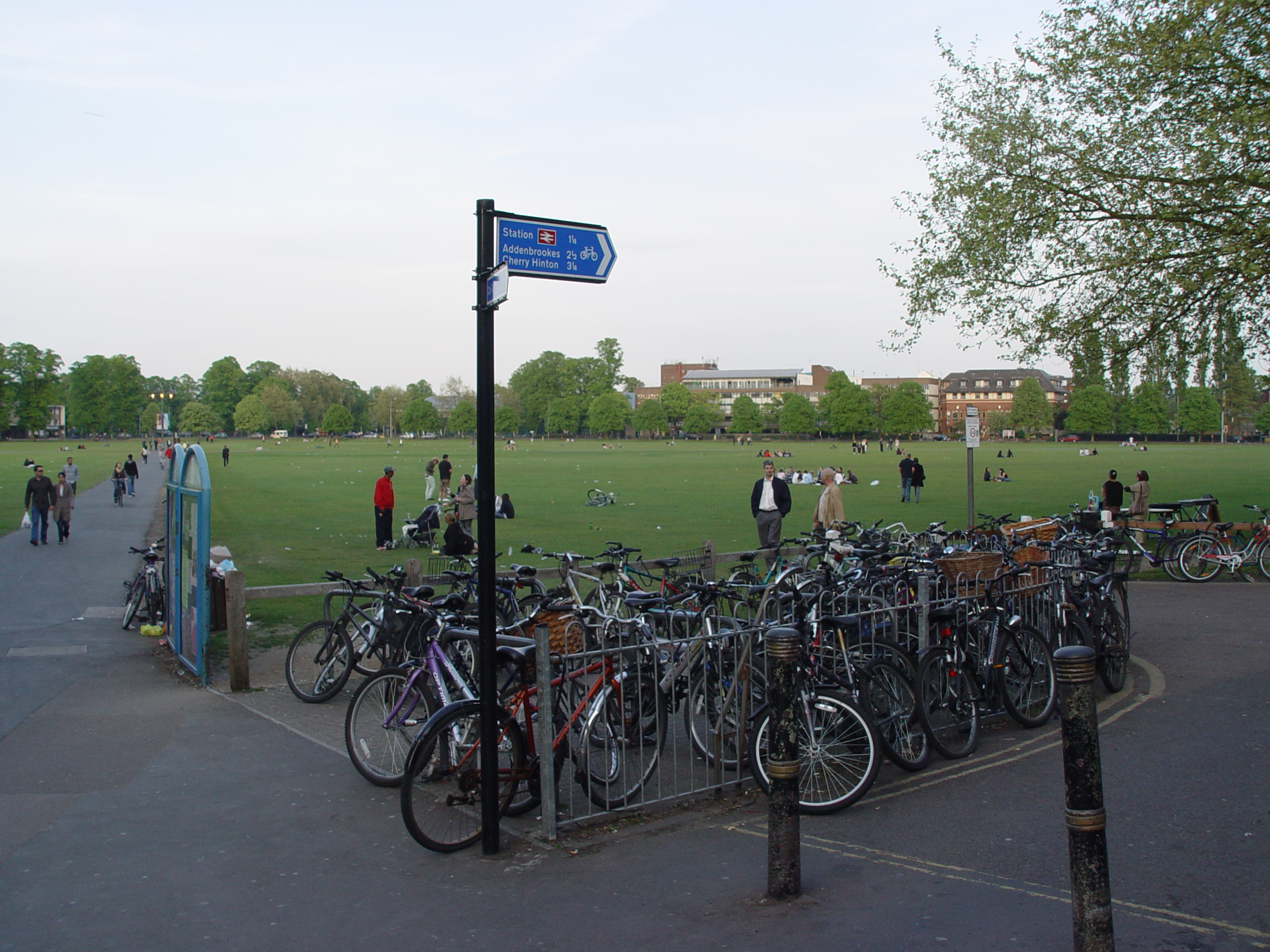

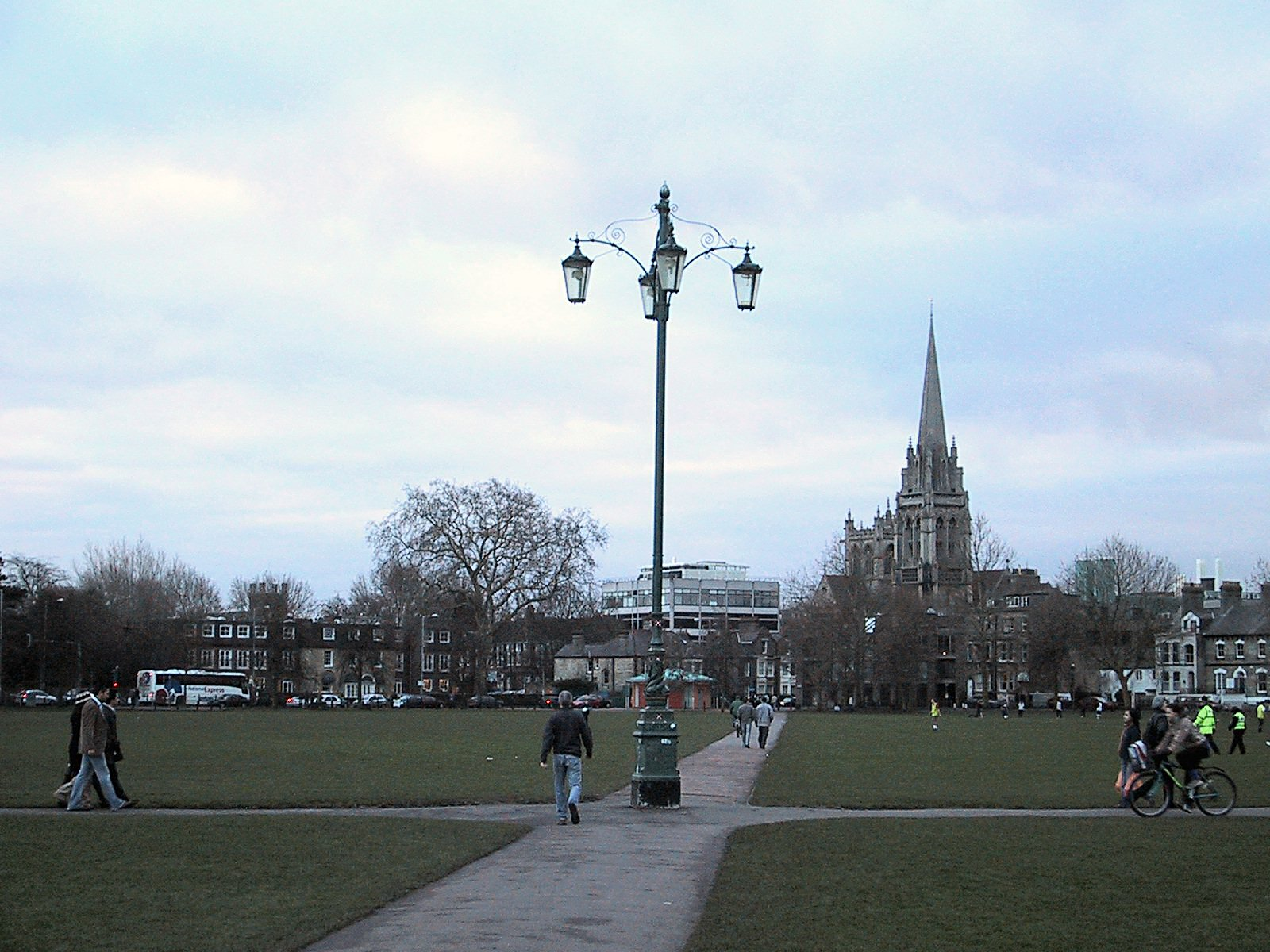

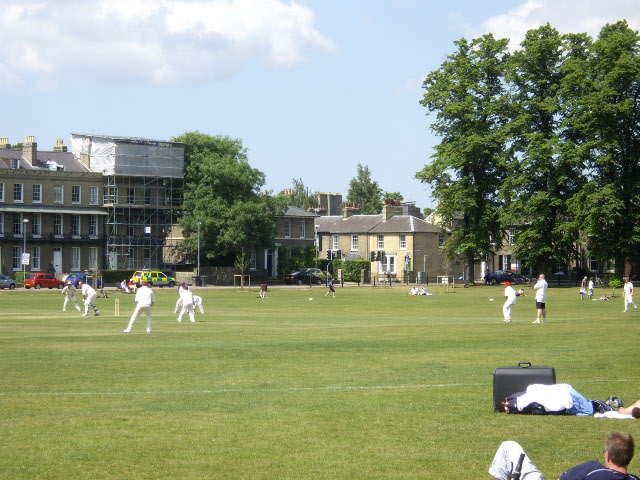

== See also ==
- Christ's Pieces
- Jesus Green
