= Reality Checkpoint =

Lamppost in Cambridge, UK

Coordinates: 52.202175°N 0.128179°E

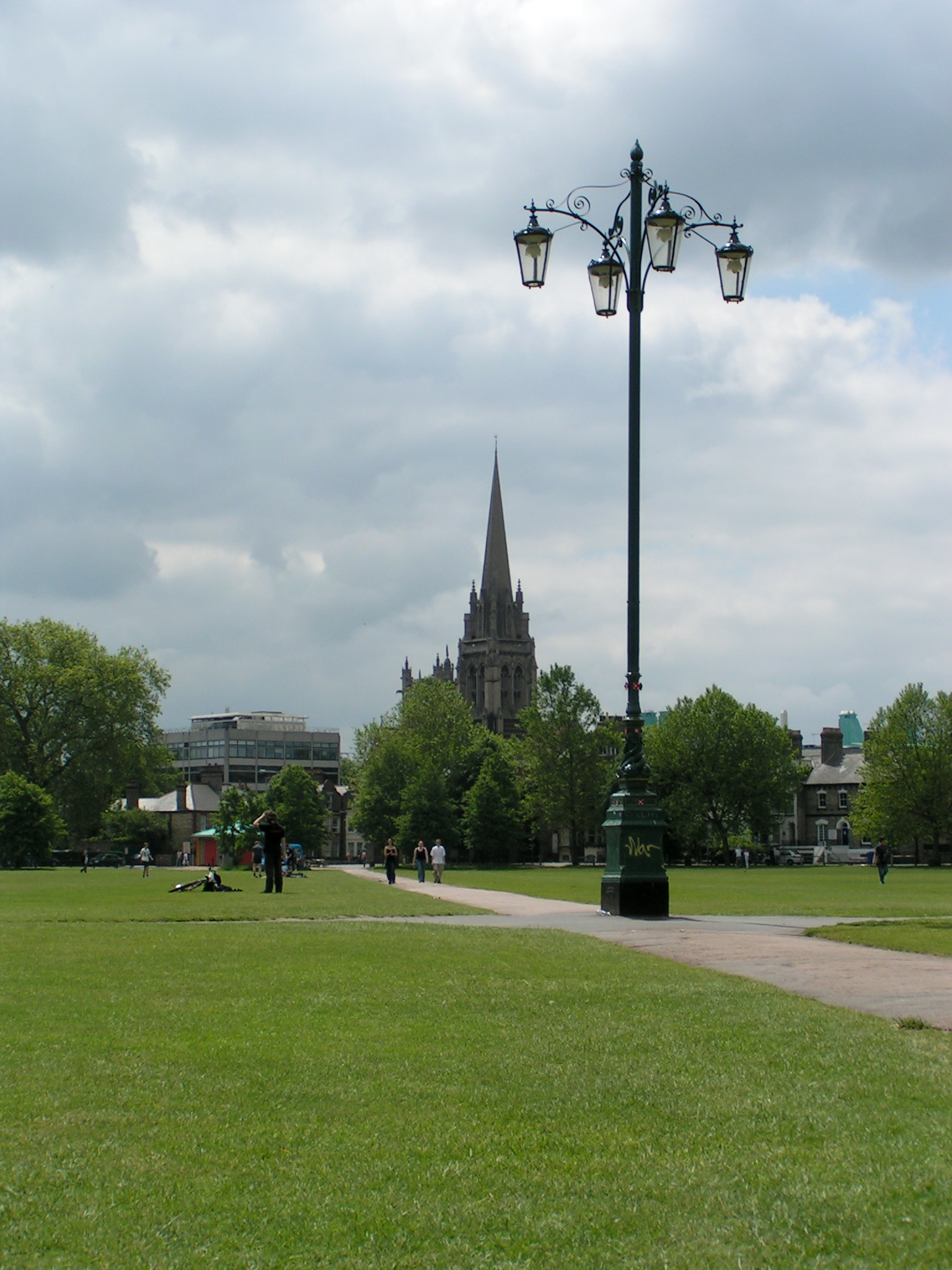
Reality Checkpoint

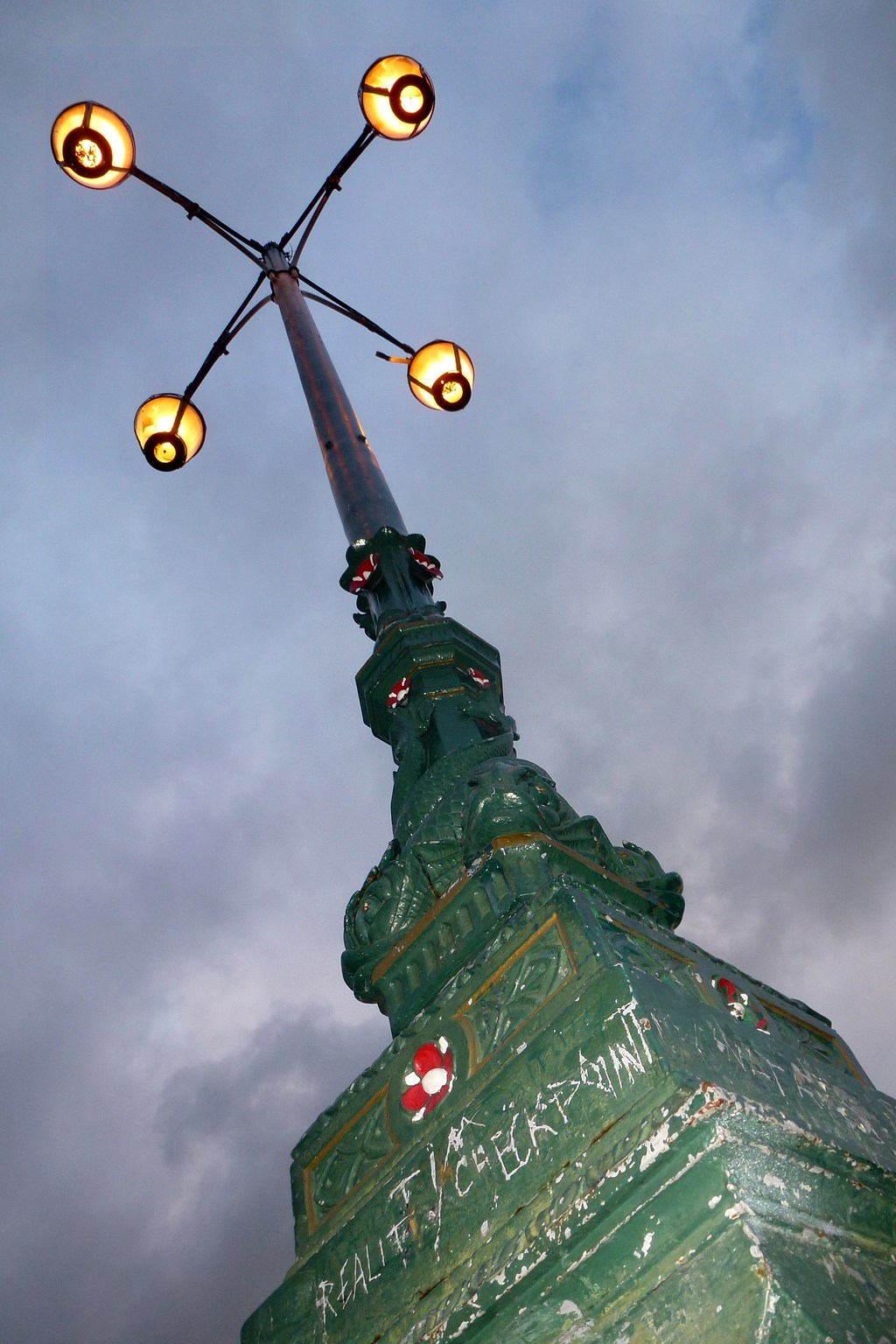
Detail of its base with graffiti in 2012

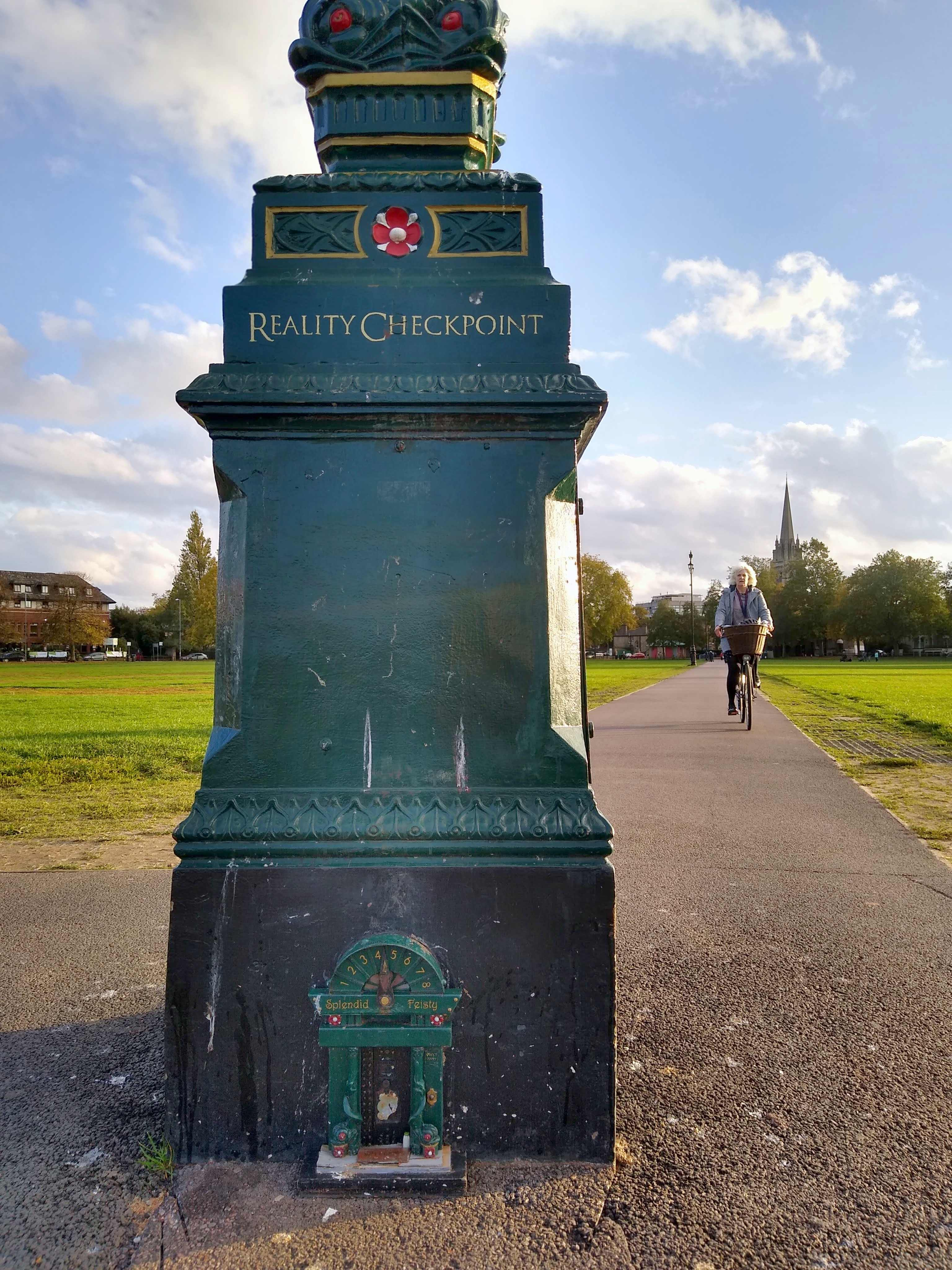
The inscription after its 2017 restoration and a Dinky Doors sculpture at its base

Reality Checkpoint is the humorous nickname of a large cast-iron lamppost in the middle of Parker's Piece, Cambridge, England, at the intersection of the park's diagonal paths. It gained the nickname in the early 1970s when it first appeared on the lamppost's base as graffiti, possibly by a student. The graffiti was sometimes removed by the local council, but soon reinstated. The nickname is now officially painted on.

== Origin of the name ==
There are three main theories as to the meaning of the name.

- It may mark the boundary between the central university area of Cambridge (referred to as the "reality bubble") and the "real world" of the townspeople living beyond it. One is warned to check one's notions of reality before passing.
- The name arose because the lamppost forms a useful landmark for people crossing the park at night – perhaps intoxicated or in the fog – since it is the only light for more than a hundred metres.
- When drunk, students and the general public are reminded to check that they are able to walk like a sober person before passing the police station at the edge of Parker's Piece, hence a "reality check".

== History ==
A lamp at the centre of Parker's Piece was first proposed in 1890 and work commenced in January 1894, when a pipe was laid from Parkside, running parallel with the path opposite Melbourne Place. Once the connections were completed, the pillar was erected. This attracted a great deal of interest and was described as a "very handsome ornament to the Piece". It was made of cast iron by the Sun Foundry of George Smith & Company in Glasgow. It stands on a square-section plinth with waterleaf decoration on the top edges. The base of the shaft of the circular section is encircled with four intertwined heraldic dolphins. The shaft carries four lampholders by means of scrolled wrought iron stays. It is said to be the oldest electrical lamppost in Cambridge.

A photograph from around 1903 shows the lamppost with a single lamp.

The post above the dolphins was torn down in 1945 by U.S. soldiers celebrating Victory over Japan Day, the end of the war with Japan. In September 1946 the lamppost was repaired by a local metalworks firm, George Lister & Sons. The work was done by foreman Sam Mason, assisted by a young apprentice, Tony Challis, who did the scrollwork at the top of the lamppost. Challis still lives in Cambridgeshire and is also responsible for the ornate railings found at Grantchester Meadows. The current design with four pendant lamps dates from 1946.

In 1996 the lamppost was designated as a Grade II listed building.

In 2016–17 Cambridge City Council restored the lamppost, reinstating its earlier colours of moss green, red, white and gold, and casting any new parts as required.

In 2018 anonymous local art installers, Dinky Doors, installed a reality checker "door" on the checkpoint, which was refurbished in 2019.

== Inscription ==
One report claims that the name was first painted on the lamppost in the early 1970s by students from Cambridgeshire College of Arts and Technology (now Anglia Ruskin University) under the guidance of one of their teachers. Another claims that it was originated in 1970 by the Emmanuel Liberation Front (ELF), one of whose members first scratched the name onto the lamppost. The ELF was a group of radical students at Emmanuel College between 1969 and 1971 influenced by the Situationists with their slogan "Do not adjust your mind. There is a fault in reality." Emmanuel adjoins the northwest side of Parker's Piece.

Until the early 1970s the lamppost was painted a dishwater grey or discoloured cream. In 2017 two brothers, David and Sandy Cairncross, revealed that they had been responsible for repainting it in bright colours in October 1973, a task undertaken with the written permission of Geoffrey Cresswell, the Cambridge City Engineer. At the time David was a student at King's College, Cambridge, and Sandy was a postgraduate research student (he is now a distinguished epidemiologist). The repainting did not involve anyone from Cambridgeshire College of Arts and Technology.

The Cairncrosses confirmed that the name "Reality Checkpoint" had previously been inscribed in marker pen on the pillar "a year or two earlier" and that their painting of the name was initially a placeholder for more sophisticated lettering. On how the lamppost got its name, David acknowledged the influence of Checkpoint Charlie during the Cold War and the popularity of Carlos Castaneda’s memoir A Separate Reality (1971).

The Cairncross brothers' repainting remained throughout the 1970s and into the 1980s. By 1980, however, the lamppost was looking shabby, as is clear in a photograph of the poet Tom Raworth taken next to it in 1980. Eventually Cambridge City Council painted over the decoration with a dull faux verdigris.

Since then the name has been informally inscribed or scratched into the paintwork many times, despite its repeated removal by Cambridge City Council or obliteration by graffiti. At one point in the mid-1990s, according to Graham Chainey writing in The London Magazine, "Reality Checkpoint" was scratched on one side of the plinth, while on the opposite side was scrawled "The Comfortably Numb", a reference to a song on the album The Wall by the Cambridge band Pink Floyd.

For the first half of 1998 the lamppost carried an unofficial plaque bearing its name, until it was removed by the council.

The comedian Ben Miller featured the lamppost in his BBC Two physics documentary "What Is One Degree?" for the science series Horizon. At that time the lamppost had the words "Reality Checkpoint" scratched into its paintwork in at least two places. The lamppost also features briefly in an episode of the crime drama Professor T., in which Miller plays the eponymous role.

The inscription was restored in June 2017 by the artist Emma Smith, with the approval of the Cambridge City Council, as part of the art project "Hunch" commissioned by the University Arms Hotel.
