= Reality Check (novel) =

Book by Peter Abrahams

- Author: Peter Abrahams
- Genre: Young adult fiction
- Published: 2009
- Publisher: HarperTeen
- Pages: 336
- Awards: Edgar Award for Best Young Adult (2010)
- ISBN: 978-0-061-22766-0
- Website: Reality Check

Reality Check is a 2009 young adult suspense novel written by Peter Abrahams. It was published on April 28, 2009, by HarperTeen (an imprint of HarperCollins). The book won the Edgar Award for Best Young Adult Novel in 2010.

The story follows Cody Laredo, the 16-year-old high school football star of a small town in Colorado, who is dating the beautiful and intellectual Clea Weston. Things begin to go wrong when Cody suffers a sports injury, putting his athletic future in jeopardy. Then, Clea's wealthy parents - against her relationship with Cody due to his poor grades and working-class background - send her away to a private boarding school in Vermont. Cody finds out from a newspaper headline that Clea has disappeared from her school in Vermont, and has been declared missing. With only a letter Clea sent him before her disappearance, Cody travels to Vermont to find her.
