= Peter Abrahams (American author) =

American crime fiction writer

- Born: June 28, 1947 (age 79); Boston, Massachusetts, U.S.
- Education: Williams College
- Occupation: Writer
- Children: 4, including Rosie
- Writing career
- Genre: Crime fiction
- Notable work: Reality Check
- Website: www.peterabrahams.com

Peter Abrahams (born June 28, 1947) is an American author of crime fiction for both adults and children.

His book Lights Out (1994) was nominated for an Edgar Award for best novel. Reality Check won the best young adult Edgar Award in 2011. Down the Rabbit Hole, first in the Echo Falls series, won the best children's/young adult Agatha Award in 2005. The Fan was adapted into a film starring Robert De Niro and directed by Tony Scott (1996).

His literary influences are Vladimir Nabokov, Graham Greene, and Ross Macdonald. Stephen King has referred to him as "my favorite American suspense novelist".

Born in Boston, Abrahams lives in Falmouth, Massachusetts, on Cape Cod. He is married and has four children including Rosie Gray. He graduated from Williams College in 1968.

== Bibliography ==
=== Echo Falls Mystery Series ===
Echo Falls Mysteries is a series for younger readers. There are three books in the series: Down the Rabbit Hole (2005), Behind the Curtain (2006), and Into the Dark (2008). They are based around teen super sleuth Ingrid Levin-Hill who, inspired by her role model Sherlock Holmes, solves mysteries throughout the series.

=== Chet and Bernie Mystery Series ===
Writing as Spencer Quinn, Abrahams is the author of the Chet and Bernie Mysteries. These stories are told from the point of view of Chet, Bernie Little's canine partner in the Little Detective Agency.

It was not initially known that Abrahams was Quinn. It took some work by journalists to determine who "Quinn" really is.

Chet had his own website, and is on Facebook.

Chet and Bernie Bibliography:

1. Dog On It (2009)
2. Thereby Hangs a Tail (2010)
3. To Fetch a Thief (2010)
4. The Dog Who Knew Too Much (2011)
5. A Fistful of Collars (2012)
6. A Cat Was Involved (2012 e-book)
7. The Sound And The Furry (2013)
8. The Iggy Chronicles, Volume One (2013 e-book)
9. Paw and Order (2014)
10. Tail of Vengeance (2014 e-book)
11. Scents and Sensibility (2015)
12. Santa 365 (2015 e-book)
13. Heart of Barkness (2019)
14. Of Mutts and Men (2020)
15. Tender Is The Bite (2021)
16. It's A Wonderful Woof (2021)
17. Bark to the Future (2022)
18. Up on the Woof Top (2023)
19. A Farewell to Arfs (2024)

All of the books have been released as Audiobooks read by Jim Frangione.

Abrahams has also begun a new amateur sleuth series featuring Mrs. Loretta Plansky, a 71-year-old retired widow in Florida.

1. Mrs. Plansky's Revenge (2023)
2. Mrs. Plansky Goes Rogue (2025)

=== Other ===
Also as Spencer Quinn:

- Ruff vs. Fluff (2019)
