= GURPS Uplift =

Science fiction role-playing game

- Cover art of 1st edition, 1990
- Designers: First edition; Stefan Jones; Second edition; Stefan Jones; Loyd Blankenship; David Brin; Steve Jackson; Kevin Lenagh; Chris McCubbin; Alberto Monteiro; Kenneth Peters; David L. Pulver
- Publishers: Steve Jackson Games
- Publication: 1st edition: 1990; 2nd edition: 2003
- Genres: Science fiction
- Systems: GURPS

GURPS Uplift is a sourcebook published by Steve Jackson Games (SJG) in 1990 that adapts David Brin's Uplift Trilogy setting to a science fiction role-playing game, using GURPS (Generic Universal Role-Playing System).

== Description ==
GURPS Uplift is based on the fictional universe envisioned by David Brin in his influential Uplift series of novels, where biological uplift of animals has become common. The book includes a preface by Brin, and a description of the Uplift universe, including the mechanics of Uplift, which involve Patron races bringing Client races to sapience. (In Brin's universe, the human race is unique, having achieved sapience without the aid of a Patron. Humans now have their own Client races, including neo-dolphins, neo-wolves, neo-gorillas and neo-chimpanzees.) These and twenty other alien races are described in detail.

Character creation allows player characters to be any of any Client or Patron race, using a pool of points to purchase abilities, skills and equipment, an occupation and a salary.

The last two chapters cover creating campaigns and adventures in the Uplift universe, and a description and maps of Jijo, the planet that is used as a setting.

Some information about the Uplift universe was included in this book that was not mentioned in Brin's novels, including gene stealers, Jopher, and E-space.

Cover art of 2nd edition by Alan Gutierrez, 2003

== Publication history ==
SJG first published the rules for GURPS in 1986, then immediately released a second edition in 1987, and a third edition in 1988. GURPS Uplift was a supplement for the third edition rules, a 128-page softcover book written by Stefan Jones and published in 1990 by SJG with artwork by Tom Baxa, Dan Frazier, and Shea Anton Pensa.

A revised and expanded second edition was created by Stefan Jones, Loyd Blankenship, David Brin, Steve Jackson, Kevin Lenagh, Chris McCubbin, Alberto Monteiro, Kenneth Peters, and David L. Pulver, and was published in 2003 as a 176-page softcover book with cover art by Alan Gutierrez.

A revised edition was reported to be in preparation in 2018.

== Reception ==
Writing for These Old Games, Phil Viverito liked the clear link between Brin's novels and the game rules, especially concerning the humans' Client races, writing, "Brin stuck to the basics of reality when coming up with these limitations and they are all well thought out in this book and the novels, even the fantastic ones. [Designer Stefan] Jones continues that in fine fashion." Viverito concluded by giving this book a rating of 5 out of 5, saying, "These approaches to games are great."

In Issue 46 of the French magazine Backstab, Pierre Rosenthal reviewed the 2003 edition, writing, "We never thought SJG would dare, and yet more than ten years later, here is a reissue of the only setting with astronaut dolphins!" However, Rosenthal thought this book would only be of interest to "fans of David Brin", and gave it a rating of 3 out of 5.

In Issue 19 of Arcane, Ian Pettingale noted the problem with basing a role-playing game on a line of popular books, pointing out "If you're playing GURPS Uplift with hardcore David Brin readers and you put a foot wrong, you'll find your judgements called into question. Or worse, some plot element you may have missed will surface and bring your entire scenario crashing down around your ears."
