= Hiapo =

Bottlenose dolphin, subject of animal language research

- Hiapo at the Kewalo Basin Marine Mammal Laboratory, Honolulu - Oahu (Hawaii)
- Species: Tursiops truncatus
- Born: c. November 13, 1983
- Died: February 25, 2004 (aged 20)
- Years active: c. November 13, 1983–February 25, 2004

Hiapo (c. November 13, 1983 – February 25, 2004) was a male Atlantic bottlenose dolphin, who along with a companion female dolphin named Elele, as well as tankmates Phoenix and Akeakamai, were the subjects of Louis Herman's animal language studies at the Kewalo Basin Marine Mammal Laboratory in Honolulu, Hawaii, USA. The most well known paper is the original work described in Herman, Richards, & Wolz (1984). Hiapo was also the subject of many other scientific studies of dolphin cognition and sensory abilities.

Physically identifying features of Hiapo included a five o'clock shadow on his throat, also sometimes described as the outline of a handsome dolphin tuxedo, a dorsal fin that drooped to the left, and a particularly large fluke and tail. In the Hawaiian language, Hiapo means first-born son.

== See also ==
- Animal Language
- Cetacean intelligence
- List of individual cetaceans
