= Akeakamai =

Bottlenose dolphin, subject of animal language research

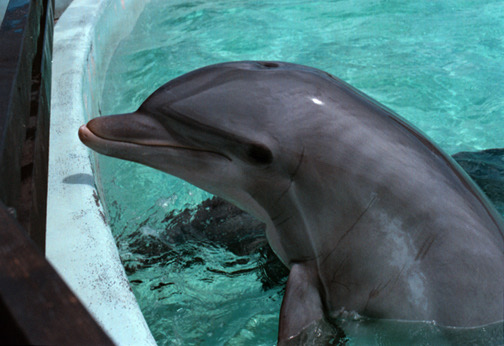
- Akeakamai, an Atlantic bottlenose dolphin
- Species: Tursiops truncatus
- Born: Captured 1976; Gulf of Mexico
- Died: November 12, 2003; Kewalo Basin Marine Mammal Lab
- Occupation: Research subject
- Years active: 1976 – November 12, 2003

Akeakamai (c. 1976 – November 12, 2003) (Nickname: Ake /æˈkeɪ/ ah-KAY) was a female Atlantic bottlenose dolphin, who, along with a companion female dolphin named Phoenix, and later tankmates Elele and Hiapo, were the subjects of Louis Herman's animal language studies at the Kewalo Basin Marine Mammal Laboratory in Honolulu, Hawaii. The most well-known paper is the original work described in Herman, Richards, & Wolz (1984). Akeakamai was also the subject of many other scientific studies of dolphin cognition, language acquisition, and sensory abilities.

Physically identifying features of Akeakamai included a straight eye line, a half-circle-shaped notch in the right side of her tail fluke, a small "Eiffel Tower"-shaped mark above her right eye, a thin notch in the side of her upper mouth, and a particularly wide melon. She also had characteristic in-air whistle calls, including an unusual high-low-high whistle that was well below typical signature whistle frequencies. In the Hawaiian language, Akeakamai means "philosopher" or "lover (ake) of wisdom (akamai)". Akeakamai was also the name given to an uplifted dolphin character in David Brin's science fiction novel Startide Rising.

Akeakamai was euthanized due to cancer on November 12, 2003.

== See also ==
- Animal language
- Cetacean intelligence
- List of individual cetaceans
- Startide Rising
