= Uplift (science fiction) =

Science fiction concept of transforming animals into more intelligent creatures

In science fiction, uplift is the intervention in the evolution of species of relatively low intelligence or even nonsapient species in order to increase their intelligence. This is usually accomplished by cultural, technological, or evolutionary interventions such as genetic engineering. The earliest appearance of the concept is in H. G. Wells's 1896 novel The Island of Doctor Moreau. The term was popularized by David Brin in his Uplift series in the 1980s.

== History ==
The concept of uplift can be traced to H. G. Wells's 1896 novel The Island of Doctor Moreau, in which the titular scientist transforms animals into horrifying parodies of humans through surgery and psychological torment. The resulting animal-people obsessively recite the Law, a series of prohibitions against a reversion to animal behaviors, with the haunting refrain of "Are we not men?". Wells's novel reflects Victorian concerns about vivisection and the power of unrestrained scientific experimentation to do terrible harm.

Other early literary examples can be found in the following works:

- Franz Kafka's A Report to an Academy (1917) is a short story in which Red Peter, an ape, describes his capture by humans, adaptation and mimicry of their behavior, habits and speech (originally in order to escape), and subsequent integration into human society.
- L. Sprague de Camp's "Johnny Black" stories (beginning with "The Command") about a black bear raised to human-level intelligence, published in Astounding Science-Fiction from 1938–1940.
- In Cordwainer Smith's Instrumentality of Mankind series "underpeople" are created from animals through unexplained technological means explicitly to be servants of humanity, and were often treated as less than slaves by the society that used them, until the laws were reformed in the story "The Ballad of Lost C'Mell" (1962). Smith's characterizations of underpeople are frequently quite sympathetic, and one of his most memorable characters is C'Mell, the cat-woman who appears in "The Ballad of Lost C'Mell" and in Norstrilia (1975).

David Brin has stated that his Uplift Universe was written at least in part in response to the common assumption in earlier science fiction such as Smith's work and Planet of the Apes that uplifted animals would, or even should, be treated as possessions rather than people. As a result, a significant part of the conflict in the series revolves around the differing policies of Galactics and humans toward their client races. Galactic races traditionally hold their uplifted "clients" in a hundred-millennium-long indenture, during which the "patrons" have extensive rights and claims over clients' lives and labor power.

In contrast, humans have given their uplifted dolphins and chimpanzees near-equal civil rights, with a few legal and economic disabilities related to their unfinished state. A key scene in Startide Rising is a discussion between a self-aware computer (the Niss) and a leading human (Gillian) about how the events during their venture (and hence the novel's plot) relate to the morality of the Galactics' system of uplift.

== Analysis ==
Some commentators, such as M. Keith Booker, have argued that some pieces of literature have used uplift as an allegory for the white man's burden and colonialism. Booker singles out Robert Silverberg's Downward to the Earth as a novel that mirrors Joseph Conrad's Heart of Darkness in a science-fiction setting. Other authors, by contrast, have used uplift as a narrative foil to colonialism, presenting uplift not only as benevolent but as a virtuous reversal of colonial attitudes.

== Selected works ==
Year	Series	Creator	Media type	Notes
1896	The Island of Doctor Moreau	H. G. Wells	Novel	
1963	Planet of the Apes	Pierre Boulle	Novel	The 1963 science fiction novel by French author Pierre Boulle was adapted into the 1968 film Planet of the Apes, launching the Planet of the Apes media franchise. The series also explores the opposite of uplift, the reduction of the human species to a regressed, atavistic, savage-like animal state.
1980–1998	Uplift Universe	David Brin	Novel series	Starting with Sundiver in 1980, Brin's six novels (and several short stories) making up the Uplift War and Uplift Storm pair of trilogies describe a universe dominated by a society built around a process of uplift, where full sapience is deemed virtually impossible without the intervention of another species through uplift.
2007	Race for the Galaxy	Thomas Lehmann	Board game	Uplift is a major theme. Some cards have "UPLIFT" highlighted in the title and can help score points and achieve goals. Designer Tom Lehmann attributes the inspiration for uplift to David Brin's Uplift series.
2007–2017	Mass Effect	BioWare	Video game series	Before the events of the first game, the Salarians, a hyper-intelligent but physically weak alien race, uplifted the Krogan, a combative and rapidly-reproducing race, in order to defeat the Rachni, a hive-minded species, in an interstellar conflict. When the Rachni were defeated, the Krogan experienced a massive population boom and found themselves in conflict with other species in the galaxy. In response, the Salarians launched a biological weapon called the Genophage against them which only made 1 in 1,000 pregnancies viable, with the rest being stillbirths. The ethical ramifications of the uplift and bioweapon are used as plotlines throughout the series.
2015–2022	Children of Time	Adrian Tchaikovsky	Series of novels	Three novels (also including Children of Ruin and Children of Memory) explore how various earth animal species evolve and develop civilizations on terraformed exoplanets when uplifted by a human-developed nanovirus originally intended for monkeys. Children of Time focuses on spiders, Children of Ruin octopuses, and Children of Memory corvids, though the novels have connected narratives and also portray interactions between these uplifted species and spacefaring humans.

- Flowers for Algernon, a laboratory mouse, and a human uplifted
- Heart of a Dog – 1925 satirical novel by Mikhail Bulgakov

== See also ==
- Animal cognition
- Eugenics – Effort to improve purported human genetic quality
- Intelligence amplification – Use of information technology to augment human intelligence
- Talking animal – Non-human animal that can make human-like sounds
- Transhumanism – Philosophical movement
- Ancient astronauts, the pseudoscientific belief that human beings have been uplifted
