= The Uplift War =

1987 science fiction novel by David Brin

- Cover of first edition (hardcover)
- Author: David Brin
- Language: English
- Series: Uplift Universe
- Genre: Science fiction
- Publisher: Bantam Spectra
- Publication date: 1987
- Publication place: United States
- Media type: Print (hardback & paperback)
- Pages: 506
- Award: Locus Award for Best Science Fiction Novel (1988)
- ISBN: 0-932096-44-1
- OCLC: 15730601
- Preceded by: Startide Rising
- Followed by: Brightness Reef

The Uplift War is a 1987 science fiction novel by American writer David Brin, the third book of six set in his Uplift Universe. It was nominated as the best novel for the 1987 Nebula Award and won the 1988 Hugo and Locus Awards. The previous two books are Sundiver and Startide Rising.

== Plot summary ==
50,000 years before the events of the novel, the planet Garth was leased to the Bururalli who, imperfectly uplifted, reverted to a pre-sentient state and nearly destroyed its ecosystem by overhunting all large indigenous species. The ecologically sensitive galactic civilization declared a war of extermination and the Bururalli were made extinct. As the youngest clan in galactic civilization, Earthclan is mostly relegated to near-hopeless "recovery worlds" for colonization, and they are granted a lease to inhabit Garth.

The novel begins in the year 2489 C.E. with the avian Gubru planning to invade Garth. The Gubru, a conservative and somewhat humorless alien race, decide to hold Garth hostage in an attempt to learn more about the discovery that the dolphin spaceship Streaker made in Startide Rising about the Progenitors.

The Gubru overpower Garth's token space forces, in the battle a neo-chimp soldier of Earthclan, Fiben Bolger, pilots a small craft that is damaged and crash lands in the mountains. The Gubru engage a small portion of their ground force in ritualistic combat against Earthling forces, and Earthclan successfully defends its legal right to the planet under the standards of Galactic law. However, the Gubru immediately take hostage most of the human population using a pre-planned subterfuge consisting of repeated, wide aerial distribution of a poisonous gas specially formulated to target humans. In order to receive the antidote, the humans must report to island prison camps and agree to be imprisoned during the occupation. The Gubru, used to galactic norms, mistakenly believe that the neo-chimp population on Garth will be easily controlled without their human patrons to guide them.

Taking advantage of resentments that fester among the lower social strata of the neo-chimp population (those with limited rights to breed), the Gubru subvert some of the neo-chimps in and around Port Helenia, the capital city. At the same time, a large group in the mountains, led by Robert Oneagle and Athaclena, engage in guerrilla warfare. Their combination of "wolfling" ingenuity and galactic diplomacy allow them to inflict significant damage, both psychological and physical, on the Gubru. Fiben Bolger, in town on a fact-finding expedition for the Resistance, runs afoul of one of the conspirator neo-chimpanzees known as Irongrip.

Elsewhere on the planet, Athaclena's father Uthacalthing, the Tymbrimi ambassador, and the Thennanin ambassador, Kault, are shot down while fleeing the Gubru invasion. The two ambassadors land safely, but must trek several hundred kilometers back to civilization. The Tymbrimi are allies of Earth and well known for a low sense of humor that, along with a yen for surprise, motivates much of their behavior. By contrast, the Thennanin are portrayed as dour, supercilious, protectors of the rights of animals and species. Hoping to fool Kault with an elaborate and ultimately costly practical joke, Uthacalthing secretly instructs a furtive neo-chimp to create false evidence pointing to the existence of Garthlings – a fabled race of pre-sentient creatures that were rumored to have survived the Bururalli holocaust. Uthacalthing also plants evidence about the Garthlings in his "diplomatic cache" – which is, after being disturbed by Fiben Bolger, stolen by the Gubru. Unknown to him, some renegade humans have already been illegally beginning the uplift process of gorillas, meaning that there actually is a 'Garthling' race up for adoption.

The three Gubru co-commanders (suzerains) overreact to most situations. When the Suzerain of Cost and Caution is killed in an accident set up by the neo-chim resistance movement, the other two suzerains exploit the situation and further their own goals. The Suzerain of Propriety seizes on the Garthling myth and builds an enormously expensive hypershunt on Garth. If Garthlings can be found, the Gubru will be able to use the hypershunt to adopt and indenture the race for 100,000 years in exchange for uplifting them to sentience. At the same time, the Gubru and others find evidence of secret uplift in the mountains, and come to believe that Earthclan was hiding a secret effort to uplift Garthlings.

The suzerains are unable to resolve their internal power struggles and begin scheming against one another. Fiben Bolger begins to fear that Earthclan's well-known naivete at Galactic punctilio could imperil the entire neo-chimpanzee population, both on Garth and on Earth. Some of the key neo-chimpanzee characters are eventually forced to choose between following the legal representatives of the surviving Planetary Government, or to follow their original leaders, Robert Oneagle and the young Tymbrimi Athaclena. Many of the major characters must weigh their personal feelings against patriotic duties and greater responsibilities. There is a trial by combat during the Uplift ceremony between Fiben Bolger and Irongrip for the right to choose patrons for their next stage of Uplift, as the Gubru attempt to co-opt the uplift of the neochimpanzees in order to salvage the massive expense of building the hypershunt. In the end, Uthacalthing's joke succeeds beyond his wildest imaginings, as the partially uplifted gorillas suddenly come forward as Garthlings and indicate their willingness to be uplifted by the Thennanin, with Humans and Neo-Chimpanzees as their consorts (races tasked to ensure that uplift is not mishandled or abused). Athaclena and the remaining resistance fighters come down from the mountains and deliberately assemble in an exposed position, showing their willingness to die rather than allow further acts of war to damage Garth's already damaged ecosystems. The Suzerain of Beam and Talon orders his soldiers to destroy them, but they disobey and kill him, and the Gubru leave Garth in shame. As the book comes to an end, Uthacalthing's maneuverings have brought desperately needed assistance to Earthclan and its allies out on the starlanes, as the Thennanin and their allies join the conflict on Earthclan's side.

== Characters ==
- Humans
  - Robert Oneagle - Playboy son of the Planetary Coordinator, who enters into a complicated interspecies relationship with the Tymbrimi teenager Athaclena as well as being one of two free humans left alive and uncaptured on the surface of Garth. He undergoes a tremendous physical and mental change over the course of the book as the invasion occurs and he becomes almost the last free human on Garth.
  - Megan Oneagle - Planetary coordinator of Garth, who finds herself powerless in an undersea redoubt after the Gubru arrive, with all plans for organized resistance foiled by the Gubru's gas attack.
  - Major Prathachulthorn - Professional soldier who assumes command on reaching the Mulun mountains resistance enclave, but causes problems with his hatred of all non-Earth intelligent species, and condescending attitude towards chimps.
  - Lydia McCue - Prathachulthorn's second-in-command.
- Neo-Chimpanzees
  - Fiben Bolger - A chimp with the commission in the planetary militia. Friend of Robert Oneagle. Plays a large role in the resistance effort.
  - Sylvie - Female chimp who initially collaborates with the invaders.
  - Gailet Jones - Female chimp, graduate student at the planetary university. Leads a branch of the resistance after invasion.
  - Max - Member of the Resistance, a chen, and former servant to Gailet Jones
  - Irongrip - a probie (probationary) chen outcast
- Galactics
  - Athaclena - Tymbrimi. Uthacalthing's daughter. Engaged in a consort (contract) with Robert Oneagle.
  - Uthacalthing - Tymbrimi. The tymbrimi are humanoid in shape and partially in anatomy. They have two features that make them distinct among the Galactics: their adaptation hormones and their corona. The corona is a set of tentacular threads emitting from the head upward, it is a probability organ fitted to construct emotional glyphs that convey a specific emotion. These glyphs then can take on a mind of their own, in a sense, as certain ones are used for everything from scouting other creatures in the dark to trying to implant a thought in someone else's mind. The adaptation hormones are a special ability they have; under physical stress, the body releases a flood of hormones to the parts of the body, causing the stress and alters them. It can make skin thicker, nails harder and longer, widen the nostrils for better air intake, change the placements of nerve endings and body part placements, etc. Also, the tymbrimi feature a rather unusual quality among galactics; they are tricksters. They play practical jokes on each other as a part of their civilization, and have an extraordinary sense of humor, much like humans but 100-fold stronger.
  - Kault - Thennanin ambassador to Garth. Kault finds himself on an epic walking journey with Uthacathling, who is frustrated by the Thannanin's near immunity to psi and Tymbrini glyphs.
  - Gubru - A race of avian (birdlike) creatures governed by the Triumvirate, three selected officials representing the army, church, and economy of their race. The Triumvirate are all un-sexed until they reach the mating consensus, meaning that all three officials need to reach complete agreement on all three subjects before one of them is able to become a female or queen (highest in status).
  - Kwackoo - Another avian race, clients of the Gubru. They mainly serve in support roles for the Suzerains, to whom they are fiercely loyal.

== Translations ==
- Chinese: 提升之战, 2008
- Bulgarian: "Войната на Ъплифта" ("The War of the Uplift"), 1996, 2004
- Russian: "Война за возвышение" ("The War for Uplift"), 1995, 1998, 2002.
- German: "Entwicklungskrieg", 1990
- Polish: "Wojna wspomaganych" ("The war of Uplifted"), 1994
- Romanian: "Războiul elitelor" ("The war of the Elites"), 1998
- Spanish: "La rebelión de los pupilos" ("The rebellion of the pupils"), 1988
- Italian: "I Signori di Garth" ("Lords of Garth"), 1988
- French: "Élévation" ("Uplift")
- Lithuanian: "Išaukštinimo karas" 1996
- Hebrew "מלחמת הרימום" (The Uplift War) Published 1999
- Japanese: "知性化戦争" ("Intellectualization War"), 1990

== Reception ==
The book received a number of reviews, including:

- by Dan Chow (1987) in Locus, #315 April 1987
- by Michael M. Levy (1987) in Fantasy Review, July–August 1987
- by Don D'Ammassa (1987) in Science Fiction Chronicle, #96 September 1987
- by Thomas A. Easton [as Tom Easton] (1987) in Analog Science Fiction/Science Fact, November 1987
- by Baird Searles (1987) in Isaac Asimov's Science Fiction Magazine, Mid-December 1987
- by Eugene Lin (1987) in Thrust, #28, Fall 1987
- [in French] by Jonathan Dornet (1989) in A&A, #121
- [in French] by André-François Ruaud (1989) in Yellow Submarine, #62
- [in French] by André-François Ruaud (1989) in Fiction, #410
- by John D. Owen (1996) in Vector 188
- by Darrell Bain (2005) in My 100 Most Readable (and Re-Readable) Science Fiction Novels
- [in French] by Marie Surgers (2007) in Galaxies, #42
- [in German] by Christian Hoffmann (2015) in Das Science Fiction Jahr 2015
