= Children of Time (novel) =

2015 science fiction novel by Adrian Tchaikovsky

- First edition
- Author: Adrian Tchaikovsky
- Language: English
- Genre: Science fiction
- Publisher: Tor UK
- Publication date: 2015 (hardcover)
- Publication place: UK
- Media type: Print (hardcover and paperback)
- Pages: 600
- ISBN: 978-1-4472-7328-8
- Followed by: Children of Ruin

Children of Time, published on June 4, 2015, is a science fiction novel by author Adrian Tchaikovsky. The novel has two plot strands, one of which follows the evolution of a civilization of genetically modified Portia labiata (arachnid) on a terraformed exoplanet, guided by an artificial intelligence based on the personality of one of the human terraformers of the planet. The second plot strand follows the journey of an interstellar ark ship containing cryonically preserved humans as they seek a new planetary home following a planetwide environmental collapse on Earth.

The novel received positive reviews, and won the 2016 Arthur C. Clarke Award for best science fiction novel. The director of the award program praised the novel as having "universal scale and sense of wonder reminiscent of Clarke himself."

The next in the series, Children of Ruin, was published on May 14, 2019. The third book, Children of Memory, was published on November 24, 2022. The fourth and latest book, Children of Strife, was published on March 13, 2026. In 2023, the series was awarded (Note: Tchaikovsky has since disavowed the win due to the subsequent ballot controversy.) the Hugo Award for Best Series.

== Plot ==
The narration switches between the perspectives of the inhabitants of Gilgamesh and Kern's planet.

=== 1. Genesis ===
In the far future, Dr. Avrana Kern is the head of a science team orbiting a terraformed exoplanet. The team is preparing to release a genetically designed nanovirus onto the new world to accelerate the evolution of a group of monkeys which is being released simultaneously.

The operation to evolve monkeys is sabotaged by a member of an anti-technology faction; the facility is destroyed and the monkeys are killed. The nanovirus infects other species, notably jumping spiders. Kern escapes, but is left stranded in orbit, hoping for a rescue mission and periodically going into stasis. Meanwhile a war breaks out on Earth, killing almost all of humanity.

=== 2. Pilgrimage ===
Many millennia pass, and civilization re-emerges on Earth. Faced with the slow collapse of Earth's biosphere, the remnants of humanity build an ark ship Gilgamesh, put 500,000 people into stasis in cargo and try to find themselves a planet.

On Gilgamesh, Holsten Mason, its classicist (chief specialist in 'the Old Empire') is woken from stasis by Isa Lain, the chief engineer, who accidentally received Kern's distress signal and a set of mathematical problems directed at the planet. Kern's World looks ideal for colonisation. Mason sends Kern the answers, but she hacks Gilgamesh and gives the crew coordinates for another planet.

Uplifted spiders evolve; they hunt together, then build cities and domesticate ants. Portia, a spider from the Great Nest city, uses diplomacy and tools to gather information from a smaller settlement. Later, Portia steals from ants a crystal that vibrates due to Kern's transmissions.

=== 3. War ===
Mason is woken from stasis by mutineers. The chief, Vrie Guyen, has proposed an almost uninhabitable moon colony as a back up to the Gilgamesh. Several mutineers attempt to go to Kern's World. The crew fight them, and the mutineers escape to the spider planet, but are immediately attacked by ants. Karst, the head of security on Gilgamesh, sends a shuttle to pick up hostages, but kills all the mutineers except for one woman who escapes and is caught by spiders.

Spiders create a religion centred around the Messenger (Kern) whose transmissions they receive using crystals. Ants destroy spider cities; a spider from Great Nest named Portia witnesses the conquest of Seven Trees. She tries to get help from Bianca, a scientist, who helps Portia to tame the ants.

=== 4. Enlightenment ===
The ship approaches an uninhabitable planet with a terraforming station nearby. The crew take ancient technology from the station, repair and improve Gilgamesh.

Great Nest is struck by a deadly infectious disease. Bianca, a former priestess, makes a battery and wants to use it to talk to the Messenger. She and others produce a serum against the plague. Bianca gains a permission to send a signal to Messenger. Kern wakes up from her sleep and responds.

=== 5. Schism ===
Guyen wakes up many people who see him as a god. He uploads parts of his consiousness to the ship. The crew learn that all of the moon colonists had died.

Spiders learn to understand Kern who instructs them to fight for resources. Portia's brilliant assistant, Fabian, invents a novel way to condition the ants, and tries to gain some rights for male spiders, oppressed by females. Unable to reach his goal, Fabian sneaks into the cell of exiled astronomer Bianca and escape with her to Seven Trees where males are more respected. Great Nest starts a war against Seven Trees that Fabian wins with his ants, but not before forcing the rulers to accept his demands.

=== 6. Zenith / Nadir ===
Spiders show Kern that her 'monkeys' are in fact spiders. Portia and Fabian launch the first satellite.

Mason is woken up by Gilgamesh-born humans: his stasis chamber is breaking down, like the ship itself. Aged Lain shows him a storage with frozen embryos, including their future child. Gilgamesh is headed to Kern's World.

=== 7. Collision ===
The crew of Gilgamesh prepare for a fight. Spiders tell them to go back, but humans think that spiders cannot be sentient. Mason and recently awoken, enfeebled Lain watch as the spiders board the ship and overpower the humans, shooting them with glass darts.

Despite Kern's advice to kill the humans, the spiders use the information about the stranded mutineer and develop another nanovirus that makes humans and spiders feel empathy towards each other. Gilgamesh lands; the humans walk out. Mason carries Lain on the grass where she dies of old age, peacefully.

=== 8. Diaspora ===
The spiders and humans mix together and combine their knowledge. Voyager, an exploration space ship, is moving towards the old Earth that started transmitting again, with Helena Holsten Lain, Mason and Lain's great-great-granddaughter, on board.

== Characters ==
=== Old Empire ===
==== Dr. Avrana Kern ====
The Old Empire's only known survivor; a cynical, egotistic woman aiming to "beget new sentient life" in the image of humanity. She survives the destruction of her ship and spends millennia in suspended animation inside an observation satellite, orbiting the only world she was able to seed with the gene-editing nanovirus while it works wonders on the animal population below. Unstrung by millennia of isolation and mechanical and biological degradation, she xenophobically denies the humanity of the crew of the starship Gilgamesh and what they assume to be their main threat until the starship returns to her world centuries later.

=== Gilgamesh ===
==== Commander Vrie Guyen ====
The leader of the Gilgamesh, Guyen often exercises autocratic authority over the expedition and its sleeping human cargo. Guyen leads the ark ship to another terraformed world after Kern forces his hand and discovers experimental Old Empire technology capable of uploading a human mind to a sufficiently complex computer. He eventually devotes himself to a new quixotic purpose: uploading his mind to the Gilgamesh computer, as a means of establishing firmer control over the ship itself before returning to Kern's World.

==== Holsten Mason ====
Chief classicist of the starship Gilgamesh, he is charged with translating a prominent Old Empire language—“Imperial C”. Holsten's primary responsibility is to help the ark ship navigate the unknown territories and technologies of the Old Empire. However, he eventually embraces a higher mission: establishing a new cultural heritage for humanity based upon the historical narrative through which he lived while aboard the Gilgamesh.

==== Isa Lain ====
The Gilgamesh chief engineer and its eventual de facto leader, Lain is frequently forced to hold the ark ship together in the face of near-insurmountable mechanical breakdown. Sacrificing decades of her life guiding and preserving “the tribe”—primarily descendants of engineering; initially, Lain's anti-Guyen faction—and the vessel itself, she becomes the spiritual leader of Gilgamesh's ship-born generations.

==== Renas Vitas ====
The chief science officer of the Gilgamesh and a staunch adherent of professional objectivity, Vitas is more than capable of notable research. However, her ambitious scientific curiosity, deference to precedent, and, ultimately, personal insecurity frequently lead her astray. Holsten sees her as almost robotic and uncannily ageless.

==== Karst ====
The Gilgamesh chief of security. Though flamboyantly blunt, Karst demonstrates himself as a cautious leader by restricting weapons access during the ark ship's internal conflicts. Initially intimidated by the gruff gunslinger, by the end of the novel, Holsten eventually comes to respect Karst, who appears to have a heroic, albeit vulnerable, quality.

=== Spiders ===
The novel spans thousands of years and multiple generations of Portiid spiders. The spiders each have their own identities, lives, and experiences, on top of their genetic memories called "Understandings," although the narrative refers to its main and supporting characters by four different names based on distinct personalities or historical archetypes.

==== Portia ====
Female spider; warrior, priestess, leader. Usually the main viewpoint female.

==== Bianca ====
Female spider; warrior, scientist, leader, genius. Main supporting female.

==== Fabian ====
Male spider; scientist, rebel, genius, leader. Main supporting male, becomes the main viewpoint for the spiders' seventh story.

==== Viola ====
Female spider; scientist, leader. Another main viewpoint female.

== Film adaptation ==
In July 2017, the rights were optioned for a potential film adaptation.
