= Uplift Universe =

Science fiction novel series by David Brin

The Uplift Universe is a fictional universe created by American science fiction writer David Brin. A central feature in this universe is the process of biological uplift.

His books which take place in this universe are:

- Sundiver (1980)
- Startide Rising (1983)
- The Uplift War (1987)
- The Uplift Storm trilogy (sometimes called the Uplift Trilogy):
  - Brightness Reef (1995)
  - Infinity's Shore (1996)
  - Heaven's Reach (1998)

There is also a short story, "Aficionado" (originally titled "Life in the Extreme"), published in 1998, which serves as a prequel to the series as a whole (it also serves as a part of Existence, an unrelated work by Brin), and a novella, Temptation, published in 1999 in Far Horizons, which follows on from Heaven's Reach. He also wrote Contacting Aliens: An Illustrated Guide to David Brin's Uplift Universe, a guidebook about the background of the series.

At least one more Uplift book is planned by Brin, as he has stated in 2012 that Temptation "will be a core element of the next Uplift novel... and answers several unresolved riddles left over from Heaven's Reach."

GURPS Uplift is a sourcebook for a science fiction themed role-playing game based on the Uplift Universe. It includes a few stories that happen in Jijo after the end of Heaven's Reach.

== Setting ==
In the Uplift universe an intergalactic civilization called the Five Galaxies, comprising a multitude of sapient races, has existed for billions of years. This civilization is perpetuated by the act of "uplift", in which a "patron" species genetically modifies a pre-sapient "client" species until it is sapient. The client species is typically indentured to its patron species for 100,000 years. A patron species gains considerable status, and patrons and clients often unite into powerful clans. Patron status can be lost due to extermination, or gross crimes against the galactic civilization. Brin helped popularise the term 'Uplift' within the context of science fiction which has since been used by academics writing in the field generally for the concept.

It is generally accepted in this universe that the process of uplift was initiated over two billion years ago by a species known only as the Progenitors. Humanity is therefore an anomaly – a species with no apparent patron race. Whether humanity truly evolved independently, or whether it was criminally abandoned by an unknown patron early in its uplift, is a topic of fierce debate. Most of humanity believes itself to be a "wolfling" species that emerged into sapience solely through natural evolution, without genetic manipulation by a patron species. This belief is considered heresy and ridiculous by most of the galactic civilization and has made most of the galactic powers enemies of EarthClan. The fact that humanity had already uplifted two species (chimpanzees and bottlenose dolphins) when it encountered the galactic civilization gave humanity patron status, which is one of the few lucky turns it has had in its difficult position as pariah in the galactic civilization. This saved humanity from the likely fate of becoming client to another race through forced adoption or being punitively exterminated for the environmental damage done to the Earth and its native species. Philosophically, it has been noted Brin sees lower life forms with potential for uplift like children, that will grow into adults.

Humanity and its clients are collectively known as EarthClan, with a government known as the Terragens Council. Hierarchy exists within the different sentient species on earth, though they are all cooperative. Humanity in the Uplift universe is not a dominant nor a technologically advanced species – it is centuries, even millennia, behind the great galactic powers and has several enemies capable of exterminating it entirely. While there is cooperation between humans and different alien races, there is also cooperation between humans and their "client" (uplifted animal) races, to the point that they cooperatively crew spaceships.

The civilization of the Five Galaxies has several "Institutes", which are bureaucracies that specify how species deal with each other and the uplift process. One of the most significant of these is the Library Institute, the repository of all knowledge. Humanity prides itself on using the Library as little as possible. For instance, instead of drawing upon the highly refined starship designs available in the Library, humanity tends to develop its own (generally vastly inferior) vessels. Humans feel that this is a way to exercise their own independence and creativity, and it occasionally allows them to find solutions to problems which have in fact surprised more powerful races.

The Institute of Migration determines what planets can be colonized and under what environmental restrictions, primarily to ensure that suitable races can still evolve for later uplift. The institute also ensures the separation of the hydrogen-breathing and oxygen-breathing orders of sapient life. Other intergalactic institutes regulate the uplift of sapient species, navigation, warfare, etc. Bureaucrats are recruited from all races but are expected to put the interests of their bureau before that of their race and maintain strict neutrality; however, this does not always happen.

The civilization of the Five Galaxies is made up solely of oxygen-breathing species. This civilization is aware of, but by tradition rarely if ever interacts with, the other orders of sapient life, which include those which are hydrogen-breathing, transcendent, mechanical, memetic, and quantum. There is also a special designation for hypothetical orders of life which could also exist but have not been discovered.

=== Technology ===
Unlike most other races, humans and their clients regard creativity as very desirable – the others take the view that everything useful has already been discovered, so it would be more efficient to search the Galactic Library for whatever they need. EarthClan are also considered odd for using archaic technology in addition to the more advanced Galactic technology, or sometimes preferring primitive technologies that they understand to more advanced ones that they don't yet understand. Most notably, EarthClan utilizes calculus, which is unknown and mistrusted by galactic society. All other races simply apply brute-force, finite-element analysis to any problem due to their ability to apply as much computing power as may be needed to model all phenomena.

=== Social behavior ===
Most Galactic "clans" are rather feudal and sometimes exploitative, and place strong emphasis on etiquette and especially on deferential behavior by members of "subordinate" races towards members of "superior" races. Hence they often regard EarthClan's informal speech as insulting and the humans' egalitarian treatment of their Neo-Chimp and Neo-Dolphin clients as foolish, if not outright offensive.

=== Languages ===
In the uplift world, the uplifted clients speak Anglic, a uniform language that replaced all previous human languages, and all EarthClan schools also teach GalSeven, a widely used galactic language. Dolphins are portrayed as adept with languages, and have two of their own: Trinary, a whistling language in which they speak in haiku, and Primal Dolphin, the "dream language", which is a song-like language they can use to communicate with each other and with whales. Uplifted animals can lose their ability to speak when stressed, as a temporary de-evolution

Galactics have several specialized languages, including mathematical, tonal, sonar-based and "bridging" languages. Some languages are more sophisticated than others: in one novel, an alien called Alvin, who is a “Hoon” (alien species), notes that only some languages are good enough to describe highly technical processes, and notes how some people switch to "Galseven" or "Galtwo", which he does not understand. Chimps' vocal chords have been modified so that they can articulate human speech.

== EarthClan ==
EarthClan is the name of humanity and their clients (an animal or plant species being uplifted) in David Brin's Uplift Universe. They are named for their combined homeworld Earth.

In the books, humanity is an insignificant race, having no known Patrons (a species responsible for uplifting them) and having mostly primitive technology. Humans have two (confirmed) clients and are referred to formally as "a-Human ul-Chimpanzee ul-Dolphin". By becoming patrons before contact with Galactic society, humanity unknowingly avoided forcibly becoming a client of an older race.

=== Humans ===
Humans in the Uplift universe have generally not undergone serious genetic manipulation, though there has been a concerted effort to mix all human ethnicities and breed superior humans. Advanced augmentative technologies exist, but are not widely used by humans. Humans themselves are "patrons" to other species that they uplift.

=== Neo-Chimpanzees ===
Chimpanzees were the first clients of humans and are the most "complete" in that they are closest to full sapiency. Initially, chimpanzees are removed from their families and raised in human environments, where they are uplifted, and given language abilities. They are Stage 2 clients but almost became Stage 3 when the Gubru invaded Garth. Neo-Chimpanzees like music, specifically percussion. They are embarrassed by situations which remind them of their earlier status as "smart animals", especially about nudity, tree-climbing and above all losing their ability to speak when under stress. Both dolphins and chimpanzees lose some of their sentient abilities in certain situations, a theme of devolution in Brin's work.

=== Neo-Dolphins ===
Dolphins were the second clients of humans, and are some of the best pilots in the Five Galaxies because their aquatic origins give them excellent instincts for 3-D maneuvers. They are also important in planetary warfare because most Galactics are unaware of the strategic potential of the sea. Neo-Dolphins are Stage-2 Clients, and recently got their own starship, Streaker (Streaker's discoveries later caused controversy among the oxygen-breathing sapient species). Neo-Dolphins are at a relatively early stage of uplift, and this has several consequences which are important in the plots of the stories: the optimal genetic mix for Neo-Dolphins has not yet been determined, and some of the newer genetic mixes become dangerous to colleagues when under stress; there are significant differences between older and younger Neo-Dolphins, in particular older individuals find it more difficult to speak; and they have to struggle against tendencies to slip into atavistic behaviours such as the "Whale Dream" and rescue fever (which leads them to beach themselves). Dolphins and humans interact with a version of English called Anglic.

=== Neo-Gorillas ===
Humans had agreed not to uplift Gorillas until their other clients were further along the path of Uplift. However, some humans secretly continued the project on the small colony-world of Garth. Neo-Gorillas have some understanding that they are being uplifted, and chose the Thennanin as their "patrons" at a ceremony on Garth. This is politically very important, as the conservative and conscientious Thennanin are a major military power and the Neo-Gorillas' choice converts the Thennanin from enemies to allies of EarthClan. After adoption by the Thennanin, the Neo-Gorillas are termed "Garthlings."

=== Kiqui ===
Kiqui are a pre-sapient amphibious species first discovered on the planet Kithrup by Streaker's crew, who persuade them to be uplifted as clients of the humans. If this goes ahead, the Kiqui would become humanity's first extraterrestrial clients.

== Major themes ==
=== Uplift ===
The concept of Uplift is a major theme of the novels and has been referred to and discussed in numerous science articles, including both psychology and zoological journals. The novel content has been referred to as excellent cases of theoretical uplift scenarios by George Dvorsky, writing in the Journal of Evolution and technology. The concept itself has been addressed by other writers before Brin, including H.G. Wells in The Island of Doctor Moreau. Brin, however, is notable for having coined the term, which has since been used by academics writing in the field generally for the concept

==== Uplift as a positive concept ====
Brin himself has noted that in previous examples of uplift, the process was a Frankenstein-like negative concept, with the animals becoming tools or slaves, or in the case of the Planet of the Apes, villains. In Brin's works, the same concept is used positively to bring humans closer to animals, which he sees as an endgame. Brin's take on the concept is more positive, with the "human patrons and their chimp and dolphin clients work together in a joyous partnership", and that it is almost the human's duty to uplift lesser creatures to an equal footing with their patrons.

=== Ecology ===
Ecology and stewardship of genetic diversity are major themes in the Uplift books. In this Universe, the protection of ecology is given a lot of importance by the various alien races, and those races found to be ecologically destructive are seen as criminals by the various other races in the books, and punished for their crimes.

==== Religion ====
Religious orthodoxy and the behavior of static societies are also themes. Most of the races that antagonize EarthClan and pursue Streaker are described as religious fanatics, and are angry at the possibility that lowly EarthClan may have discovered the fate of the Progenitors, possibly in direct contradiction to the core beliefs of several galactic religions. Earthclan mostly does not follow these religions, instead half-jokingly entrusting their fate to Ifni, a goddess of luck and chance, although there is also a subset of Earthclan known as the Daniks who are in a cult that believes galactic con-artists, the Rothen, are humanity's lost patrons.

=== Speciesism ===
One of the main themes of his work is the idea of speciesism. Brin's themes of animals uplifted to humans has been noted as rallying against speciesist viewpoints in modern society. His work implies that humans are not that different from animals. Brin himself has spoken about the glass ceiling that non human species are up against in terms of evolution, and how it is almost the luck of the draw that humans were the chosen phylum to achieve sentience. It has been noted, despite the uplifting of some species, and Brin's work seeking an egalitarian proposed society for lower life forms and humans, that humans are still positioned in the novels as the central heroes.

Brin and his work allegedly proposes that it is almost selfish of humans not to consider uplifting other creatures to the human level of sentience.

=== Devolution ===
Devolution is also a theme in his work. This is one of the methods in the books for indicating the difference between humans and other sophonts. Both the Neo Chimpanzees and the Neo Dolphins at time revert to their basic animal nature, in particular when under stress, at one point the whole dolphin crew, except for a few, all devolve to basic animal behaviour. This brings great shame to them, in particular to the Neo Chimpanzees. Because the clients have gained their sentience via uplifting and the process is incomplete, it is imperfect, and they can at times revert to their devolved state. The theme of devolution is also investigated through the six races on Jijo, who profess to actually aspire to it, as part of a self-discovery mystical experience. In contrast to the Aliens and the uplifted animals, the humans do not devolve nor wish to.

=== The importance of language ===
The importance of language is also a theme, with the gaining of language being a marker of sentience, and the loss of it in certain situations by the chimps as a shameful thing. Aliens testo both mental and physical abilities on the uplifted animals, and while physical abilities between non-uplifted chimps and uplifted ones will be the same, mental abilities obviously will be enhanced. In terms of language for instance, humans are proud of the chimp character Jeffrey (the main chimp character in Sundiver), who continues to use human speech, even when faced with the stress of death, which he succumbs to. The level of sophistication of languages is something that was noted in by Ina Roay-Faderman, who notes that only some sophisticated languages could be used to describe highly technical issues to deal with space travel.

=== Colonialism ===
Some commentary has highlighted the parallels between the uplifted races and their patrons, and colonialism. Brin himself is quite critical of the concept, and highlights where some patrons uplift lesser beings, and then exploit them instead of helping them. Humans however on the whole treat their uplifted clients better than many others are treated by their patrons, generally, within the galaxy.

== Plot outline ==
The first book in the Uplift series, Sundiver (1980), is essentially a detective story and occurs only decades after humanity's first contact with the Five Galaxies. In this story mankind discovers the sun's inhabitants and a plot to overthrow a patron race. This is the only novel to directly involve Earth. The protagonist, Jacob Demwa, is referenced in later novels as a mentor to Gillian Baskin and Tom Orley, and the captain of the Sundiver appears briefly in The Uplift War, having been promoted to admiral. This suggests human lifespans have been significantly extended by galactic technology.

The second book, Startide Rising (1983), occurs centuries later. It follows the Earthclan amphibious spaceship Streaker (crewed by uplifted dolphins and their human patrons) which has discovered a colossal derelict fleet. Streaker is pursued as rumors spread throughout the Five Galaxies that the ship has found the remains of the Progenitors.

The third book, The Uplift War (1987), occurs around the same time as Startide Rising but in another part of the galaxy. An intergalactic war, sparked by the events of Startide Rising, results in a successful invasion of the EarthClan colony on the planet Garth, heavily populated by uplifted chimps.

In 1995 Brightness Reef was published, the first book in a new Uplift trilogy. The "Uplift Storm" trilogy (excluding the first book, which solely focuses on Jijo) follows the survivors of the spaceship Streaker as they continue to evade the various galactic powers. Along the way they encounter a hidden planet which has been inhabited by six races which have illegally settled and dropped out of the civilization of the Five Galaxies. They eventually make contact with the other orders of life. The second and third books in the new Uplift trilogy are Infinity's Shore and Heaven's Reach.

In Heaven's Reach, the series sums up with conclusions on the nature of life in the universe and revelations on the motivations of the oldest species in the Five Galaxies. Further explanations are provided on the Streaker's continuing mission, Earth's fate after invasion, and the nature of galactic life in the overlapping conspiracies of galactic civilization.

The short story "Aficionado" or "Life in the Extreme" is set earliest of all the currently written work and gives an account of the early days of the human uplift program before Contact. The contents of this story have since been reused as part of the unrelated novel Existence, making its position in the uplift universe uncertain.

The novella Temptation is set back on Jijo just after the ending of Infinity's Shore, and tells what happened to some of the characters from the trilogy after Streaker escaped from Jijo, as well as offering some hints as to the fate of the mysterious Buyur, the last race to legally settle there.

== Timeline ==
Below is a summarized timeline for events detailed in the Uplift Universe, which corresponds to the Gregorian calendar:

Date	Event
2212	Contact with Galactic civilization
2246	Sundiver incident
2489	Events of Startide Rising
2492	Post Uplift War

== See also ==
- The Island of Doctor Moreau
