= Startide Rising =

1983 science fiction novel by David Brin

- Cover of first edition (paperback)
- Author: David Brin
- Language: English
- Series: Uplift Universe
- Genre: Science fiction
- Publisher: Bantam Books
- Publication date: 1983
- Publication place: United States
- Media type: Print (Paperback & Hardback)
- Pages: 462 (first edition, paperback)
- Award: Locus Award for Best Science Fiction Novel (1984)
- ISBN: 0-553-23495-1 (first edition, paperback)
- OCLC: 9865177
- LC Class: CPB Box no. 2914 vol. 13
- Preceded by: Sundiver
- Followed by: The Uplift War

Startide Rising is a 1983 science fiction novel by American writer David Brin, the second book of six set in his Uplift Universe (preceded by Sundiver and followed by The Uplift War). It earned both Hugo and Nebula Awards for Best Novel in 1984. It was revised by the author in 1993 to correct errors and omissions from the original edition.

An early work by David Brin, it was extremely well reviewed when it was published, has remained popular, and served as the seed for three more novels which revolved around the crew of the Earthship Streaker (the Uplift Storm Trilogy).

Parts of Startide Rising were published as "The Tides of Kithrup" in the May 1981 issue of Analog. The Tides of Kithrup was an early title of the novel; uncorrected proofs of the novel that still bear that title have become collector's items.

== Plot summary ==
In the year 2489 C.E., the Terran spaceship Streaker — crewed by 150 uplifted dolphins, seven humans, and one uplifted chimpanzee — discovers a derelict fleet of 50000 spaceships the size of small moons in a shallow cluster. They appear to belong to the Progenitors, the legendary "first race" that uplifted the other species. The captain's gig is sent to investigate but is destroyed along with one of the derelict craft — killing 10 crew members. Streaker manages to recover some artifacts from the destroyed derelict and one well-preserved alien body. The crew of Streaker uses psi-cast to inform Earth of their discovery and to send a hologram of the alien.

When Streaker receives a reply, it is in code. Decrypted, it says only: “Go into hiding. Await orders. Do not reply.” Attempting to comply, Streaker is ambushed at the Morgran transfer point and pursued by opposing fleets belonging to a number of extremist galactic clans and species (most or all of them devout of the quasi-religious "Alliances") — 'crusaders' seeking to claim the dead fleet for themselves for various religious reasons.

The novel begins about one month after the discovery in the cluster as Streaker arrives on the planet Kithrup, which has vast oceans, offering an ideal environment for the neodolphin crew to attempt to hide and repair their damaged ship. Almost immediately, the crusaders begin to arrive — dashing Streaker's hopes of hiding for very long, but some time remains for repairs when the armadas begin fighting each other for the right to capture Streaker.

A Thennanin dreadnought is damaged during the fighting and crashes into the ocean near Streaker's hiding place. The resultant tsunami strands several crew and causes several of the neo-dolphins to panic and revert to an instinctual, pre-uplifted mental state. Some of the stranded crew encounter pre-sentient natives (called Kiqui).

Meanwhile, on Streaker, several crew members secretly plan a mutiny and defection while the officers plan to salvage parts from the Thennanin wreck. Streaker cannot be moved for fear of detection and because of the ongoing repairs, and so the salvage team uses undersea transportation to get to the wreck. The salvage team discovers the wreck's hull is mostly undamaged, and the Terrans form a plan to hide Streaker inside the Thennanin dreadnought hull and make their escape. As a bonus, several crew members salvage the Thennanin dreadnought's micro-branch of the galactic library for comparison with the Streaker's own copy, as Earth suspects their libraries have been sabotaged, with certain information redacted "for the greater good" of 'primitive' humans.

The mutinous crew, led by Takkata-Jim, sabotage equipment, leading to Captain Creideiki becoming brain damaged, although he later recovers somewhat. Before he can be caught, Takkata-Jim flees in a shuttle, but the shuttle has been sabotaged by the loyal crew, and he is sent into the middle of the battle over Kithrup with his radio disabled and his weapons set to fire when any ship approaches. Takkata-Jim unintentionally draws off the two largest remaining fleets.

In the confusion, Streaker almost escapes without incident hidden in the Thennanin hull, but is confronted by several ships belonging to the Brothers of the Night (Brethren). Streaker is saved when six Thennanin ships, saving one of their "own", fight off the Brethren warriors. Streaker then flees to the transfer point, but before fleeing, sends a mocking transmission to the crusading armadas.

The dolphins in the novel speak three languages: Primal, Trinary and Anglic. Primal and Trinary are represented as haiku-esque poems (two of the human characters quote Yosa Buson), while Anglic is a hypothetical English-derivative (not to be confused with the actual Anglic family of languages containing modern English, its ancestors, and its close relatives like Scots), rendered for the reader as standard English.

The book shifts point of view frequently from character to character, ranging from humans, to dolphins, to a number of the alien races that are trying to destroy, capture, or help the Streaker. This allows the reader to get some idea of how the crew of the Streaker fits within the larger context of Galactic affairs. All of the alien races described in this book, and numerous others, are further described and illustrated in the book Contacting Aliens: An Illustrated Guide to David Brin's Uplift Universe.

== Film version ==
In 1998 a screenplay, written by Trevor Sands and based on the book, was in development at Mace Neufeld Productions. However, according to Trevor Sands, the option expired and the screenplay has been tabled.

== Translations ==
- Bulgarian: "Звездна вълна се надига" ("A star wave is rising"), 1994.
- Chinese: 星潮汹涌, 1998; 星潮闪电, 2001
- Danish: "Stjerneflod" ("Star Tide"), 1988.
- Dutch: "Strijd tussen de sterren" ("Battle between the stars"), 1995.
- Finnish: "Tähtisumu täyttyy" ("Nebula fills up"), 1987.
- French: "Marée stellaire" ("Stellar tide"), 1998, 2001.
- German: "Sternenflut" ("Star Tide"), 1985, 1993, 2000.
- Hebrew: "גאות הכוכב" ("Star Tide"), 1999
- Hungarian: "Csillagdagály" ("Star Tide"), 1996
- Italian: "Le maree di Kithrup" ("The Tides of Kithrup"), 1985.
- Korean: "떠오르는 행성" ("The Rising Planet"), 1992.
- Polish: "Gwiezdny przypływ" ("Star Tide"), 1997.
- Romanian: "Maree stelară" ("Stellar tide"), 2014.
- Russian: "Звёздный прилив" ("Star Tide"), 1995, 1998, 2002.
- Serbian: "Подизање звездане плиме" ("Startide Rising"), 1988.
- Spanish: "Marea estelar" ("Star Tide"), 1986.
- Swedish: "Vid stjärnhavets strand" ("On the beach of the sea of stars"), 1990.

== See also ==
- Akeakamai – Bottlenose dolphin, subject of animal language research – the real-life dolphin from Louis Herman's animal language research, after whom a neo-dolphin member of the Streaker's crew is named.
- Cetacean intelligence
- List of underwater science fiction works
