= Alberto Monteiro =

Portuguese footballer

Fialho
Personal information
- Full name: Alberto António Monteiro
- Date of birth: 18 July 1928
- Place of birth: Cape Verde
- Date of death: 20 October 2015 (aged 87)
- Place of death: Évora, Portugal
- Position: Forward

Senior career*
Years	Team	Apps	(Gls)
1951–1953	Bissau e Benfica		
1953–1956	Benfica	33	(9)
1956–1962	Lusitano de Évora	100	(25)
Total		133	(34)
- * Club domestic league appearances and goals

Alberto António Monteiro (18 July 1928 – 20 October 2015), known as Fialho, is a former Portuguese footballer who played as a forward.

== Career ==
Born in Cape Verde, Fialho began his career at Bissau e Benfica, a club associated with Benfica. In 1953, the 25-year old signed with Benfica and made his first appearance on 4 October of the same year, in a 2–0 win over Lusitano de Évora.

With strong competition from Arsenio Duarte, José Águas and Rogério Pipi, his playing time was restricted, but he still appeared in 18 games during his first year and 17 in his second, winning the league title in the latter. After just game in 1955–56, he departed the club to play for Lusitano de Èvora.

He spent six years in Lusitano, with mild success. After retiring, he continued to live in the city, where he died on 20 October 2015.

== Honours ==
Benfica

- Primeira Liga:1954–55
