= Uplift Storm trilogy =

Science fiction series by David Brin

Brightness Reef
- Cover of first edition (hardcover)
- Author: David Brin
- Language: English
- Genre: Science fiction
- Publisher: Bantam Books
- Publication date: October 1995
- Publication place: United States
- Media type: Print (Hardcover & Paperback)
- Pages: 518
- ISBN: 0-553-10034-3
- OCLC: 32429193
- Dewey Decimal: 813/.54 20
- LC Class: PS3552.R4825 B75 1995

Infinity's Shore
- Author: David Brin
- Cover artist: Jim Burns
- Language: English
- Genre: Science fiction
- Published: 1996 (Spectra)
- Publication place: United States
- Media type: Print (Hardcover & Paperback)
- Pages: 644
- ISBN: 0-553-57777-8
- OCLC: 38045623

Heaven's Reach
- Author: David Brin
- Language: English
- Genre: Science fiction
- Publisher: Spectra
- Publication date: 1998
- Publication place: United States
- Media type: Print (Hardcover & Paperback)
- Pages: 464
- ISBN: 0-553-10174-9
- OCLC: 38239177
- Dewey Decimal: 813/.54 21
- LC Class: PS3552.R4825 H43 1998

The Uplift Storm trilogy, also called The Uplift Trilogy is a series of novels set in David Brin's Uplift Universe. The entire trilogy is one long tale, with no gaps in the timeline between volumes.

The three novels are:

- Brightness Reef (1995)
- Infinity's Shore (1996)
- Heaven's Reach (1998)

Additionally there is short novella, Temptation set around the same time as the events of Heaven's Reach

== Setting ==
=== Jijo ===
The setting of the majority of the first two novels and the novella Temptation is the planet Jijo. Jijo was declared fallow for one million years by the Migration Institute, in order to give it a chance to recover from successive colonies, but has been illegally populated by fugitives from several races seeking refuge there. By mutual agreement, they all live on one geologically active area of the planet called "The Slope", ensuring that in time all trace of their settlements will be recycled back into the planet by subduction. If this law is broken and the so-called "Sooners" refuse to return to the Slope, the penalty is death.

The Commons is a loose quasi-government on the Slope of Jijo. It is composed of members of six races: G'Kek's, Humans, Hoons, Traeki, Qheuen, and Urs. The Commons was formed as a unity government to stop wars that had plagued the Slope for decades. Each race has a "High Sage" that represents them on a council, and lesser sages perform various other tasks on behalf of the Commons. Other races present include Glavers, the only race on Jijo to actually progress down the devolutionary "Path of Redemption", partially uplifted chimpanzees, known as "Chims", and Noor Beasts, a blend of non-uplifted root stock of the Tytlal race, and actual Tytlals passing as beasts.

=== The Fractal World ===
The Fractal World is an enormous, hollow artificial structure built around a dying dwarf star, the inside of which is used as a refuge by races in the Retired Order, or "Old Ones", that have supposedly retired from active participation in the affairs of the Five Galaxies.

=== Kazzkark ===
Kazzkark is a small planetoid, hollowed out to serve as a base for several of the Great Institutes, and a way station for travelers passing through nearby transfer points. For a time it is extremely crowded with refugees and religious fervor as the Time of Changes begins, but space tremors cause it to be abandoned shortly before it is destroyed.

=== E-Level Hyperspace ===
E-space is an off-limits level of hyperspace for most orders of life, a strange realm where thoughts can become real and mere concepts can cause real harm. Its only natural inhabitants are "memetic" organisms. They are unable to exist outside of E-space without a host organism. Members of a mysterious order of life known as the Quantum Order are known to pass through E Level sometimes.

== Main characters ==
=== The Slope ===
- Alvin. A young Hoon, his given name is Hph-wayou. Member of a group of young friends whose adventures are documented in Alvin's journal.
- Asx Traeki High Sage. He is later converted into a Jophur called Ewasx, and eventually transforms himself into a new being simply called X.
- Blade. A blue Qheuen, part of Sara Koolhan's traveling party.
- Lester Cambel. Human High Sage.
- Emerson D'Antie. Also known as "The Stranger". A human found in a swamp with amnesia and a horrifying head wound that removed his speech center. Eventually revealed to be a former engineer aboard Streaker.
- Huck Outspoken G'Kek member of Alvin's group.
- Huphu Alvin's Noor beast, mascot of their group.
- Jass Brutal leader of the Sooner band Rety escaped from.
- Jop Human fanatic who believes they should destroy all signs of civilization the moment the aliens arrive.
- Koolhan family Siblings, Sara, Dwer, and Lark, and their father Nelo. Sara cares for The Stranger when he is first discovered and leads a group from Dolo Village sent out in response to the alien landing. Dwer is the chief tracker for the Commons, Lark is a naturalist and later appointed a junior Sage despite his heretical beliefs. Their father owns the paper mill in Dolo Village.
- Mudfoot Noor beast that follows Dwer around, to his annoyance. Eventually revealed to be a fully sentient Tytlal.
- Pincer-Tip Qheuen member of Alvin's group who is always claiming to have seen sea monsters.
- Prity Chim companion to Sara Koolhan, she makes intricate mathematics-based drawings.
- Rety Escaped Sooner girl who has a grudging friendship with Dwer and an Urrish "husband".
- Uriel Urrish metal smith and intellectual, she has constructed an immense analog computer at her forge at Mount Guenn
- Ur-ronn Uriel's niece and part of Alvin's group.
- yee. Urrish male, "husband" to Rety.

=== Rothen and Daniks ===
The Rothen are an itinerant race with no home world. They are known to many as criminals. They claim to be the lost patron race of humanity, and the Daniks are a cult of humans and other EarthClan species that believe they are humanity's only hope in a hostile universe.

- Kunn Human pilot.
- Ling Human biologist, when the Rothen's deceit and vitriol are revealed, she defects and becomes Lark Koolhan's companion and lover.
- Rann Leader of the humans in the Danik expedition.
- Besh Human pilot and biologist, killed on Jijo. She was likely an agent of the Terragens Council who infiltrated the Daniks.
- Ro-kenn Apparent leader of the Rothen expedition to Jijo, captured by The Commons and turned over to Streaker, only to escape, murdering Pincer-Tip in the process.
- Ro-pol Rothen female, apparent mate to Ro-Kenn, killed on Jijo, her symbiotic "mask" leaves her face, revealing the true appearance of the Rothen.

=== Streakers ===
Most of these characters were introduced in Startide Rising and do not re-appear until Infinity's Shore.

- Gillian Baskin Physician and de facto captain of Streaker after the losses of most neodolphin command staff.
- Chissis: neodolphin researcher and pilot, part of the party left on Jijo due to suffering from partial stress atavism
- Brookida Dolphin metallurgist, somewhat older and wiser than many of the other neodolphins aboard.
- "Lucky" Kaa Highly skilled neodolphin pilot, becomes involved with Peepoe.
- Makanee Female Neodolphin, ship surgeon.
- Mopol Crewman suffering from "stress atavism" who, along with Zhaki, abducts Peepoe as a sex slave.
- Niss A sarcastic artificial intelligence, lent to Streaker by EarthClan allies the Tymbrimi and programmed to be pleased by being surprised. It both frustrates and aids Gillian Baskin as one of her primary advisors.
- Hannes Suessi Human chief engineer, modified into a cyborg by the Old Ones.
- Tkett neodolphin archeologist, part of the party left on Jijo, searches for Peepoe
- T'sh't Dolphin command officer, she technically shares command with Gillian Baskin. It becomes clear that she is a secret member of the Danik cult, and betrayed Streaker to the Rothen in the belief that they would help. Her actions are the proximate cause of the Rothen and later the Jophur arriving on Jijo. She is killed when once again betraying the crew, this time to the Old Ones.
- Zhaki Mopol's partner in crime.

=== Kazzkark ===
- Harry Harms First neochimp ever selected as a scout in E-Space for the Navigation Institute. While his duties require him to remain neutral, he still feels loyalty to fellow members of EarthClan species.
- Kiwei Ha'aoulin A Synthian trader who gets caught up with Dwer and Harry and returns to Jijo with them.

== Plot ==
=== Brightness Reef ===
Brightness Reef introduces the reader to the planet Jijo, a world that had been declared fallow, but one area, known as The Slope, is illegally inhabited by eight different galactic races, most supposedly seeking the "Path of Redemption", the goal of which is to devolve into a non-sapient life form, to be re-uplifted by a new patron race in the future. The peaceful, primitive society of Jijo is severely disrupted by the arrival of offworlders, first a mysterious mute human, followed by a starship belonging to the Rothen, a race of galactic criminals, and their human devotees, the Daniks. The Commons of Jijo establishes an uneasy, distrustful relationship with the Daniks for a short time, but events accelerate rapidly and it becomes clear that the Rothen are amoral, attempting to cause friction between the races of the Commons, and possibly genocidal. Jijoan religious fanatics also cause friction and in some cases commit acts of destruction and violence, further complicating matters.

At the same time, elsewhere on Jijo, a young member of Hoon race named Alvin and his friends from several races receive unexpected help in their quest to make a bathysphere for underwater exploring. They are assisted by Uriel, a sage of the urrish race, who asks their help in locating a hidden underwater cache of galactic technology. The bathysphere fails while deep underwater, and the young crew is rescued by mysterious metal-clad beings. On the other end of "the Slope" a small group of humans attempts to quietly form a new settlement that may escape the murderous intent of the Rothen, but they find their Danik servants already there. A fight ensues and the group is scattered.

Back at the glade of gathering where the Commons of Jijo was in conflict with the Daniks, their differences suddenly become moot when a much larger starship lands directly atop the Rothen craft, imprisoning it in a quantum time-shifted substance. The huge battleship is revealed to be operated by the terrifying Jophur, the supremely egotistical and violent form of the peaceful and kind Traeki that live on Jijo.

=== Infinity's Shore ===
Alvin's group find themselves on a mysterious ship hidden deep in Jijo's seas. They are treated kindly but remain ignorant of who captured/rescued them from the depths. The reader, however, becomes aware they are aboard Streaker, the dolphin-crewed EarthClan ship not seen since the events of Startide Rising, some two years earlier in the series internal timeline. The crew is astonished to find all the different races living on Jijo, and the human commander, Gillian Baskin, is unsure what to do with the youngsters. She sends a dolphin raiding party to the mainland where both a Jophur and Danik support craft have crashed after fighting one another, and they return with Rety, a human child from a band of even more primitive humans leading a wretched existence outside the society of the Slope, and Dwer, chief scout of the Commons, who has a strained but genuine friendship with the young girl. They are accompanied by Mudfoot, known to Dwer as annoying "noor beast" but recognized by the Streaker crew as a Tytlal, a client race of the Tymbrimi, Earthclan's closest and most loyal allies, notorious for elaborate pranks.

Back on the Slope, the Jophur commit terrible acts of war, they are especially enraged to find the G'Kek race on Jijo, as they had engaged in a war of extermination against them and they were believed to be extinct. The Commons are secretly communicating with the Daniks aboard their now-submerged spacecraft, and are also constructing numerous new weapons and primitive technologies to improve their communication and defense capabilities. The Jophur remain ignorant of most of these efforts as they are simply unable to recognize them for what they are, but they do capture Lark Koolhan and Ling. The two of them manage to escape captivity and hide on the Jophur ship, which they learn is named Polkihjy.

Gillian Baskin decides to send the young friends into exile on a small island, for their own protection, but Alvin realizes at the last moment whose ship they have been on and demands to be allowed to stay. Contact is established between Streaker and Uriel the smith, and there is an exchange of personnel and equipment at Wuphon Port. Gillian is astounded to find her old crew mate Emerson, is the mysterious mute stranger who has been traveling with Sara Koolhan, they both join Streaker while much of her crew is left on Jijo. Streaker makes a bold escape attempt from Jijo using dozens of ancient derelict craft from the ocean bottom as decoys, as well as decoy balloons overseen by Dwer Koolhan. Polkihjy leaves Jijo to pursue Streaker, and Jijo's part in the tale ends with Nelo planning to rebuild his paper mill that was destroyed by religious fanatics.

As Streaker desperately flees towards the nearest hyperspace transfer point, Jijo's "Holy Egg" emits a powerful psychic blast that is felt by nearly everyone, and temporarily stuns the entire crew of the Jophur battleship.

=== Heaven's Reach ===
The final installment introduces a new character, Harry Harms, the first neochimp to be selected to serve as a scout for the Navigation Institute, and new setting, the bizarre realm of "E-level hyperspace". Harry detects unusual activity and eventually encounters Rety and Dwer, who had an improbable reunion aboard one of the decoy ships and wandered into E-level hyperspace due to their total lack of knowledge of space technology. Harry brings them to Kazzkark, his home base, normally a sleepy outpost for galactic institutes but now teeming with refugees and the home of a strange new religion.

Streaker has received assistance and guidance from an unlikely ally, hydrogen-breathing life forms and machine lifeforms in their employ. The crew is dismayed to find that they have arrived back at the massive fractal world where they had been betrayed before by supposedly neutral members of the Retired Order. Old resentments seemingly rekindle and the fractal world erupts into fighting and chaos, resulting in millions of deaths and the collapse of the delicate structure of the world. Streaker narrowly evades another ambush and manages to escape in the chaos, still pursued by Polkihjy, which is barely under Jophur control as it has been invaded by hydrogen-breathing life forms. Lark, Ling, and the former Traeki sage Asx have all merged with one single gigantic life form now occupying much of the ship, which they simply call "Mother".

On Kazzkark, the youths from Wuphon Port, having been sent away because Gillian fears Streaker is on a suicide mission, arrive along with Kaa, the dolphin hotshot pilot. Alvin befriends local Hoons and he and Huck depart with them as they flee Kazzkark, which is becoming unstable. Ur-ronn meets starfaring urs and leaves with them. Pincer-Tip is killed by Ro-kenn, who was stowed away on their shuttle. Rety has become enamored of the new religious cult on Kazzkark and believes she is being held up as a leader of the movement, when in fact the cult plans to sacrifice her as a symbol of what they believe will be ultimately necessary, the sacrifice of Earth itself and all of EarthClan. Dwer and Harry, now joined by a Synthian trader, rescue Rety from the cult and barely escape Kazzkark as space tremors tear it apart. It is clear that a foretold "Time of Changes" is upon the civilization of the five galaxies, and momentous and often catastrophic events are occurring out on the space lanes. The group travel through E-Space, on what proves to be Harry's final mission for the Navigation Institute. Kaa, pushing his skills to the absolute limit, manages to get them back to Jijo's system just as all transfer threads in that entire galaxy collapse, meaning that galaxy is now cut off from the civilization of the five galaxies. They spot several other ships similarly stranded or destroyed, as well as a small rocket traveling from Jijo to a neighboring moon.

Streaker is forced to negotiate with members of the Transcendent Order, who wish to send them as emissaries to a distant galaxy. They convince the Transcendents, who send Polkihjy instead. Lark manages to briefly communicate with Streaker before they are cast into deep space, giving them several pieces of crucial information. Streaker finally arrives at the Earth system, which is heavily besieged by a massive space armada. They attempt to break through the lines by distracting the fleet with a strange, taunting holographic message. The tactic works better than imagined, frightening the fanatics into believing that they may have offended the Progenitors, and they give up the siege. Earth is free, for now.

=== Temptation ===
Temptation is a novella by David Brin which was published in 1999 in the anthology Far Horizons: All New Tales from the Greatest Worlds of Science Fiction, ed. by Robert Silverberg.

This short novella returns to the planet Jijo. At the end of Infinity's Shore, a small group of neodolphins are left on Jijo, those suffering from "stress atavism", a condition wherein the subject reverts to a more primitive state similar to non-uplifted dolphins, as well as medical personnel to oversee them, and others deemed non-essential to Streaker's desperate final mission. Additionally, they are to search for Peepoe, a nurse who was abducted by two reverted dolphins, Zhaki and Mopol, who wished to remain on Jijo with her as their unwilling sexual partner.

Tkett was an archeologist aboard Streaker and is among those that were considered non-essential. Using the dolphin's highly sensitive underwater hearing, he detects the sound of engines and, believing this may be one of the many ancient ships used as decoys during Streakers escape from Jijo, goes in pursuit of it accompanied by Chissis, a partially reverted crew mate.

Peepoe also hears the sound of engines deep in the ocean and decides that the time has come for her to make an escape. She begins by swimming deep where her captors are less likely to notice her escape, but eventually resorts to a furious sprint across the surface once she detects the sounds of Mopol and Zhaki pursuing her with their powered sled. Exhausted, she comes to a point where she is directly above the engine noise, and she makes a desperate dive down toward it, finding not a spaceship but something that looks like a strange sea monster that grabs her with a tentacle as she loses consciousness.

Around this same time, Tkett and Chissis encounter the source of the noise they had been pursuing. It’s revealed to be an extremely large cylindrical machine moving across the ocean floor. They enter a hatch and find a strange realm within, where tiny versions of the six races that live on the surface live inside semi-transparent cubes, living entirely inside simulations. They see a great many of these cubes in numerous huge chambers within the machine.

Peepoe awakes in a pool inside the "creature" she encountered, and likewise finds tiny versions of the six races living inside of it, but in this case they live in fanciful villages along the shores of intricate waterways. It is explained to both dolphin parties that they have come earlier than expected to these simulations, but they are invited to remain there and live a life of endless adventure and excitement.

A holographic link is used to allow them to speak to one another, and to see that Zhaki and Mopol have already accepted the offer and are awaiting transformation and entry to the simulated worlds. They are told that nobody is forced to enter the simulations, but if they refuse their memory of the encounter will be erased in order to protect the secrecy of the project, which is now revealed to be a plot by the Buyur, the last race to legally inhabit Jijo. Their plan is that the descendants of those in the simulations will found an entirely new type of civilization that rejects science in favor of magic and wonder, all provided by the Buyur's machinery.

Tkett is repulsed by the idea and rejects it entirely, while Peepoe argues for accepting it and recruiting as many other dolphins as they can to join them. As they argue the point, Chissis suggests to Tkett that he listen more carefully to what Peepoe is saying, and he realizes there is a hidden sonar message behind her words advising him to "sleep on it".

Tkett awakens sometime later on the surface with the other two dolphins, disoriented to find himself already swimming at a rapid pace. Peepoe explains that she has realized the Buyur had no experience with cetacean brain structures, and would not realize that only one hemisphere of their brain sleeps at a time. Tkett suddenly recalls everything from their encounter, and the three agree they will fight against the plot. Chissis makes remarks that seem to indicate she is ready to return to full sapience with the others.

== Reception ==
=== Brightness Reef ===
The book received a number of reviews, including:

- by Paul Di Filippo (1995) in Science Fiction Age, November 1995
- by Thomas A. Easton [as Tom Easton] (1996) in Analog Science Fiction and Fact, February 1996
- by Don D'Ammassa (1996) in Science Fiction Chronicle, #188 February 1996
- anonymous (1996) in The Magazine of Fantasy & Science Fiction, March 1996
- by Joseph Nicholas (1996) in Vector 188
- by Peter Heck (1996) in Asimov's Science Fiction, August 1996
- by Steve Palmer (1996) in Vector 189
- by Paul J. McAuley (1996) in Foundation, #67 Summer 1996
- by Paul McDonald (1997) in The Zone and Premonitions, Spring 1997
- by Brian Stableford (1997) in The New York Review of Science Fiction, October 1997

=== Infinity's Shore ===
The book received a number of reviews, including:

- by Richard Parks (1997) in Science Fiction Age, January 1997
- by Ken Brown (1997) in Interzone, #117 March 1997
- by Thomas A. Easton [as Tom Easton] (1997) in Analog Science Fiction and Fact, March 1997
- by Mark L. Olson (1997) in Aboriginal Science Fiction, Winter 1997
- by Ken Alden [as Alan Kitch] (1997) in The Zone and Premonitions, Winter 1997-98
- by Catherine Asaro (1998) in SF Site, Mid-June 1998, (1998)

=== Heaven's Reach ===
The book received a number of reviews, including:

- by Brooks Peck (1998) in Science Fiction Weekly, 4 May 1998
- by Paul Di Filippo (1998) in Science Fiction Age, July 1998
- by Don D'Ammassa (1998) in Science Fiction Chronicle, #198 July–August 1998
- by Thomas A. Easton [as Tom Easton] (1998) in Analog Science Fiction and Fact, October 1998
- by Mark L. Olson (1998) in Aboriginal Science Fiction, Winter 1998
- by Mark Shainblum (1998) in SF Site, Mid-July 1998, (1998)
- by Gary Wilkinson (1999) in Vector 207
- Review [in German] by Frank Bartling (1999) in Alien Contact, Nummer 36
- Review [in French] by Claude Ecken (2000) in Galaxies, #16
