= Cetacean intelligence =

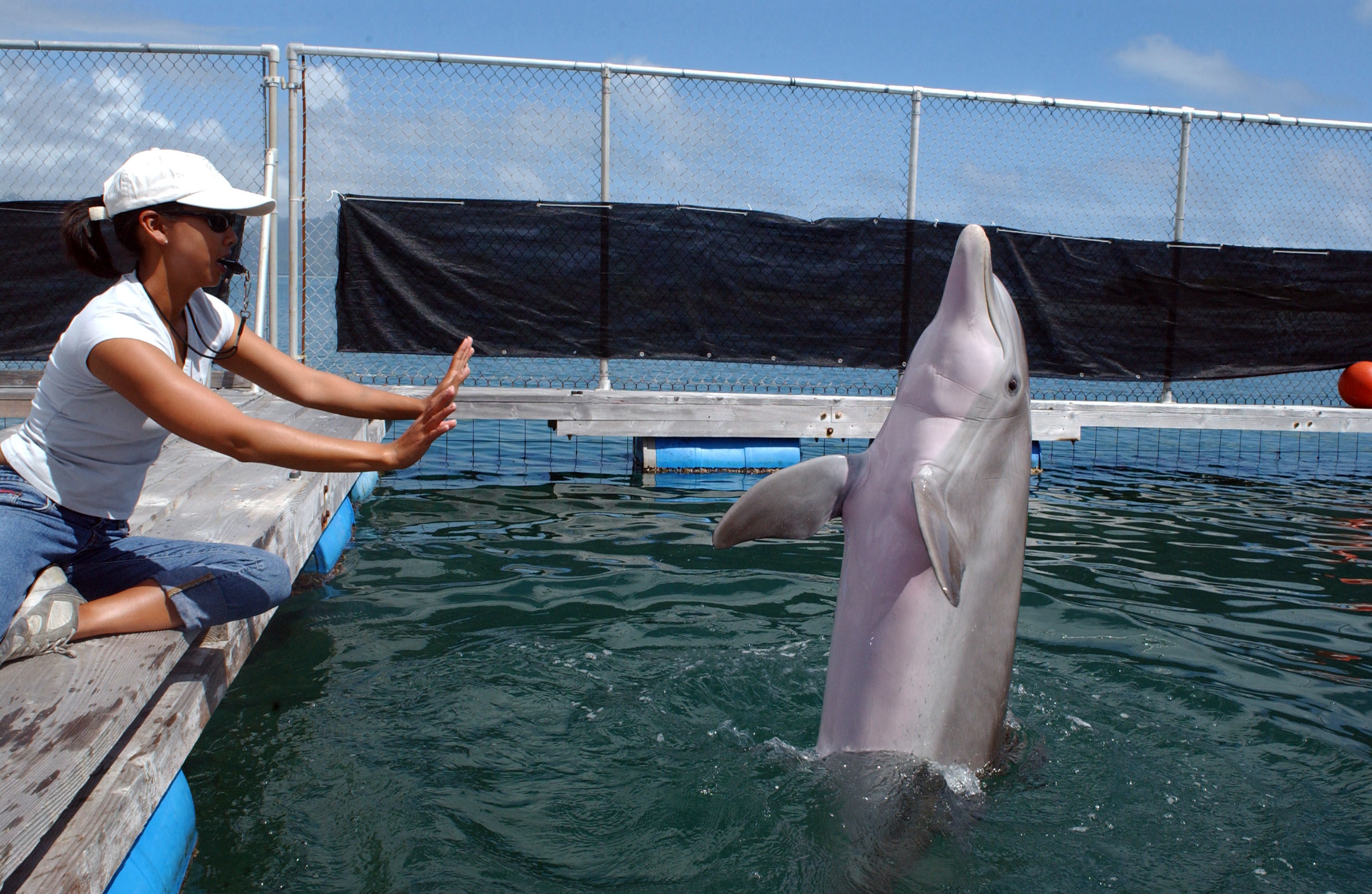
A female bottlenose dolphin performing with her trainer. They are considered one of the most intelligent cetaceans.

Cetacean intelligence is the overall intelligence and derived cognitive ability of aquatic mammals belonging in the infraorder Cetacea (cetaceans), including baleen whales, porpoises, and dolphins. In 2014, a study found that the long-finned pilot whale has more neocortical neurons than any other mammal, including humans, examined to date.

== Brain ==
=== Size ===
Brain size was previously considered a major indicator of the intelligence of an animal. However, many other factors also affect intelligence, and recent discoveries concerning bird intelligence have called the influence of brain size into question. Since most of the brain is used for maintaining bodily functions, greater ratios of brain to body mass may increase the amount of brain mass available for more complex cognitive tasks. Allometric analysis indicates that in general, mammalian brain size scales at approximately the 2/3 or 3/4 exponent of body mass. Comparison of actual brain size with the size expected from allometry provides an encephalization quotient (EQ) that can be used as a more accurate indicator of an animal's intelligence.

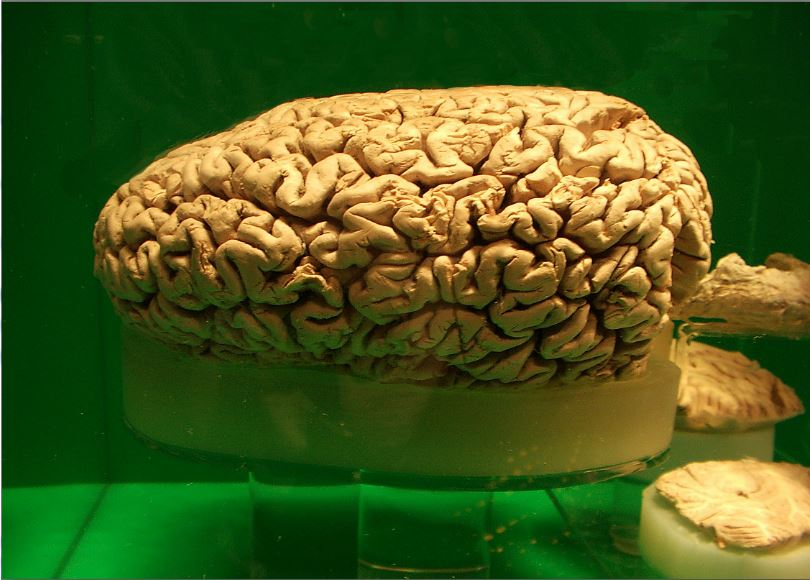
Brain of the sperm whale, considered the largest brain in the animal kingdom

- Sperm whales (Physeter macrocephalus) have the largest known brain mass of any extant animal, averaging 7.8 kg in mature males.
- Orcas (Orcinus orca) have the second largest known brain mass of any extant animal. (5.4-6.8 kg).
- Bottlenose dolphins (Tursiops truncatus) have an absolute brain mass of 1,500–1,700 grams. This is slightly greater than that of humans (1,300–1,400 grams) and about four times that of chimpanzees (400 grams).
- The brain to body mass ratio (not the encephalization quotient) in some members of the odontocete superfamily Delphinoidea (dolphins, porpoises, belugas, and narwhals) is greater than modern humans, and greater than all other mammals (there is debate whether that of the treeshrew might be second in place of humans). In some dolphins, it is less than half that of humans: 0.9% versus 2.1%. However, this comparison is complicated by the large amount of insulating blubber Delphinoidea brains have (15-20% of mass).
- The encephalization quotient (EQ) varies widely between species. The northern right whale dolphin has an EQ of approximately 5.55; the common bottlenose dolphin of 5.26; the tucuxi dolphin of 4.56; the orca of 2.57; the pygmy sperm whales of 1.78; the narwhals of 1.76; the La Plata dolphin of 1.67; the Ganges river dolphin of 1.55; the sperm whales of 0.58; the dwarf sperm whale of 1.63; the beluga whales of 2.24; the false killer whale of 4.03; the amazon river dolphin of 2.51; the cuvier's beaked whale of 0.92; the harbour porpoise of 2.95; the dall's porpoise of 3.54; and the blue whales of 0.19. In comparison to other animals, elephants have an EQ ranging from 1.13 to 2.36; chimpanzees of approximately 2.49; dogs of 1.17; cats of 1.00; and mice of 0.50. Sperm whale, Blue whale, and Humpback whale (EQ .18) are not thought to be exceptionally unintelligent, although they have very low EQs.
- The majority of mammals are born with a brain close to 90% of the adult brain weight. Humans are born with 28% of the adult brain weight, chimpanzees with 54%, bottlenose dolphins with 42.5%, and elephants with 35%.

Spindle cells (neurons without extensive branching) have been discovered in the brains of the humpback whale, fin whale, sperm whale, orca, bottlenose dolphins, Risso's dolphins, and beluga whales. Although spindle cells initially attracted significant interest because it was believed that they were restricted to other highly encephalized or socially complex species such as humans, great apes, and elephants, this was revised by later research which discovered spindle cells in a wider range of mammalian species and taxa, including domestic sheep, cows, the pygmy hippopotamus, and white-tailed deer, suggesting a more basal function. Other researchers have questioned whether the spindle cells discovered in non-hominid species such as dolphins correspond to the specialized-stick-corkscrew-cells described by von Economo as distinct from the more commonly found spindle cells.

=== Structure ===
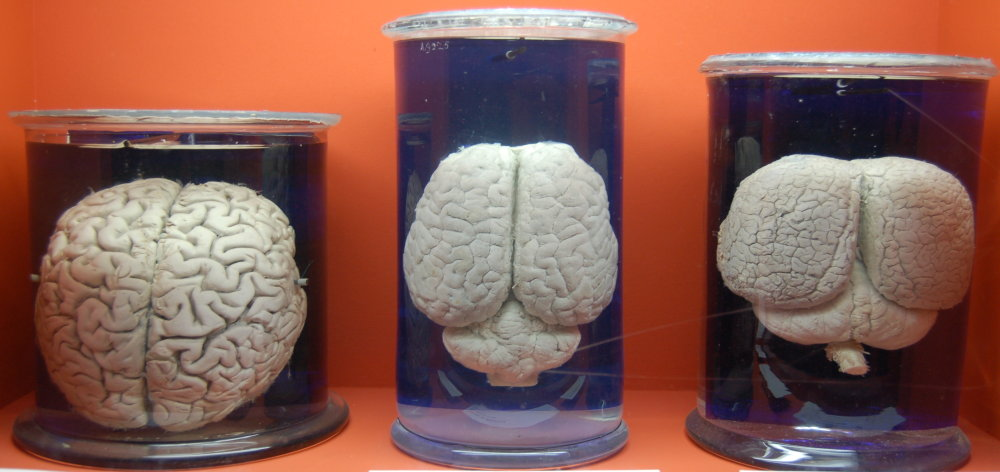
Brain of a human (left), compared to that of a black rhinoceros (center) and a common dolphin (right)

Elephant brains also show a complexity similar to dolphin brains, and are also more convoluted than that of humans, and with a cortex thicker than that of cetaceans. It is generally agreed that the growth of the neocortex, both absolutely and relative to the rest of the brain, during human evolution, has been responsible for the evolution of human intelligence, however defined. While a complex neocortex usually indicates high intelligence, there are exceptions. For example, the echidna has a highly developed brain, yet is not widely considered very intelligent, though preliminary investigations into their intelligence suggest that echidnas are capable of more advanced cognitive tasks than were previously assumed.

In 2014, it was shown for the first time that a species of dolphin, the long-finned pilot whale, has more neocortical neurons than any mammal studied to date including humans. Unlike terrestrial mammals, dolphin brains contain a paralimbic lobe, which may possibly be used for sensory processing. It has also been suggested that similar to humans, the paralimbic region of the brain is responsible for a dolphin's self-control, motivation, and emotions. The dolphin is a voluntary breather, even during sleep, with the result that veterinary anaesthesia of dolphins would result in asphyxiation. Ridgway reports that EEGs show alternating hemispheric asymmetry in slow waves during sleep, with occasional sleep-like waves from both hemispheres. This result has been interpreted to mean that dolphins sleep only one hemisphere of their brain at a time, possibly to control their voluntary respiration system or to be vigilant for predators.

The dolphin's greater dependence on sound processing is evident in the structure of its brain: its neural area devoted to visual imaging is only about one-tenth that of the human brain, while the area devoted to acoustical imaging is about 10 times as large. Sensory experiments suggest a great degree of cross-modal integration in the processing of shapes between echolocative and visual areas of the brain.

== Brain evolution ==
The evolution of encephalization in cetaceans is similar to that in primates. Though the general trend in their evolutionary history increased brain mass, body mass, and encephalization quotient, a few lineages actually underwent decephalization, although the selective pressures that caused this are still under debate. Among cetaceans, Odontoceti tend to have higher encephalization quotients than Mysticeti, which is at least partially due to the fact that Mysticeti have much larger body masses without a compensating increase in brain mass. As far as which selective pressures drove the encephalization (or decephalization) of cetacean brains, current research espouses a few main theories. The most promising suggests that cetacean brain size and complexity increased to support complex social relations. It could also have been driven by changes in diet, the emergence of echolocation, or an increase in territorial range.

== Problem-solving ability ==
Some research shows that dolphins, among other animals, understand concepts such as numerical continuity, though not necessarily counting. Dolphins may be able to discriminate between numbers.

Several researchers observing animals' ability to learn set formation tend to rank dolphins at about the level of elephants in intelligence, and show that dolphins do not surpass other highly intelligent animals in problem solving. A 1982 survey of other studies showed that in the learning of "set formation", dolphins rank highly, but not as high as some other animals.

== Behavior ==
=== Pod characteristics ===
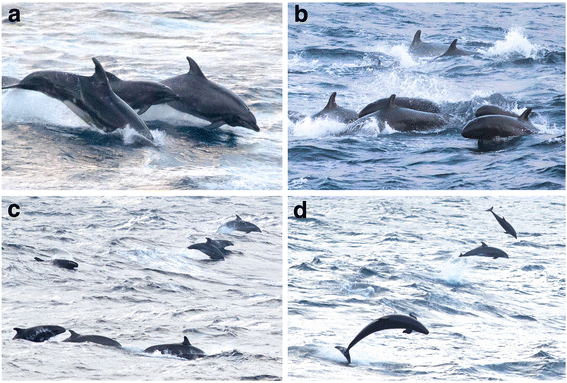
Interspecies pod of bottlenose dolphins and false killer whales

Dolphin group sizes vary quite dramatically. River dolphins usually congregate in fairly small groups from 6 to 12 in number or, in some species, singly or in pairs. The individuals in these small groups know and recognize one another. Other species such as the oceanic pantropical spotted dolphin, common dolphin and spinner dolphin travel in large groups of hundreds of individuals. It is unknown whether every member of the group is acquainted with every other. However, large packs can act as a single cohesive unit – observations show that if an unexpected disturbance, such as a shark approach, occurs from the flank or from beneath the group, the group moves in near-unison to avoid the threat. This means that the dolphins must be aware not only of their near neighbors but also of other individuals nearby – in a similar manner to which humans perform "audience waves". This is achieved by sight and possibly echolocation. One hypothesis proposed by Jerison (1986) is that members of a pod of dolphins are able to share echolocation results with each other to create a better understanding of their surroundings.

Southern resident orcas in British Columbia, Canada, and Washington, United States, live in extended family groups. The basis of the southern resident orca social structure is the matriline, consisting of a matriarch and her descendants of all generations. A number of matrilines form a southern resident orca pod, which is ongoing and extremely stable in membership, and has its own dialect which is stable over time. A southern resident calf is born into the pod of their mother and remains in it for life.

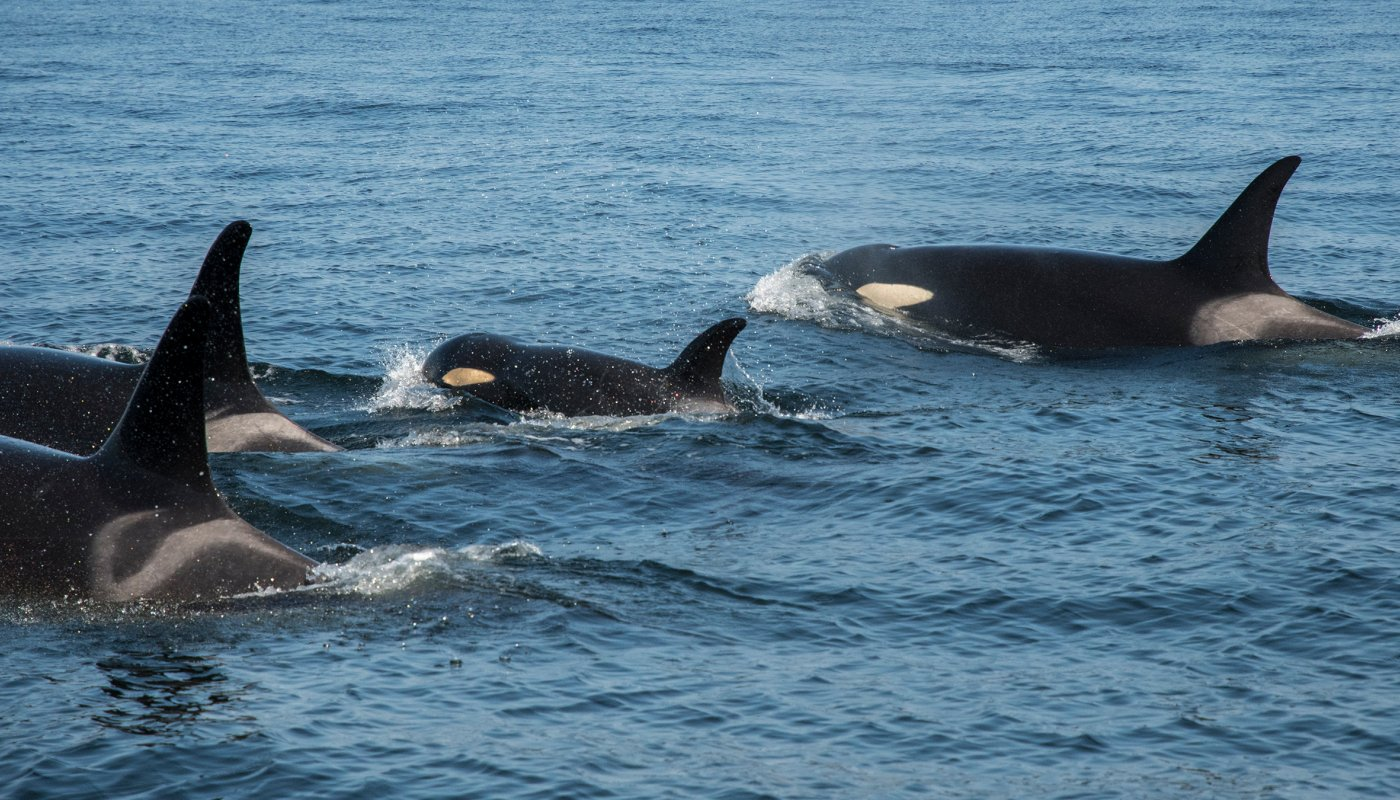
Members of a southern resident orca family unit travelling in formation with the mother and youngest offspring in the centre

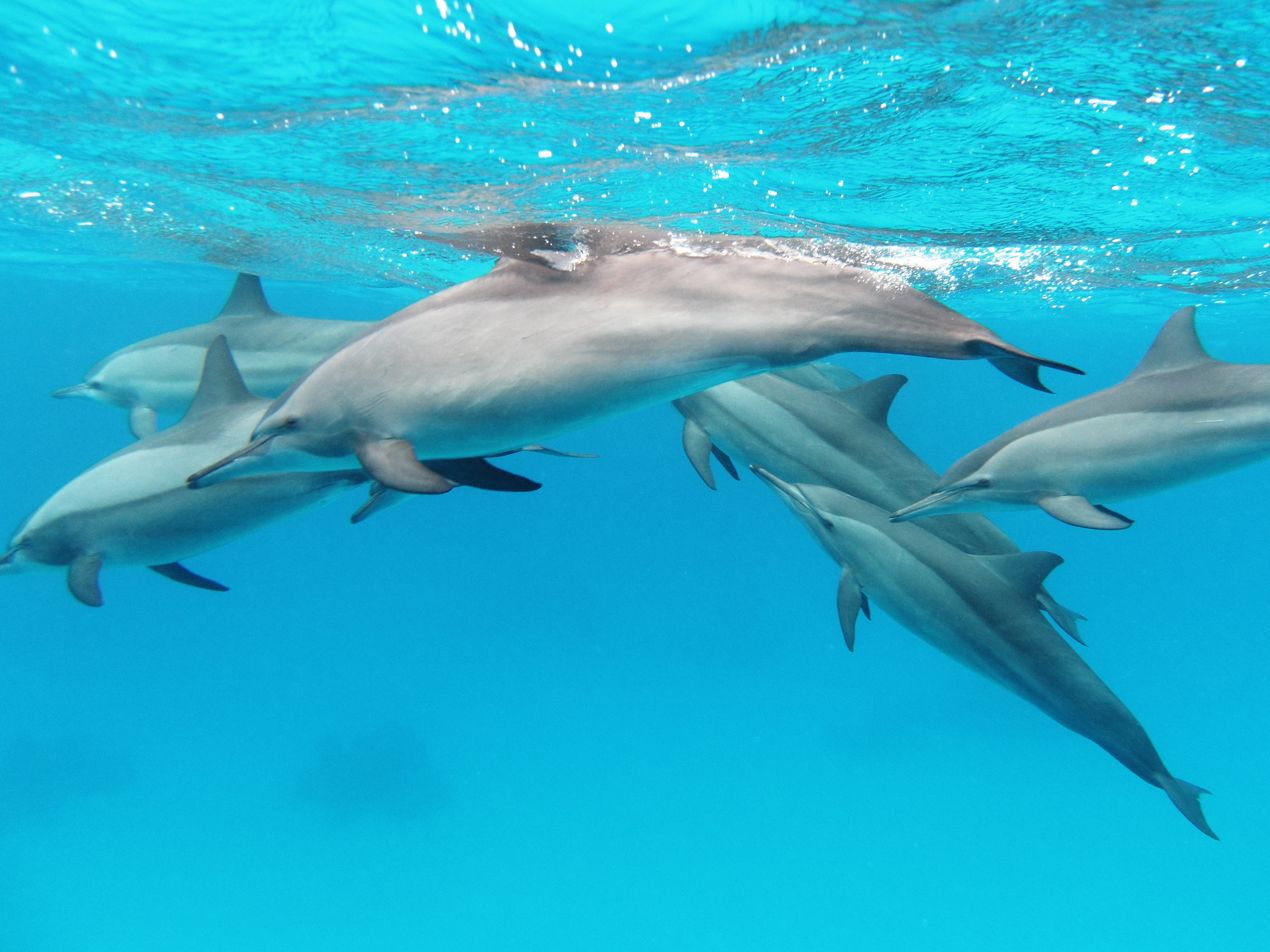
Pod of spinner dolphins

A cetacean dialect is a socially–determined vocal tradition. The complex vocal communication systems of orcas correspond with their large brains and complex social structure. The three southern resident orca pods share some calls with one another, and also have unique calls. Discussing the function of resident orca dialects, researchers John Ford, Graeme Ellis and Ken Balcomb wrote, "It may well be that dialects are used by the whales as acoustic indicators of group identity and membership, which might serve to preserve the integrity and cohesiveness of the social unit." Resident orcas form closed societies with no emigration or dispersal of individuals, and no gene flow with other orca populations. There is evidence that other species of dolphins may also have dialects.

In bottlenose dolphin studies by Wells in Sarasota, Florida, and Smolker in Shark Bay, Australia, females of a community are all linked either directly or through a mutual association in an overall social structure known as fission-fusion. Groups of the strongest association are known as "bands", and their composition can remain stable over years. There is some genetic evidence that band members may be related, but these bands are not necessarily limited to a single matrilineal line. There is no evidence that bands compete with each other. In the same research areas, as well as in Moray Firth, Scotland, males form strong associations of two to three individuals, with a coefficient of association between 70 and 100. These groups of males are known as "alliances", and members often display synchronous behaviors such as respiration, jumping, and breaching. Alliance composition is stable on the order of tens of years, and may provide a benefit for the acquisition of females for mating. The complex social strategies of marine mammals such as bottlenose dolphins, "provide interesting parallels" with the social strategies of elephants and chimpanzees.

=== Complex play ===
Dolphins are known to engage in complex play behavior, which includes such things as producing stable underwater toroidal air-core vortex rings or "bubble rings". There are two main methods of bubble ring production: rapid puffing of a burst of air into the water and allowing it to rise to the surface, forming a ring; or swimming repeatedly in a circle and then stopping to inject air into the helical vortex currents thus formed. The dolphin will often then examine its creation visually and with sonar. They also appear to enjoy biting the vortex-rings they have created, so that they burst into many separate normal bubbles and then rise quickly to the surface. Certain whales are also known to produce bubble rings or bubble nets for the purpose of foraging. Many dolphin species also play by riding in waves, whether natural waves near the shoreline in a method akin to human "body-surfing", or within the waves induced by the bow of a moving boat in a behavior known as bow riding.

=== Cross-species cooperation ===
There have been instances in captivity of various species of dolphin and porpoise helping and interacting across species, including helping beached whales. Dolphins have also been known to aid human swimmers in need, and in at least one instance a distressed dolphin approached human divers seeking assistance.

=== Creative behavior ===
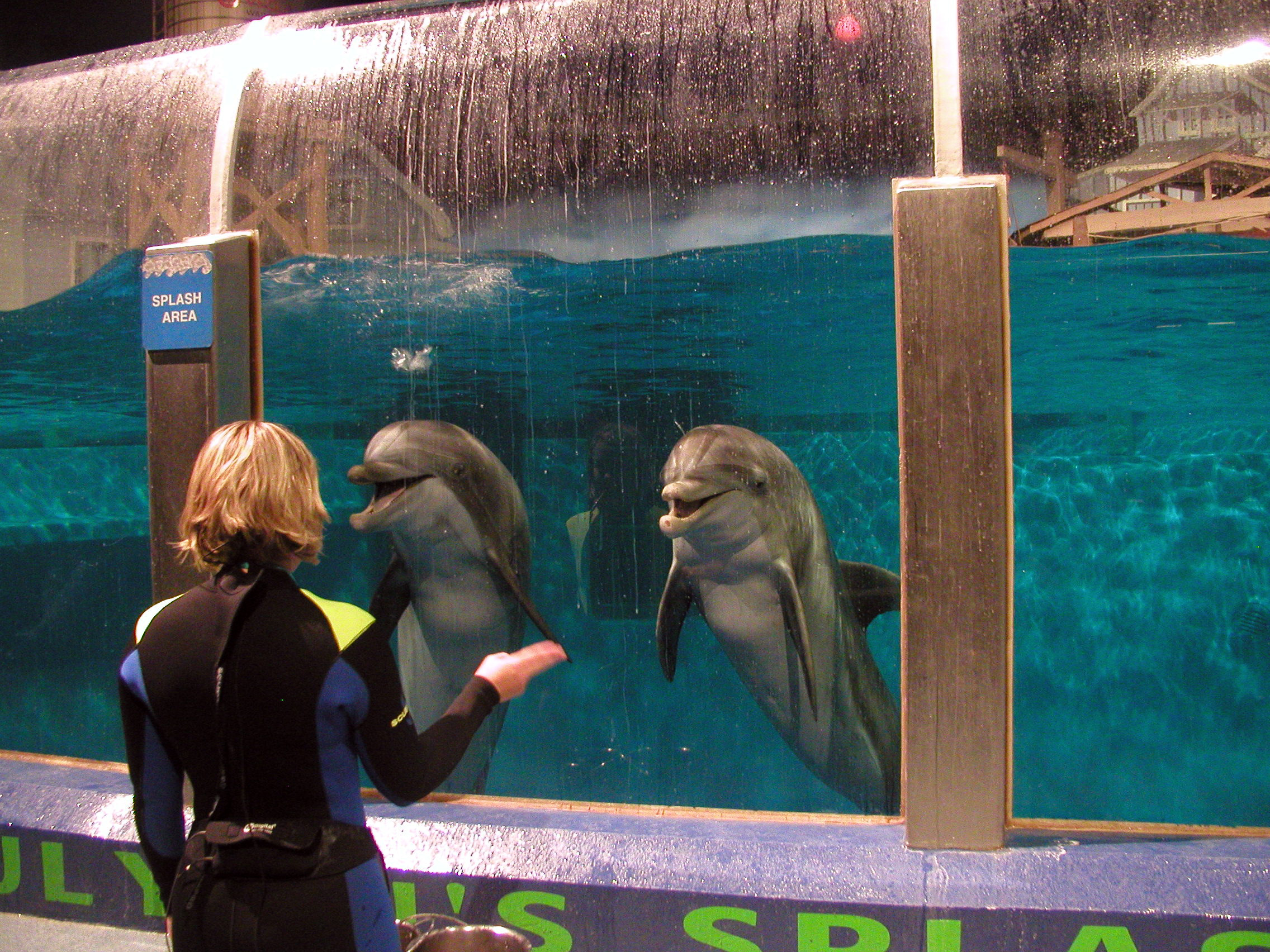
A pair of bottlenose dolphins responding to a trainer with squawking behavior

Aside from having exhibited the ability to learn complex tricks, dolphins have also demonstrated the ability to produce creative responses. This was studied by Karen Pryor in the mid-1960s at Sea Life Park, Hawaii, and was published as The Creative Porpoise: Training for Novel Behavior in 1969. The two test subjects were rough-toothed dolphins (Steno bredanensis) named Malia (a regular show performer at Sea Life Park) and Hou (a research subject at adjacent Oceanic Institute). The experiment tested when and whether the dolphins would identify that they were being rewarded (with fish) for originality in behavior and was very successful. However, since only two dolphins were involved in the experiment, the study is difficult to generalize.

Starting with Malia, the experiments method was to choose a particular behavior exhibited by her each day and reward each display of that behavior throughout the session. At the start of each new day Malia would present the prior day's behavior, but only when a new behavior was exhibited was a reward given. All behaviors exhibited were, at least for a time, known behaviors of dolphins. After approximately two weeks Malia apparently exhausted "normal" behaviors and began to repeat performances. This was not rewarded.

According to Pryor, the dolphin became almost despondent. However, at the sixteenth session without novel behavior, the researchers were presented with a flip they had never seen before. This was reinforced. As related by Pryor, after the new display: "instead of offering that again she offered a tail swipe we'd never seen; we reinforced that. She began offering us all kinds of behavior that we hadn't seen in such a mad flurry that finally we could hardly choose what to throw fish at".

The second test subject, Hou, took thirty-three sessions to reach the same stage. On each occasion the experiment was stopped when the variability of dolphin behavior became too complex to make further positive reinforcement meaningful.

The same experiment was repeated with humans, and it took the volunteers about the same length of time to figure out what was being asked of them. After an initial period of frustration or anger, the humans realised they were being rewarded for novel behavior. In dolphins this realisation produced excitement and more and more novel behaviors – in humans it mostly just produced relief.

Captive orcas have displayed responses indicating they get bored with activities. For instance, when Paul Spong worked with the orca Skana, he researched her visual skills. However, after performing favorably in the 72 trials per day, Skana suddenly began consistently getting every answer wrong. Spong concluded that a few fish were not enough motivation. He began playing music, which seemed to provide Skana with much more motivation.

At the Institute for Marine Mammal Studies in Mississippi, it has also been observed that the resident dolphins seem to show an awareness of the future. The dolphins are trained to keep their own tank clean by retrieving rubbish and bringing it to a keeper, to be rewarded with a fish. However, one dolphin, named Kelly, has apparently learned a way to get more fish, by hoarding the rubbish under a rock at the bottom of the pool and bringing it up one small piece at a time.

=== Use of tools ===
As of 1984, scientists have observed wild bottlenose dolphins in Shark Bay, Western Australia using a basic tool. When searching for food on the sea floor, many of these dolphins were seen tearing off pieces of sponge and wrapping them around their rostra, presumably to prevent abrasions and facilitate digging.

Bottlenose dolphins are one of only three species, along with humans and sea otters, among which individual-level specialization in tool use is documented. Genomic analyses indicate that the RELN gene, which encodes the reelin protein and modulates synaptic plasticity and long-term potentiation, has been under positive selection among both bottlenose dolphins and sea otters, but not among river otters. The authors suggest that the maternally and socially transmitted variation in foraging behavior and tool use displayed by both sea otters and bottlenose dolphins might be linked to genetic adaptations for increased memory and learning abilities.

== Communication ==
Audiovisual material of a humpback whale singing while diving

Whales use a variety of sounds for their communication and sensation. Odontocete (toothed whale) vocal production is classified in three categories: clicks, whistles, and pulsed calls:

- Clicks are very brief vocal sounds produced in rapid series for echolocation. Echoes of the clicks contain sound data about the surroundings transmitted through the ears to the brain, which is able to resolve echoes into information.
- Whistles – narrow-band frequency modulated (FM) signals – are used for communicative purposes, such as contact calls, or the signature whistle of bottlenose dolphins. Whistles are the primary social vocalization among the majority of Delphinidae species.

Vocalizations of Southern Alaskan Resident Orcas

Orca calls and echolocation

Call of an orca

Orca echolocation

- Pulsed calls are significant for a few cetacean species, such as the narwhal, and the orca. These calls have distinct tonal qualities and a complex harmonic structure. Typically 0.5–1.5 s in duration, they are the primary social vocalization of orcas. Researchers John Ford, Graeme Ellis, and Ken Balcomb wrote, "By varying the timbre and frequency structure of the calls, the whales can generate a variety of signals…Most calls contain sudden shifts or rapid sweeps in pitch, which give them distinctive qualities recognizable over distance and background noise."

There is strong evidence that some specific whistles, called signature whistles, are used by dolphins to identify and/or call each other; dolphins have been observed emitting both other specimens' signature whistles, and their own. A unique signature whistle develops quite early in a dolphin's life, and it appears to be created in imitation of the signature whistle of the dolphin's mother. Imitation of the signature whistle seems to occur only among the mother and her young, and among befriended adult males.

Xitco reported the ability of dolphins to eavesdrop passively on the active echolocative inspection of an object by another dolphin. Herman calls this effect the "acoustic flashlight" hypothesis, and may be related to findings by both Herman and Xitco on the comprehension of variations on the pointing gesture, including human pointing, dolphin postural pointing, and human gaze, in the sense of a redirection of another individual's attention, an ability which may require theory of mind.

The environment where dolphins live makes experiments much more expensive and complicated than for many other species; additionally, the fact that cetaceans can emit and hear sounds (which are believed to be their main means of communication) in a range of frequencies much wider than humans can means that sophisticated equipment, which was scarcely available in the past, is needed to record and analyse them. For example, clicks can contain significant energy in frequencies greater than 110 kHz (for comparison, it is unusual for a human to be able to hear sounds above 20 kHz), requiring that equipment have a sampling rates of at least 220 kHz; MHz-capable hardware is often used.

In addition to the acoustic communication channel, the visual modality is also significant. The contrasting pigmentation of the body may be used, for example with "flashes" of the hypopigmented ventral area of some species, as can the production of bubble streams during signature whistling. Also, much of the synchronous and cooperative behaviors, as described in the Behavior section of this entry, as well as cooperative foraging methods, likely are managed at least partly by visual means.

Experiments have shown that they can learn human sign language and can use whistles for 2-way human–animal communication. Phoenix and Akeakamai, bottlenose dolphins, understood individual words and basic sentences like "touch the frisbee with your tail and then jump over it". Phoenix learned whistles, and Akeakamai learned sign language. Both dolphins understood the significance of the ordering of tasks in a sentence.

A study conducted by Jason Bruck of the University of Chicago showed that bottlenose dolphins can remember whistles of other dolphins they had lived with after 20 years of separation. Each dolphin has a unique whistle that functions like a name, allowing the marine mammals to keep close social bonds. The new research shows that dolphins have the longest memory yet known in any species other than humans.

== Self-awareness ==
Self-awareness, though not well defined scientifically, is believed to be the precursor to more advanced processes like meta-cognitive reasoning (thinking about thinking) that are typical of humans. Scientific research in this field has suggested that bottlenose dolphins, alongside elephants and great apes, possess self-awareness.

The most widely used test for self-awareness in animals is the mirror test, developed by Gordon Gallup in the 1970s, in which a temporary dye is placed on an animal's body, and the animal is then presented with a mirror.

In 1995, Marten and Psarakos used television to test dolphin self-awareness. They showed dolphins real-time footage of themselves, recorded footage, and another dolphin. They concluded that their evidence suggested self-awareness rather than social behavior. While this particular study has not yet been repeated, dolphins have since passed the mirror test. However, some researchers have argued that evidence for self-awareness has not been convincingly demonstrated.

== See also ==
- Animal cognition
- Animal consciousness
- Morgan's Canon
- John C. Lilly – pioneer researcher in human–dolphin communication.
- Louis Herman – scientist in dolphin cognition and sensory abilities
- Animal language
- Vocal learning
- Spindle neuron
- Military dolphin
- U.S. Navy Marine Mammal Program
- So Long, and Thanks for All the Fish – fiction novel which derives its title from the idea of dolphins leaving the Earth.
- Uplift Universe – a series of novels, involving genetically-enhanced ("uplifted") intelligent dolphins
- Pig intelligence
