= Children of Ruin =

2019 science fiction novel by Adrian Tchaikovsky

- First edition
- Author: Adrian Tchaikovsky
- Language: English
- Genre: Science fiction Space opera
- Publisher: Tor UK
- Publication date: 2019 (paperback)
- Publication place: UK
- Media type: Print (hardcover and paperback)
- Pages: 597
- ISBN: 978-0-3164-5253-3
- Preceded by: Children of Time
- Followed by: Children of Memory

Children of Ruin is a 2019 science fiction novel by British author Adrian Tchaikovsky, the second in his Children of Time series. The novel was well received, winning the 2019 BSFA Award for Best Novel.

The book was followed by the third book in the series, Children of Memory, in 2022, and the fourth book, Children of Strife, in 2026.

== Plot ==
In the far future, humanity spreads out into the stars with the aim of terraforming other worlds for future colonization. In one star system, two potentially habitable planets are found by the terraformers, who name the first Nod and the second Damascus. On Nod, new alien life is discovered, and so plans to terraform the planet are put on hold to preserve the new life, and one of the terraformers, named Disra Senkovi, is sent to Damascus to terraform it. Before the crew can share their discovery with the rest of the world, growing conflicts between pro-science and anti-science factions escalate until Earth is left barren and the spacefaring terraformers left stranded. Senkovi introduces genetically "uplifted" octopuses (using the nanovirus from the first book to accelerate their intelligence) to the ocean planet, intending to use them as an underwater labor force.

On Nod, the terraformers discover a microscopic, cell-mimicking parasite capable of absorbing memories and learning. The parasite believes it is saving its hosts by absorbing them into its collective mind, and is driven by a singular need to explore and gain more understanding. After the parasite quickly infects the Nod crew, it pilots a ship to Damascus, intending to infect it under the guise of exploration. Senkovi senses the danger and shoots down the shuttle, burying it in the seabed, sealing the parasite within the confines of the shuttle. Senkovi lives an unnaturally long life, watching as his beloved octopuses evolve into a highly-intelligent civilization far beyond his imagination. Before dying, Senkovi marks the parasite crash site with several danger markers to prevent the octopuses from disturbing it.

Thousands of years later, an expedition consisting of humans, Portiid spiders, and an uploaded hybrid-organic AI version of the original spacefaring pioneer Avrana Kern set out towards Damascus following a radio signal from the octopus civilization hoping to connect to another branch in humanity's legacy. In the intervening years, the octopus civilization has fractured due to overpopulation on Damascus leading to a desperate octopus disturbing the Nodan crash site, releasing the contained parasite. The parasite quickly destroys life on Damascus, leaving the remaining octopuses stranded in space.

The Human-Portiid Expedition struggles to communicate with the octopuses due to octopus intelligence being decentralized, and the octopus civilization shoots down the expedition's scout ship onto the surface of Nod. There, the parasite infects a neuro-enhanced human named Meshner, who has an implant capable of interfacing with Portiid "understandings." Meanwhile, the Expedition establishes makeshift communication channels with the octopuses, preventing further hostilities. The parasite attacks the downed scout ship with the intention of infecting its crew, but the Kern AI uses Meshner's implant as a bridge to make the parasite understand that infecting and homogenizing everything it counters will inherently result in there being nothing left to explore. Stunned by this logic, the parasite agrees to a truce and the imminent threat to the octopuses and the expedition is averted.

Some time later, a multi-species alliance of Humans, Portiids, Octopuses, and the Nodan Parasite set out into the deeper parts of space (after Portiid bio-technology and octopus engineering combines to invent superluminal travel), ready to embark on a true, shared adventure.

== Reception ==
The book was met with critical acclaim. Writing for Locus, Paul Di Filippo said that "Tchaikovsky performs all the wonders of the first book, while at the same time making some quantum jumps in his sequel". The Fantasy Hive writer T. O. Munro felt the novel "is as vividly colourful as an octopus in the throes of emotion". Likewise, Three Crows Magazine writer Olivia Hofer wrote "Children of Ruin is a truly original, evolution-based science fiction novel unlike any other", but said that "despite being a gripping sequel, is very similar to its predecessor. Perhaps too similar".

=== Accolades ===
Children of Ruin won the BSFA Award for Best Novel in 2019.
