= Louis Herman =

American marine biologist

Louis Herman (April 16, 1930 – August 3, 2016) was an American marine biologist. He was a researcher of dolphin sensory abilities, dolphin cognition, and humpback whales. He was professor in the Department of Psychology and a cooperating faculty member of the Department of Oceanography at the University of Hawaiʻi at Mānoa. He founded the Kewalo Basin Marine Mammal Laboratory (KBMML) in Honolulu, Hawaii in 1970 to study bottlenose dolphin perception, cognition, and communication. In 1975, he pioneered the scientific study of the annual winter migration of humpback whales into Hawaiian waters. Together with Adam Pack, he founded The Dolphin Institute in 1993, a non-profit corporation dedicated to dolphins and whales through education, research, and conservation.

Herman served as a member of the Sanctuary Advisory Council for the Hawaiian Islands Humpback Whale National Marine Sanctuary. In total, he has published over 120 scientific papers.

== Dolphin research ==
Herman is most known for his research into sensory perception, animal language and echolocation, and more recently on the topic of imitation. The Atlantic bottlenosed dolphins involved in the research programs were Puka, Kea, Akeakamai, Phoenix, Elele, and Hiapo. Akeakamai is perhaps the best-known of the "language" dolphins, and was inserted as a character in David Brin's science fiction novel Startide Rising. In the Hawaiian language, Akeakamai roughly corresponds to: lover (ake) of wisdom (akamai).

=== Animal language ===
His 1984 paper on animal language (Herman, Richards, and Wolz, 1984) was published in the human psychology journal Cognition, during the anti-animal language backlash generated by the skeptical critique of primate animal language programs by Herbert Terrace in 1979. The key difference with previous primate work was that the dolphin work focused on language comprehension only. The problem with researching language production was the issue of scientific parsimony: it is essentially impossible to verify that an animal truly understands its own artificial language production. This problem is eliminated with language comprehension studies, because the researchers control the form of the artificial language, and need only observe the behavior of the animal in response to the symbol sequence. Other controls included the use of a blinded observer who was not aware of the sentence given to the dolphin, as well as the balanced presentation of possible word/symbol combinations. Most importantly, the dolphins were tested on their responses to novel sentences they had never before been given, to test for concept generalization. Also, the dolphins were tested in novel sentence grammars and anomalous grammars as well, demonstrating that the dolphins' comprehension was not limited to a finite-state (slot-based) syntax.

The dolphins in this research were named Akeakamai, and Phoenix.

=== Echolocation ===
Pack and Herman (1995) demonstrated the bottlenosed dolphin's ability to recognize the shapes of novel objects across the senses of echolocation and vision. In other words, if the dolphin viewed an unfamiliar object visually, it could recognize that same object and pick it out amongst dissimilar alternatives when presented to the echoic sense only through the use of an "anechoic chamber", a box submerged underwater with a window of black acrylic glass that is opaque to light, but transparent to echolocation. The objects used for generalization trials were controlled for overall size (and therefore echo strength) and composition (all objects were constructed of PVC). These abilities were measured to be equally strong in both directions, echoic-to-visual, and visual-to-echoic. The dolphin used in this research was named Elele.

=== Humpback whale ===
In 1975, Herman pioneered the scientific study of the annual winter migration of humpback whales into Hawaiian waters, focusing on distribution, abundance, behavior, social organization, song, and individual life histories. He coined the term "escort" to designate male whale(s) trailing a mother-calf pair in the wintering waters. He was one of the first researchers to collect a photographic catalog of individually identifying tail flukes in the Pacific Ocean.

In 1985, an errant humpback whale, dubbed "Humphrey" by national television media, swam up the Sacramento River in California from San Francisco Bay. Herman's idea was to lure it out by playing acoustic recordings of vocalizations from the whales' summer feeding grounds in Alaska.

=== Cognition and communication ===
Herman has also published on the following topics in animal cognition and dolphin intelligence: acoustic mimicry, behavioral mimicry (inter- and intra-specific), memory, monitoring of self behaviors (including reporting on these, as well as avoiding or repeating them), reporting on the presence and absence of objects, object categorization, discrimination and matching (identity matching to sample, delayed matching to sample, arbitrary matching to sample, synchronous creative behaviors between two animals, and comprehension of symbols for various body parts, and the comprehension of the pointing gesture and gaze (as made by dolphins or humans).

=== Vision ===
Conventional wisdom in the 1970s once dictated that dolphins were acoustic specialists, and that visual perception was relatively poor. Herman et al. (1975) hypothesized that the double-slit pupil shape enabled useful focusing in both underwater and in-air use, despite the difference in density of these media: the lens was used for focusing underwater, whereas the double-slit pupil, when contracted in the bright above-water environment, acted to focus via small aperture, essential in the same manner as a pinhole-camera. Herman et al. (1989) demonstrated the dolphin's equivalent ability in matching-to-sample (MTS) tasks in both the acoustic and visual domains. Pack and Herman (1995) explored cross-modal matching of objects between echolocation and vision, and did not report differential performance ability when comparing the visual-to-echoic and echoic-to-visual directions.

=== Video media ===
Herman's research has been featured in: National Geographic's Dolphins with Robin Williams, BBC's Wildlife on One's Dolphins: Deep Thinkers with David Attenborough, ABC's Touched by a Dolphin with Sharon Lawrence, The Discoverers IMAX, Dolphins IMAX, and NOVA.

Listings in Internet Movie Database

- Louis Herman at IMDb
- Dolphins (2000)
- In the Wild: Dolphins with Robin Williams (1997, 2005) Amazon.com
- Touched by a Dolphin (1996)
- The Discoverers (1993)

=== Selected scientific publications ===
1. Mercado III, E., Herman, L. M., Pack, A. A. (2005). Song copying by humpback whales: Themes and variations. Animal Cognition. 8, 93-102.
2. Pack, A.A., Herman, L.M. (2004). Dolphins (Tursiops truncatus) comprehend the referent of both static and dynamic human gazing and pointing in an object choice task. Journal of Comparative Psychology. 118, 160-171.
3. Mercado, E. III, Herman, L. M., Pack, A. A. (2003). Stereotypical sound patterns in humpback whale songs: usage and function. Aquatic Mammals, 29, 37-52.
4. Herman, L. M. (2002). Vocal, social, and self-imitation by bottlenosed dolphins. In C. Nehaniv and K. Dautenhahn (Eds.). Imitation in Animals and Artifacts. pp. 63–108. Cambridge, MA. MIT Press
5. Herman, L. M., Matus, D., Herman, E.Y.K., Ivancic, M., Pack, A. A. (2001). The bottlenosed dolphin's (Tursiops truncatus) understanding of gestures as symbolic representations of body parts. Animal Learning & Behavior, 29, 250-264.
6. Calambokidis, J., Steiger, G. H., Straley, J. M., Herman, L. M., Cerchio, S., Salden, D. R., Urban R., J., Jacobsen, J. K., von Ziegesar, O., Balcomb, K. C., Gabriele, C. M., Dahlheim, M. E., Uchida, S., Ellis, G., Miyamura, Y., De Guevara P., P. L., Yamaguchi, M., Sato, F., Mizroch, S. A., Schlender, L., Rasmussen, K., Barlow, J., and Quinn II, T. J. (2001). Movements and population structure of humpback whales in the North Pacific. Marine Mammal Science 17, 769-794.
7. Pack, A. A. and Herman L. M. (1995). Sensory integration in the bottlenosed dolphin: Immediate recognition of complex shapes across the senses of echolocation and vision. Journal of the Acoustical Society of America, 98, 722-733.
8. Herman, L. M. (1994). Hawaiian Humpback Whales and ATOC: A Conflict of Interests. The Journal of Environment and Development, 3, 63-76.
9. Herman, L.M., Kuczaj, S. A. II, and Holder, M. D. (1993). Responses to Anomalous Gestural Sequences by a Language-Trained Dolphin: Evidence for Processing of Semantic Relations and Syntactic Information. Journal of Experimental Psychology, General, 122, 184-194.
10. Herman, L. M., Hovancik, J.R., Gory, J.D., Bradshaw, G.L. (1989). Generalization of visual matching by a bottlenosed dolphin (Tursiops truncatus): Evidence for invariance of cognitive performance with visual or auditory materials. Journal of Experimental Psychology: Animal Behavior Processes, 15, 124-136.
11. Herman, L. M. and Forestell, P. H. (1985). Reporting presence or absence of named objects by a language-trained dolphin. Neuroscience and Bioehavioral Reviews, 9, 667-691.
12. Herman, L. M., Richards, D. G., and Wolz, J. P. (1984). Comprehension of sentences by bottlenosed dolphins. Cognition, 16, 129-219.
13. Richards, D. G., Wolz, J. P., and Herman, L. M. (1984). Vocal mimicry of computer generated sounds and vocal labeling of objects by a bottlenosed dolphin, Tursiops truncatus. Journal of Comparative Psychology, 98, 10-28.
14. Herman, L. M. (1989) In which Procrustean bed does the sea lion sleep tonight? Psychological Record, 39, 19-49.
15. Mobley, J. R., Jr., Herman, L. M., and Frankel, A. S. (1988) Responses of wintering humpback whales (Megaptera novaeangliae) to playback of recordings of winter and summer vocalizations and synthetic sound. Behavioral Ecology and Sociobiology, 23, 211-223.
16. Baker, C. S., Herman, L. M., Perry, A., Lawton, W. S., Straley, J. M., Wolman, A. A., Kaufman, G. D., Winn, H. E., Hall, J. D., Reinke, J. M., and Ostman, J. (1986). Migratory movement and population structure of Humpback whales (Megaptera novaeangliae) in the Central and Eastern North Pacific. Marine Ecology Progress Series, 31, 105-119.
17. Baker, C. S. and Herman, L. M. (1984). Aggressive behavior between humpback whales (Megaptera novaeangliae) wintering in Hawaiian waters. Canadian Journal of Zoology, 62, 1922-1937.
18. Herman, L. M. and Thompson, R. K. R. (1982) Symbolic, identity, and probe delayed matching of sounds by the bottlenosed dolphin. Animal Learning & Behavior, 10, 22-34.
19. Herman, L. M. and Antinoja, R. C. (1977). Humpback whales in the Hawaiian breeding waters: Population and pod characteristics. Scientific Reports of the Whales Research Institute (Tokyo), 29, 59-85.
20. Herman, L. M., Peacock, M. F., Yunker, M. P., and Madsen, C. (1975). Bottlenosed dolphin: Double-slit pupil yields equivalent aerial and underwater diurnal acuity. Science, 189, 650-652.
21. Herman, L. M., Beach, F. A. III, Pepper, R. L., and Stalling, R. B. (1969). Learning-set formation in the bottlenose dolphin. Psychonomic Society, 14, 3, 98-99.

== See also ==
- Akeakamai
- Animal cognition
- Animal echolocation
- Animal language
- Animal training
- Bottlenose dolphin
- Cetacean intelligence
- Great Ape language
- Human–animal communication
- Humpback whale
- John C. Lilly
- Linguistics
- Operant conditioning
- Irene Pepperberg
- David Premack
- Sue Savage-Rumbaugh
