= Sundiver =

1980 science fiction novel by David Brin

- Cover of 1980 Bantam Books paperback edition
- Author: David Brin
- Language: English
- Series: Uplift Universe
- Genre: Science fiction
- Publisher: Bantam Books
- Publication date: 1980
- Publication place: United States
- Media type: Print (paperback)
- ISBN: 0-553-13312-8
- OCLC: 6182491
- Followed by: Startide Rising

Sundiver is a 1980 science fiction novel by American writer David Brin. It is the first book of his first Uplift trilogy, followed by Startide Rising in 1983 and The Uplift War in 1987.

== Background ==
The Five Galaxies are filled with alien races, all of whom were "uplifted" into sentience by another race through the use of directed breeding. As "payment" for being made sentient, the uplifted races are subservient to their uplifters for a period of time. All existing races have reached sentience through this process, and follow a common evolution in which the races become free of their uplifters, enter a period of independent power, and then fade and eventually disappear.

The arrival of a human ship at a populated star upsets the established races as humanity reached sentience on their own. This had been believed to be impossible, nothing of the sort is known in the eons-old galactic library. This leads to great arguments among the alien powers. Humanity begins to uplift other species on Earth, including chimpanzees and dolphins, but does not demand subservience.

== Plot summary ==
Jacob Demwa, who works at the center for uplift on Earth, is recovering from a tragedy at the Vanilla Space Needle where he saved the space elevator from destruction but lost his love in the process. An alien friend of Demwa's, Fagin (a Kanten), contacts Demwa and offers him a job. Initially reluctant to return to his previous life as a scientific investigator, Demwa agrees to attend a secret meeting. He learns that there are "ghosts" appearing in the Sun's chromosphere. The ghosts are without precedent in the galactic library, and they seem to be yet another self-sentient race arising in the Solar System.

Demwa agrees to come and investigate the origin and purpose of the sun-ghosts, and travels to Mercury where the sundiver project is based. With him on Mercury are Helene deSilva, an attractive station commander with whom Jacob develops a relationship over the course of the book; Fagin (a Kanten); the library representative Bubbacup, a Pila; his assistant Culla (a Pring); Dr. Dwayne Kepler (the head of the Sundiver expedition); Dr. Mildred Martine (a psychiatrist); and the exuberant journalist Peter LaRoque. The Sundiver is a spherical ship designed to approach the Sun quite closely, with living quarters on one side and a large instrumentation section on the other.

Demwa goes to the sun, and observes the sun-ghosts. There are apparently three forms. The "toroids" appear to be similar to cattle and live off of the magnetic fields in the chromosphere. Another form is an apparently intelligent variety that is seen herding toroids. Finally there is a very different anthropomorphic figure that approaches the ship but avoids the side where the instruments are located and is somewhat threatening. When a neo-chimpanzee scientist, Dr. Jeffrey, is killed on a solo mission to the sun, it seems to confirm the sun-ghosts' hostile intent. An investigation seems to implicate the reporter, LaRoque. LaRoque is then tested to determine if he is capable of murder. The test results indicate LaRoque has violent tendencies and he is incarcerated.

A third trip to the sun is undertaken, in hopes that Pila Bubbacub will be able to contact the sun-ghosts. It fails to do so, but claims to have succeeded, saying that the sun-ghosts are offended and have used psi to control LaRoque's actions. He uses a powder that blocks the ship's sensors to pretend he has dispelled the sun-ghosts because he is embarrassed by the Library's lack of data on the ghosts. Back on Mercury, Jacob discovers his trick, and reveals it, resulting in disgrace to Bubbacub and embarrassment for the Pila.

The characters go on yet another mission into the sun, this time with a laser to communicate with the sun-ghosts. They make brief contact with one of the ghosts, but then an anthropomorphic ghost appears and warns them against further exploration of the sun. While they are leaving, they discover that one of Culla's dietary supplements is a dye used in tunable lasers. Combining this with an earlier conversation about Culla's eyesight, Demwa concludes that Culla can project laser light from his eyes: he has been faking the anthropomorphic ghosts. When Culla realizes he has been discovered he retreats to the instrument side of the ship and begins disabling the equipment that propels the sunship so that it will fall into the photosphere, taking all evidence of his deception with it. The sun-ghosts use toroids to arrest the ship's fall, but eventually they give out, and the ship plummets. While Demwa and one of the crew attempt to disable Culla, Helene discovers that only the galactic technology has been sabotaged, and uses the refrigerator laser as a thruster to move the ship out of the sun. Culla is killed, and the ship eventually escapes the sun, though all but Fagin temporarily "die" of hypothermia and frostbite from the refrigerator laser. The ship's records are recovered, showing that Culla used his laser sight to discredit Bubbacub, as part of a campaign to free his species from its client status, and then to sabotage the ship when he was discovered to prevent the Pila from finding out.

Although set in the same universe as the rest of the other Uplift books, it is set a considerable amount of time before the other books, and shares none of the same characters, apart from Jacob Demwa, who is mentioned as the mentor of Tom Orley and Gillian Baskin, and Helene Alvarez (née deSilva), who is mentioned in Startide Rising as Credeiki's former captain aboard the James Cook and who appears in The Uplift War to sign a treaty with the Thennanin.

== Reception ==
Greg Costikyan reviewed Sundiver in Ares Magazine #3 and commented that "Sundiver is thought-provoking, tightly-plotted, and readable. Though Brin's human characters are rather two-dimensional and the story depends less on their interaction and development than on the setting and science, he is somewhat more competent in this area than [author James P. Hogan on Thrice Upon a Time]. All told, it is a remarkable first effort."

Dave Langford reviewed Sundiver for White Dwarf #68, and stated that "Certain characters' weird actions are performed solely to help Brin's plot: but this is a first novel. His second won the Hugo."

=== Awards and nominations ===
Sundiver was a nominee for the 1981 Locus Award in the First Novel category.

== Publication history ==
- 1980, United States, Bantam Book ISBN 978-0-553-13312-7, Pub date 1980, Paperback
- 1985, United States, Spectra ISBN 978-0-553-26982-6, Pub date 1 January 1985, Paperback
- 2001, United States, Recorded Books ISBN 978-0-7887-5330-5, Pub Date 2001, Cassette

== Translations ==
- Chinese: 太阳潜入者, 2011
- Bulgarian: Потапяне в Слънцето, 2001
- French: Jusqu'au coeur du soleil ("To the heart of the sun"), 1980
- German: Sonnentaucher ("Sun diver"), 2001
- Italian: Spedizione Sundiver ("Sundiver expedition"), 1980
- Polish: Słoneczny nurek ("Sun diver"), 1995
- Romanian: Exploratorii soarelui ("The Sun's Explorers"), 2013
- Russian: Прыжок в Солнце ("The Jump into the Sun"), 1995, 2002
- Spanish: Navegante solar ("Solar navigator"), 1993, 1994

== Reception ==
The book received a number of reviews, including:

- by Stephen P. Brown [as Steve Brown] (1980) in Heavy Metal, March 1980
- by Thomas A. Easton [as Tom Easton] (1980) in Analog Science Fiction/Science Fact, June 1980
- by Greg Costikyan (1980) in Ares, #3 July 1980
- by Jeff Frane (1981) in Locus, #241 February 1981
- by Tom A. Jones (1985) in Vector 127
- by David Langford [as Dave Langford] (1985) in White Dwarf, August 1985
