= Children of Memory (novel) =

2023 science fiction novel by Adrian Tchaikovsky

- Author: Adrian Tchaikovsky
- Language: English
- Genre: Science fiction Space opera
- Publisher: Orbit Books
- Publication date: 24 November 2022 (UK release); 31 January 2023 (US release)
- Publication place: UK
- Media type: Print (hardcover and paperback)
- Pages: 512
- ISBN: 978-0-3164-6640-0
- Preceded by: Children of Ruin
- Followed by: Children of Strife

Children of Memory is a 2022 science fiction novel by author Adrian Tchaikovsky. The novel follows the development of a mysterious colony on a hostile exoplanet, while the human civilization from the previous books encounters a society of intelligent corvids.

The novel is a sequel to Children of Time and Children of Ruin. A sequel, Children of Strife, was published in 2026. In 2023, the series was awarded (Note: Tchaikovsky has since disavowed the win due to the subsequent ballot controversy.) the Hugo Award for Best Series.

== Synopsis ==
The story is told through a highly nonlinear narrative.

In the past, the Enkidu, an arkship sent from the dying Earth (as depicted in Children of Time) arrives at the planet Imir, site of an Old Earth terraforming project. It is inhospitable, so they seed the planet with a rudimentary and extremely fragile biosphere. They also detect a faint, mysterious signal which disappears when Heorest Holt, the ship's captain, lands the only surviving shuttle on the planet's surface. Over the years, the colony expands, while advanced technologies disappear completely and society has reverted to a simplistic, agrarian lifestyle. When the shuttle itself breaks down, the majority of the colonists, still in cryogenic suspension, are stranded in orbit at the mercy of the ship's failing systems. Inevitably, after unspecified generations more have passed, society on Imir begins to collapse. Unsustainable mutations in the flora and fauna have led to an ecological catastrophe, and poor harvests have driven many farmers to poverty. Highly reactionary and xenophobic views become popular, centering around the fear of outsiders.

In the present, the exploratory vessel Skipper arrives around Imir. The crew consists of representatives from every contacted species thus far: the archetypal Portiid spiders Portia, Fabian, and Bianca, the octopus Paul, the human Jodry, and the ever-present Avrana Kern. Of note is an offshoot of the Nodan organism, Miranda, whose favored identity is a human who voluntarily allowed a copy of herself to be subsumed into the Nodan organism. New to the crew are Gothi and Gethli, sentient corvids from a world similar to Damascus, on which the Old Earth terraformers uplifted non-human intelligence to better survive the harsh conditions of a partially terraformed world. Corvid society consists of monogamous pairs with strict division of cognition. One is only capable of memorization and analysis, the other of creation and synthesis. Through communication and iteration, they appear sentient through a process similar to a generative adversarial network, although the truth remains an active question throughout the story. The Skipper explores Imir, discovering the Enkidu still in orbit, filled with the remains of the abandoned colonists. They detect both scattered radio transmissions from the colonists, and the mysterious signal. Miranda proposes and leads an expedition in which she and a team including Portia, Fabian, Bianca, and Paul can be dispatched to the planet occupying grown human bodies, to blend in and live among the colonists.

On Imir, Miranda and the others have lived among the colonists for more than a season. Miranda has taken the role of a schoolteacher, and connects with a young girl named Liff, a precocious child descended from Captain Holt. Miranda's efforts to learn the history of the colony are complicated by Liff's testimony. The girl claims to have experienced aspects of the colony far before her time, and remembers Holt as her grandfather, despite him dying many generations before. Liff herself is troubled by the inconsistencies, and takes comfort in an Old Earth storybook containing fairy tales and stories of witches. Her beliefs are strengthened when she is visited by Gothi and Gethli, impossibly able to shift between both human and corvid forms. They take her to meet the Witch, actually Kern, whom Liff believes is the one who took her grandfather. The Witch demands that Liff bring to her outsiders that do not belong in the colony in trade for her grandfather. But when Liff attempts to bring Miranda, she discovers that the increasingly xenophobic colonists have lynched the entire expedition team.

The story inexplicably resumes during the initial landing on Imir. Liff is now the true granddaughter of Heorest Holt, and the expedition team have snuck into the colony by pretending to be thawed colonists from the Enkidu. Successive chapters inexplicably jump between various stages of the colony's evolution, but always with Liff and the expedition as constants. Both Liff and Miranda are overwhelmed by residual memories of their experiences, which chaotically bleed together. Kern, as the Witch, torments Miranda by reminding her of the various individuals she subsumed before she learned the value of sentient life. Ultimately, as the expedition is seized and nearly lynched yet again, Liff brings Kern and the corvids before the townsfolk. Liff, with the help of the corvids, breaks the cycle and "frees" Miranda.

Now back aboard the Skipper, Miranda is told the truth. The mysterious signal was from a "simulation engine" buried deep within the planet. The engine made copies of the original human colony, and has repeatedly and deterministically "lived" them even after the colony collapsed. Liff was unique among the residents of the simulation, as she was the last survivor of the colony, and thus commanded all of the simulation's resources for a significant period, and thus an inordinate amount of its focus. On their initial expedition, only a copy of Miranda was made and sent down. The simulation, unprepared for the complexity of the Nodan organism, split off impressions of the other members into separate beings, and continually attempted to fit them into the simulation without success. Kern and the corvids were a rescue party, and they successfully extracted Miranda using Liff's abilities. Now that she has been removed, the simulation will be reset and Liff will become the last survivor of the doomed colony again.

Miranda and the rebellious Kern offshoot that rescued her return to the planet. They discover no ruined colony, no signs of anything. In truth, the shuttle Holt piloted had crashed on its first re-entry; the simulated colony was entirely extrapolated from the potential of the crew. The Skipper's crew now face an ethical issue; are they obligated to "save" the colonists trapped inside the simulation? Kern and Miranda also conclude that the engine is its own form of sentience, emergent from the inherent complexity of the simulated world. In the end, Miranda frees Liff, who chooses not to free the rest of her people. Instead, Liff goes back to the simulation, and reaches out to the engine itself, which reaches back.
