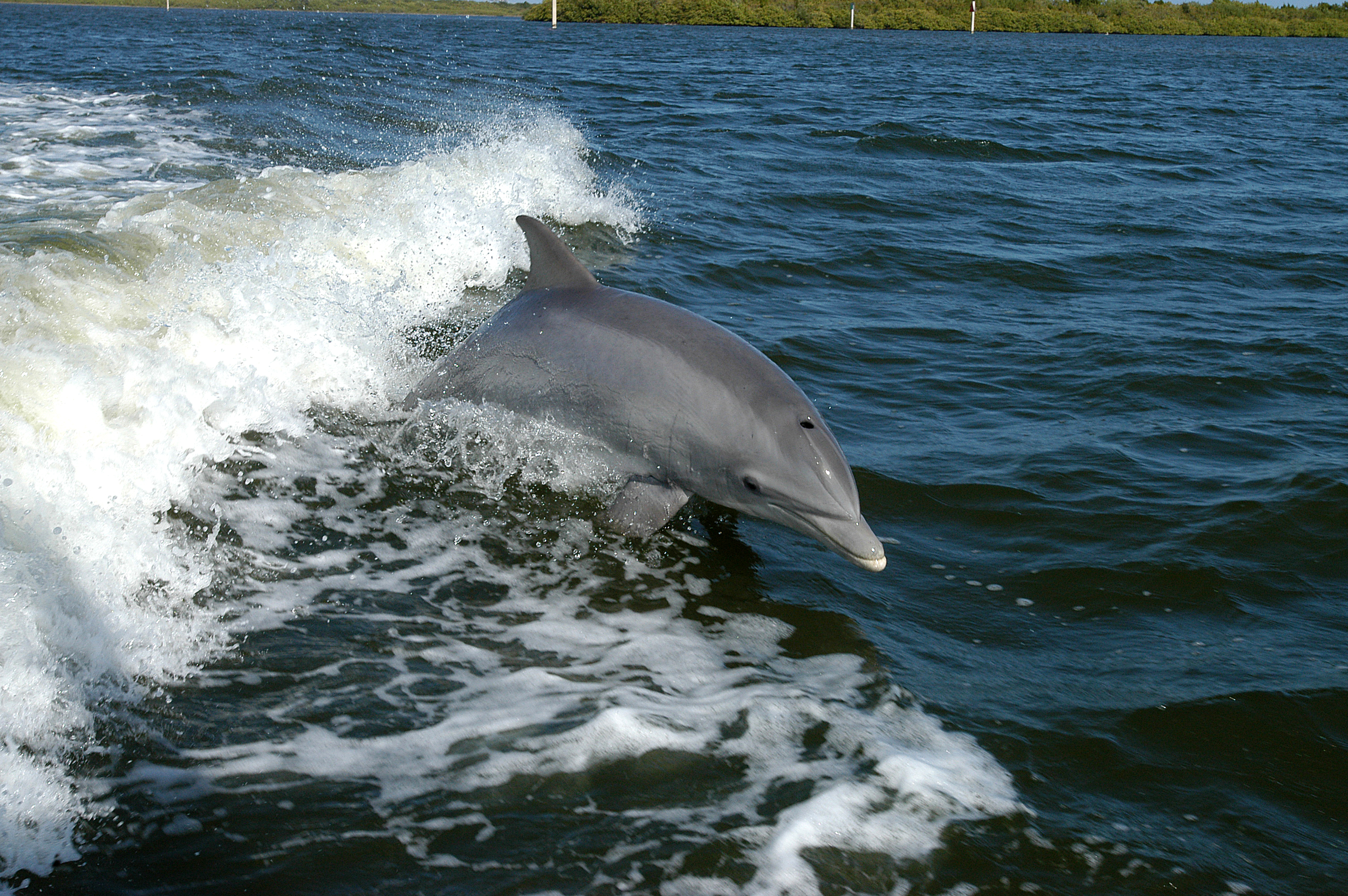
- Bottlenose dolphin surfing in the wake of a research boat
- Size compared to an average human

Scientific classification
- Kingdom: Animalia
- Phylum: Chordata
- Class: Mammalia
- Order: Artiodactyla
- Infraorder: Cetacea
- Family: Delphinidae
- Subfamily: Delphininae
- Genus: Tursiops; Gervais, 1855

Type species
- Delphinus truncatus Montagu, 1821

Species
- Tursiops truncatus Gray, 1866; Tursiops aduncus Ehrenberg, 1832; Tursiops erebennus Cope, 1865; †Tursiops astensis Sacco, 1891; †Tursiops brochii Balsamo-Crivelli, 1842; †Tursiops osennae Simonelli, 1911
- Bottlenose dolphin range (in blue)

= Bottlenose dolphin =

Bottlenose dolphin Temporal range: Miocene–Recent 3.6–0 Ma

Genus of dolphin

The bottlenose dolphin is a toothed whale in the genus Tursiops. They are common, cosmopolitan members of the family Delphinidae, the family of oceanic dolphins. Molecular studies show the genus contains three species: the common bottlenose dolphin (Tursiops truncatus), the Indo-Pacific bottlenose dolphin (Tursiops aduncus), and Tamanend's bottlenose dolphin (Tursiops erebennus). Others, like the Burrunan dolphin (Tursiops (aduncus) australis), may be alternately considered their own species or be subspecies of T. aduncus. Bottlenose dolphins inhabit warm and temperate seas worldwide, being found everywhere except for the Arctic and Antarctic Circle regions. Their name derives from the Latin tursio (dolphin) and truncatus for the truncated teeth (the type specimen was old and had worn down teeth; this is not a typical characteristic of most members of the species).

Numerous investigations of bottlenose dolphin intelligence have been conducted, examining mimicry, use of artificial language, object categorization, and self-recognition. They can use tools (sponging; using marine sponges to forage for food sources they normally could not access) and transmit cultural knowledge from generation to generation, and their considerable intelligence has driven interaction with humans. Bottlenose dolphins gained popularity from aquarium shows and television programs such as Flipper. They have also been trained by militaries to locate sea mines or detect and mark enemy divers. In some areas, they cooperate with local fishermen by driving fish into their nets and eating the fish that escape. Some encounters with humans are harmful to the dolphins: people hunt them for food, and dolphins are killed inadvertently as a bycatch of tuna fishing and by getting caught in crab traps.

Common bottlenose dolphins have an encephalization quotient of 5.26, which is even higher than chimpanzees. This more than likely contributes to their high intelligence.

== Taxonomy ==
Scientists have been long aware of the fact that the Tursiops dolphins might consist of more than one species, as there is extensive variation in color and morphology along its range. In the past, most studies used morphology to evaluate differences between and within species, but in the late 20th century, combining morphological and molecular genetics allowed much greater insight into this previously intractable problem. Since the late 1990s and early 2000s, most researchers acknowledged the existence of two species: the common bottlenose dolphin (T. truncatus), found in coastal and oceanic habitats of most tropical to temperate oceans, and the Indo-Pacific bottlenose dolphin (T. aduncus), that lives in coastal waters around India, northern Australia, South China, the Red Sea, and the eastern coast of Africa.

In 2011, a third distinct species was described, the Burrunan dolphin (T. (aduncus) australis), found in the Port Phillip and Gippsland Lakes areas of Victoria, Australia, after research showed it was distinct from T. truncatus and T. aduncus, both in morphology and genetics. Also, evidence has been accumulating to validate the existence of a separate species, Lahille's bottlenose dolphin, T. gephyreus, that occurs in coastal waters of Argentina, Uruguay and southern Brazil. Other sources accept the Pacific bottlenose dolphin (T. t. gillii or T. gillii), that inhabits the Pacific, and has a black line from the eye to the forehead. T. gillii, first described in 1873, is currently considered a junior synonym of T. truncatus. Additionally, T. nuuanu was described in 1911 for bottlenose dolphins along the Pacific coast in Central America. An analysis of T. gillii and T. nuuanu specimens supported T. gillii as a synonym of T. truncatus, while T. nuuanu was recognized as a subspecies. In general, genetic variation between populations is significant, even among nearby populations. As a result of this genetic variation, other distinct species currently considered to be populations of common bottlenose dolphin are possible.

Much of the discussion and doubts about its taxonomy is related to the existence of two ecotypes of bottlenose dolphins in many part of its distribution. For example, the two ecotypes of the common bottlenose dolphin within the western North Atlantic are represented by the shallower water or coastal ecotype and the more offshore ecotype. Their ranges overlap, but they have been shown to be genetically distinct. In 2022, Costa et al. established morphologic, genetic, and evolutionary divergence between the two ecotypes in the western North Atlantic, resurrecting Tursiops erebennus for the coastal form while the offshore form was retained in T. truncatus.

The Society for Marine Mammalogy's Committee on Taxonomy presently recognizes three species of bottlenose dolphin: T. truncatus, T. aduncus, and T. erebennus. They also recognize three subspecies of common bottlenose dolphin in addition to the nominotypical subspecies: the Black Sea bottlenose dolphin (T. t. ponticus), Lahille's bottlenose dolphin (T. t. gephyreus), and the Eastern Tropical Pacific bottlenose dolphin (T. t. nuuanu). The IUCN, on their Red List of endangered species, currently recognises only two species of bottlenose dolphins. The American Society of Mammalogists also recognizes only two species. While acknowledging the studies describing T. australis, it classifies it within T. aduncus.

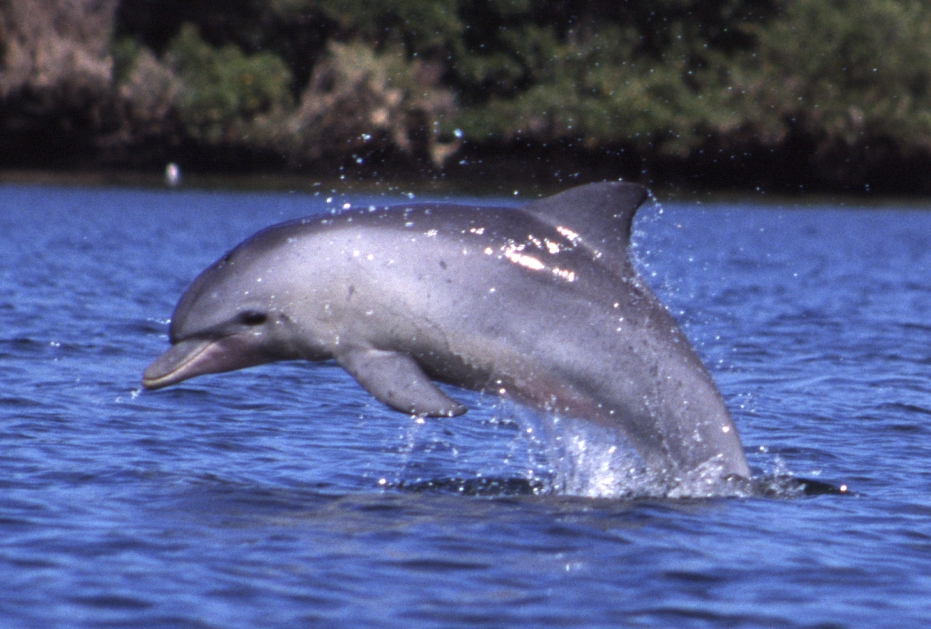
Indo-Pacific bottlenose dolphin, T. aduncus

Some recent genetic evidence suggests the Indo-Pacific bottlenose dolphin belongs in the genus Stenella, since it is more like the Atlantic spotted dolphin (Stenella frontalis) than the common bottlenose dolphin. However, more recent studies indicate that this is a consequence of reticulate evolution (such as past hybridization between Stenella and ancestral Tursiops) and incomplete lineage sorting, and thus support T. truncatus and T. aduncus belonging to the same genus.

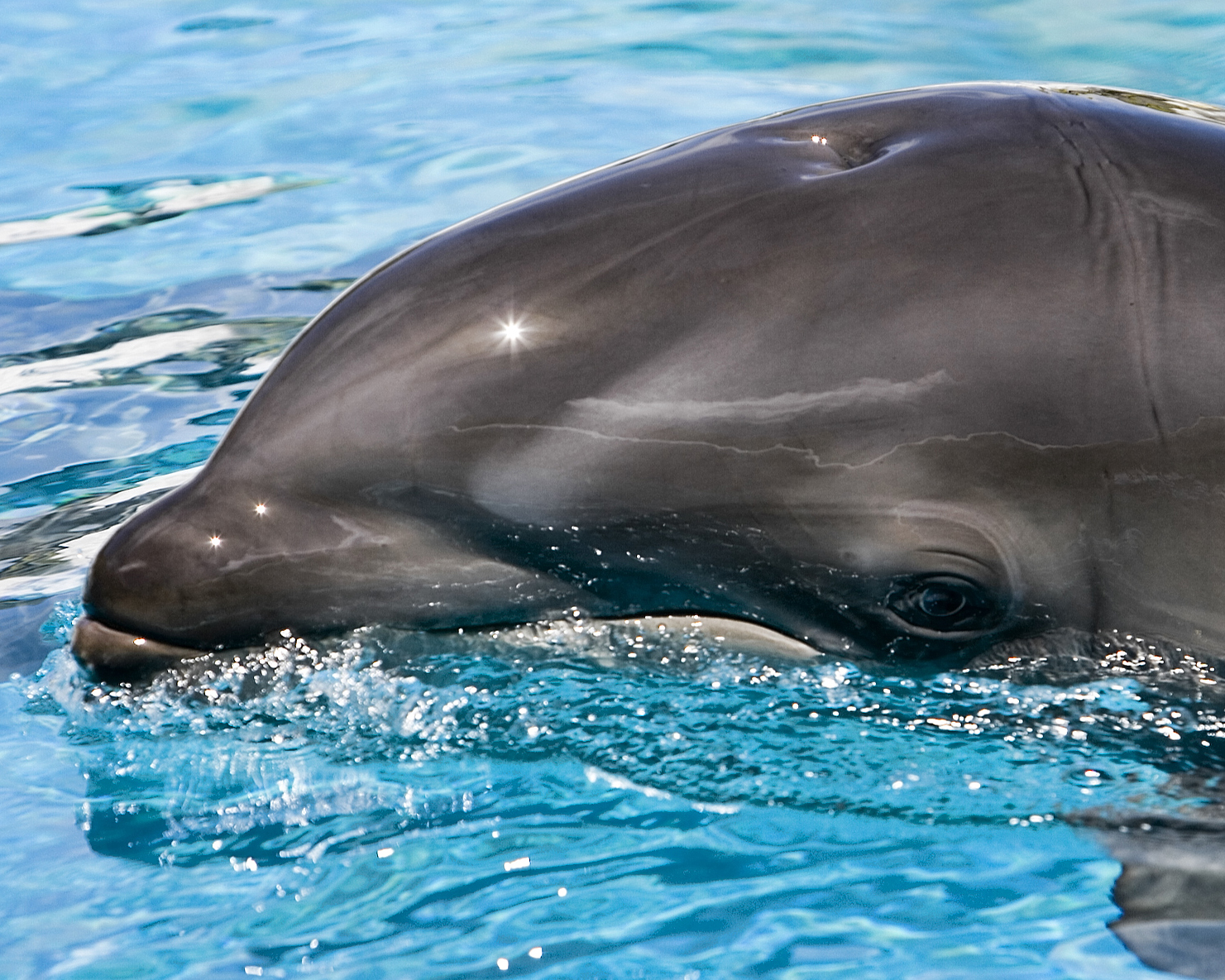
Wolphin Kawili'Kai at the Sea Life Park in Hawaii

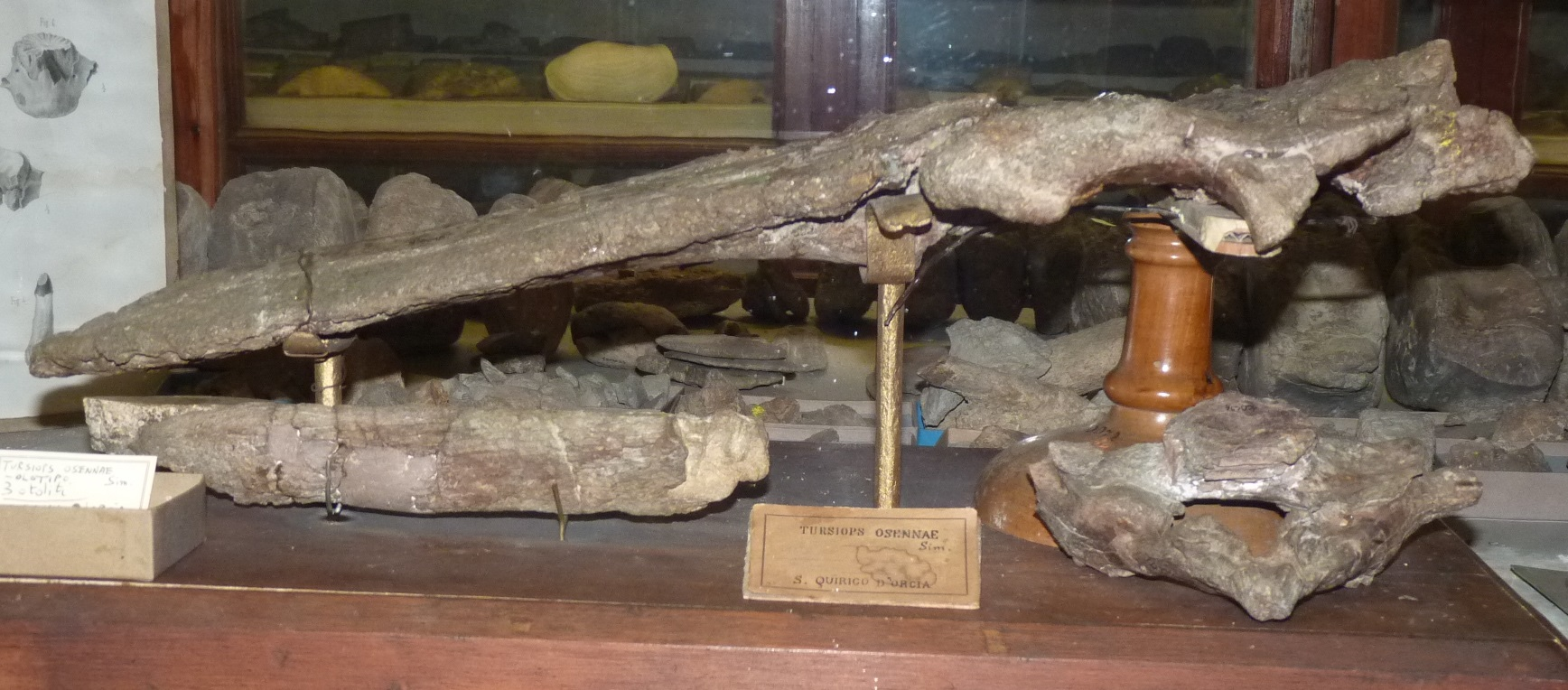
The fossil species Tursiops osennae

=== Hybrids ===
Bottlenose dolphins have been known to hybridize with other dolphin species. Hybrids with Risso's dolphin occur both in the wild and in captivity. The best known hybrid is the wholphin, a false killer whale–bottlenose dolphin hybrid. The wholphin is fertile, and two currently live at the Sea Life Park in Hawaii. The first was born in 1985 to a female bottlenose. Wholphins also exist in the wild. In captivity, a bottlenose dolphin and a rough-toothed dolphin hybridized. A common dolphin–bottlenose dolphin hybrid born in captivity lives at SeaWorld California. Other hybrids live in captivity around the world and in the wild, such as a bottlenose dolphin–Atlantic spotted dolphin hybrid.

=== Fossil species ===
Bottlenose dolphins appeared during the Miocene. Known fossil species include Tursiops osennae (late Miocene to early Pliocene) from the Piacenzian coastal mudstone, and Tursiops miocaenus (Miocene) from the Burdigalian marine sandstone, all in Italy.

== Description ==
The bottlenose dolphin weighs an average of 300 kg (660 lb), but can range from 150 and 650 kg (330 and 1,430 lb). It can reach a length of just over 4 m (13 ft). Its color varies considerably, is usually dark gray on the back and lighter gray on the flanks, but it can be bluish-grey, brownish-grey, or even nearly black, and is often darker on the back from the rostrum to behind the dorsal fin. This is called countershading and is a form of camouflage. Older dolphins sometimes have a few spots.

Bottlenose dolphins can live for more than 40 years. Females typically live 5–10 years longer than males, with some females exceeding 60 years. This extreme age is rare and less than 2% of all bottlenose dolphins will live longer than 60 years. Bottlenose dolphins can jump to a height of 6 metres (20 feet) in the air.

== Anatomy ==
Their elongated upper and lower jaws form what is called a rostrum, or snout, which gives the animal its common name. The real, functional nose is the blowhole on top of its head; the nasal septum is visible when the blowhole is open.

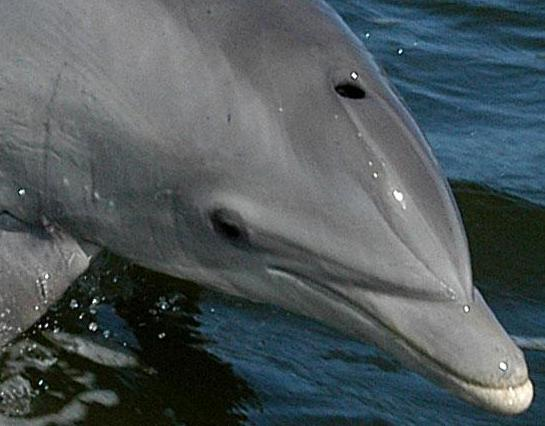
Bottlenose dolphin head, showing rostrum and blowhole

Bottlenose dolphins have 18 to 28 conical teeth on each side of each jaw.

The flukes (lobes of the tail) and dorsal fin are formed of dense connective tissue and do not contain bone or muscle. The dorsal fin usually shows phenotypic variations that help discriminate among populations. The animal propels itself by moving the flukes up and down. The pectoral flippers (at the sides of the body) are for steering; they contain bones homologous to the forelimbs of land mammals. A bottlenose dolphin discovered in Japan has two additional pectoral fins, or "hind legs", at the tail, about the size of a human's pair of hands. Scientists believe a mutation caused the ancient trait to reassert itself as a form of atavism.

Newborn dolphins are born with vibrissae, whisker-like tactile follicles mainly on the rostrum, as part of a sensory organ called the "follicle-sinus complex", which is present only during the postnatal period. The whiskers are possibly used to locate the mother's nipples.

== Physiology and senses ==
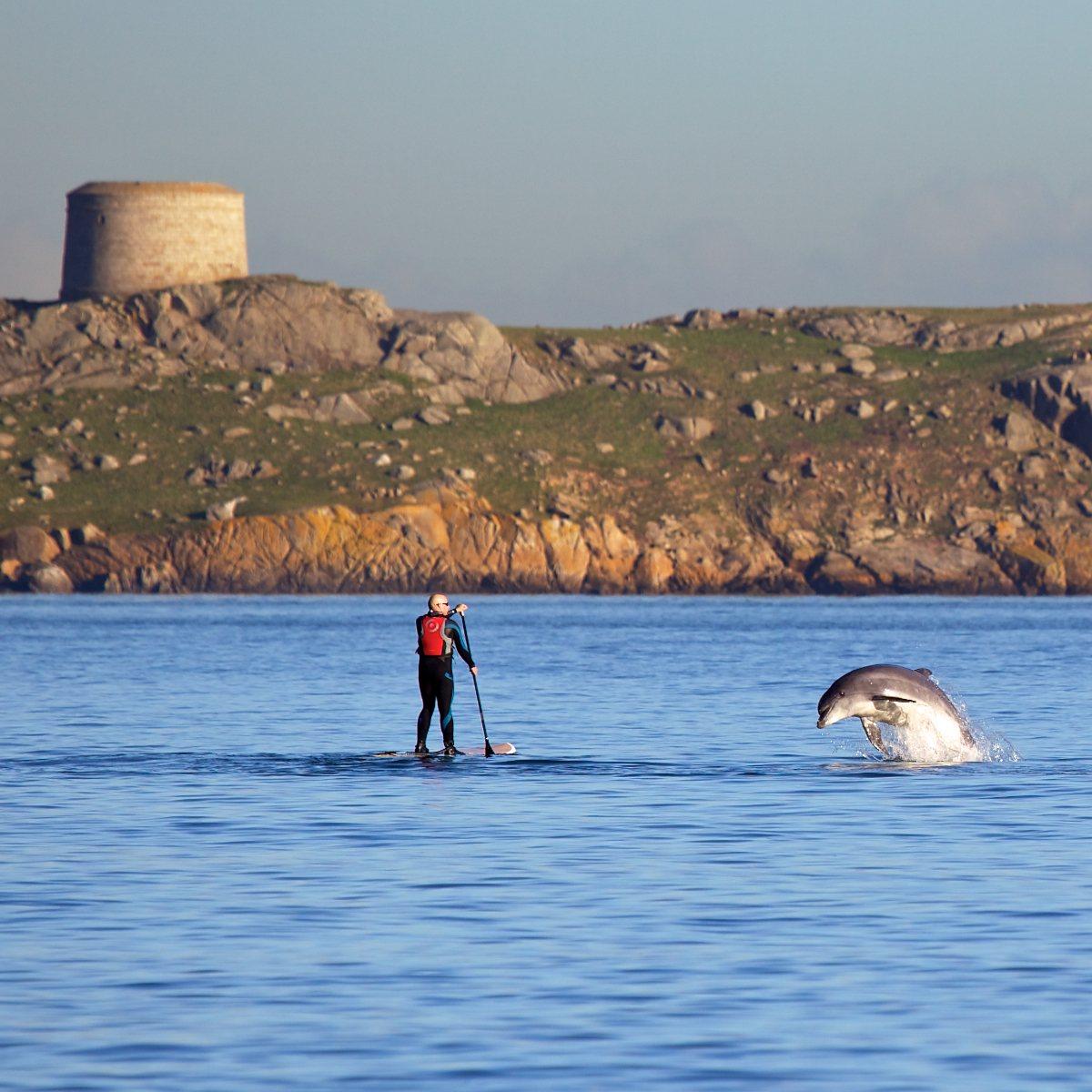
Dolphin and a paddler at Dalkey Island

In colder waters, they have more body fat and blood, and are more suited to deeper diving. Typically, 18–20% of their body weight is blubber. Most research in this area has been restricted to the North Atlantic Ocean. Bottlenose dolphins typically swim at 5 to 11 km/h (1.4 to 3.1 m/s), but are capable of bursts of up to 29 to 35 km/h (8.1 to 9.7 m/s). The higher speeds can only be sustained for a short time.

=== Senses ===
The dolphin's search for food is aided by a form of sonar known as echolocation: it locates objects by producing sounds and listening for the echoes. Clicking sounds are emitted in a focused beam in front of the dolphin. When the clicking sounds hit an object in the water, like a fish or rock, they bounce off and come back to the dolphin as echoes. Echolocation tells the dolphins the shape, size, speed, distance, and location of the object. To hear the returning echo, they have two small ear openings behind the eyes, but most sound waves are transmitted to the inner ear through the lower jaw. As the object of interest is approached, the echo becomes booming, and the dolphins adjust by decreasing the intensity of the emitted sounds. (This contrasts with bats and sonar, which reduce the sensitivity of the sound receptor.) The interclick interval also decreases as the animal nears the target. Evidently, the dolphin waits for each click's echo before clicking again. Echolocation details, such as signal strength, spectral qualities, and discrimination, are well understood by researchers. Bottlenose dolphins are also able to extract shape information, suggesting they are able to form an "echoic image" or sound picture of their targets.

They also have electroreception. The calves are born with two slender rows of whiskers along their snout, which fall off soon after birth, leaving behind a series of dimples known as vibrissal pits able to sense electric fields.

Dolphins have sharp eyesight. The eyes are located at the sides of the head and have a tapetum lucidum, or reflecting membrane, at the back of the retina, which aids vision in dim light. Their horseshoe-shaped, double-slit pupils enable dolphins to have good vision both in air and underwater, despite the different indices of refraction of these media. When under water, the eyeball's lens serves to focus light, whereas in the in-air environment, the typically bright light serves to contract the specialized pupil, resulting in sharpness from a smaller aperture (similar to a pinhole camera).

By contrast, a bottlenose's sense of smell is poor, because its blowhole, the analog to the nose, is closed when underwater and it opens only for breathing. Like other toothed whales, it has no olfactory nerves or olfactory lobe in the brain. Bottlenose dolphins are able to detect salty, sweet, bitter (quinine sulphate), and sour (citric acid) tastes, but this has not been well-studied. Anecdotally, some individuals in captivity have been noted to have preferences for food fish types, although it is not clear if taste mediates this preference.

In 2022, a study at the University of St Andrews in Scotland found that dolphins were able to identify their "friends" and family members by the taste of their urine in the water.

=== Communication ===
Bottlenose dolphins communicate through burst pulsed sounds, whistles, and body language. Examples of body language include leaping out of the water, snapping jaws, slapping the tail on the surface and butting heads. Sounds and gestures help keep track of other dolphins in the group, and alert other dolphins to danger and nearby food. Lacking vocal cords, they produce sounds using six air sacs near their blow hole. Each animal has a uniquely identifying, frequency-modulated narrow-band signature vocalization (signature whistle).

Signature whistles, which are in a higher frequency range than humans can hear, have an important role in facilitating mother–calf contact. In the Sarasota Dolphin Research Program's library of recordings were 19 female common bottlenose dolphins (Tursiops truncatus) producing signature whistles both with and without the presence of their dependent calf. In all 19 cases, the mother dolphin changed the same signature whistle when the calf was present, by reaching a higher frequency, or using a wider frequency range. Similarly, humans use higher fundamental frequencies and a wider pitch range to inflect child-directed speech (CDS). This has rarely been discovered in other species. The researchers stated that CDS benefits for humans are cueing the child to pay attention, long-term bonding, and promoting the development of lifelong vocal learning, with parallels in these bottlenose dolphins in an example of convergent evolution.

Researchers from the Bottlenose Dolphin Research Institute (BDRI), based in Sardinia (Italy) have now shown whistles and burst pulsed sounds are vital to the animals' social life and mirror their behaviors.

The tonal whistle sounds (the most melodious ones) allow dolphins to stay in contact with each other (above all, mothers and offspring), and to coordinate hunting strategies. The burst-pulsed sounds (which are more complex and varied than the whistles) are used "to avoid physical aggression in situations of high excitement", such as when they are competing for the same piece of food, for example. The dolphins emit these strident sounds when in the presence of other individuals moving towards the same prey. The "least dominant" one soon moves away to avoid confrontation.

Other communication uses about 30 distinguishable sounds, and although famously proposed by John C. Lilly in the 1950s, no "dolphin language" has been found. However, Herman, Richards, and Wolz demonstrated comprehension of an artificial language by two bottlenose dolphins (named Akeakamai and Phoenix) in the period of skepticism toward animal language following Herbert Terrace's critique.

== Intelligence ==
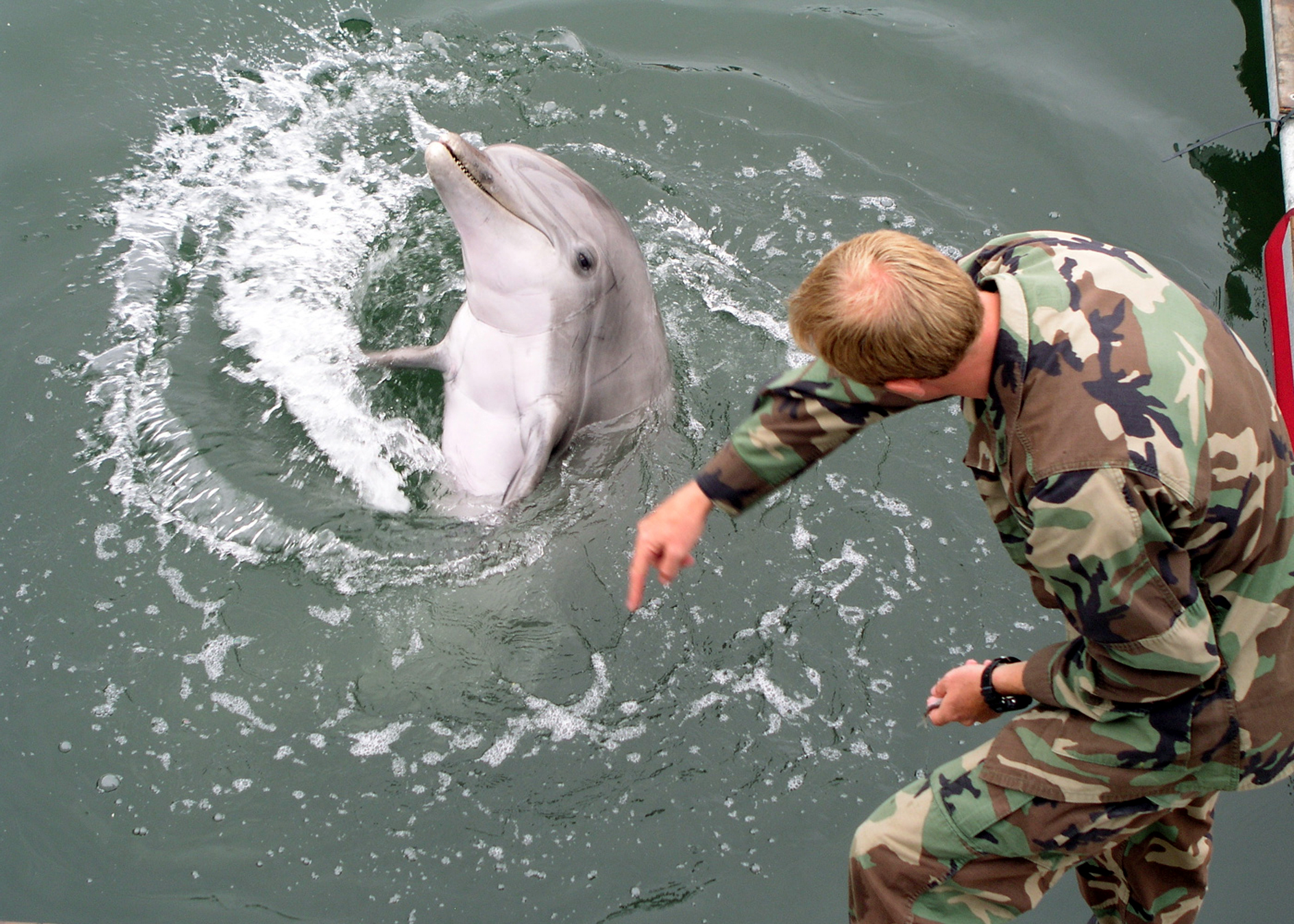
Bottlenose dolphin responding to human hand gestures

=== Cognition ===
Cognitive abilities that have been investigated include concept formation, sensory skills, and mental representations. Such research has been ongoing since the 1970s. This includes: acoustic and behavioral mimicry, comprehension of novel sequences in an artificial language, memory, monitoring of self behavior, discrimination and matching, comprehension of symbols for various body parts, comprehension of pointing gestures and gaze (as made by dolphins or humans), mirror self-recognition, and numerical values.

=== Tool use and culture ===
At least some wild bottlenose dolphins use tools. In Shark Bay, off Western Australia, dolphins place a marine sponge on their rostrum, presumably to protect it when searching for food on the sandy sea bottom. This has only been observed in this bay (first in 1997), and is predominantly practiced by females. A 2005 study showed mothers most likely teach the behavior to their offspring, evincing culture (behavior learned from other species members).

Mud plume feeding is a feeding technique performed by a small community of bottlenose dolphins over shallow seagrass beds (less than 1 m) in the Florida Keys in the United States. The behavior involves creation of a U-shaped plume of mud in the water column and then rushing through the plume to capture fish.

Along the beaches and tidal marshes of South Carolina and Georgia in the United States, bottlenose dolphins cooperatively herd prey fish onto steep and sandy banks in a practice known as "strand feeding". Groups of between two and six dolphins are regularly observed creating a bow wave to force the fish out of the water. The dolphins follow the fish, stranding themselves briefly, to eat their prey before twisting their bodies back and forth in order to slide back into the water. While initially documented in South Carolina and Georgia, strand feeding has also been observed in Louisiana, Texas, Baja California, Ecuador, and Australia.

Some Mauritanian dolphins cooperate with human fishermen. The dolphins drive a school of fish towards the shore, where humans await with nets. In the confusion of casting nets, the dolphins catch a large number of fish as well. Intraspecies cooperative foraging has also been observed. These behaviors may also be transmitted via teaching. Controversially, Rendell and Whitehead have proposed a structure for the study of cetacean culture. Similar cases have been observed in Laguna, Santa Catarina in Brazil since during 19th century as well.

Near Adelaide, in South Australia, several bottlenose dolphins "tail-walk", whereby they elevate the upper part of their bodies vertically out of the water, and propel themselves along the surface with powerful tail movements. Tail-walking mostly arises via human training in dolphinaria. In the 1980s, a female from the local population was kept at a local dolphinarium for three weeks, and the scientist suggests she copied the tail-walking behavior from other dolphins. Two other wild adult female dolphins copied it from her, and the behaviour has continued through generations until 2022.

A study conducted by the University of Chicago showed that bottlenose dolphins can remember whistles of other dolphins they had lived with after 20 years of separation. Each dolphin has a unique whistle that functions like a name, allowing the marine mammals to keep close social bonds. The new research shows that dolphins have the longest memory yet known in any species other than humans.

The bottlenose dolphins of John's Pass in Boca Ciega Bay, St. Petersburg, Florida, exhibit a rare form of self-decoration and social object use called grass-wearing. Self-decoration by wearing grass appears to be an attention-getting device rather than purely play and varies from a single blade to large clusters of grass. John's Pass dolphins self-decorate with grass primarily when they form new social groups or engage in procreative activities. Grass-wearing behavior among these dolphins is a local behavioral tradition that could constitute a cultural difference from other communities.

=== Cortical neurons ===
Some researchers hypothesize that the number of nerve cells (neurons) in the cortex of the brain predicts intelligence in mammals. A 2019 study estimated the number of neurons in the cerebral cortex of three common bottlenose dolphins and found numbers ranging from 11.7 to 15.2 billion neurons. The human average being approximately 16 billion, this is likely within the range found in the human population.

== Life history ==
Bottlenose dolphins have a lifespan of 40–60 years. Females can outlive males and live for 60 years or more. Dolphins start to reproduce aged 5 to 15 years.

=== Respiration and sleep ===
The bottlenose dolphin has a single blowhole located on the dorsal surface of the head consisting of a hole and a muscular flap. The flap is closed during muscle relaxation and opens during contraction. Dolphins are voluntary breathers, who must deliberately surface and open their blowholes to get air. They can store almost twice as much oxygen in proportion to their body weight as a human can: the dolphin can store 36 milliliters (ml) of oxygen per kg of body weight, compared with 20 ml per kg for humans. This is an adaptation to diving. The bottlenose dolphin typically rises to the surface to breathe through its blowhole two to three times per minute, although it can remain submerged for up to 20 minutes.

Dolphins can breathe while "half-asleep". During the sleeping cycle, one brain hemisphere remains active, while the other hemisphere shuts down. The active hemisphere handles surfacing and breathing behavior. The daily sleeping cycle lasts for about 8 hours, in increments of minutes to hours. During the sleeping cycle, they remain near the surface, swimming slowly or "logging", and occasionally closing one eye.

=== Reproduction ===
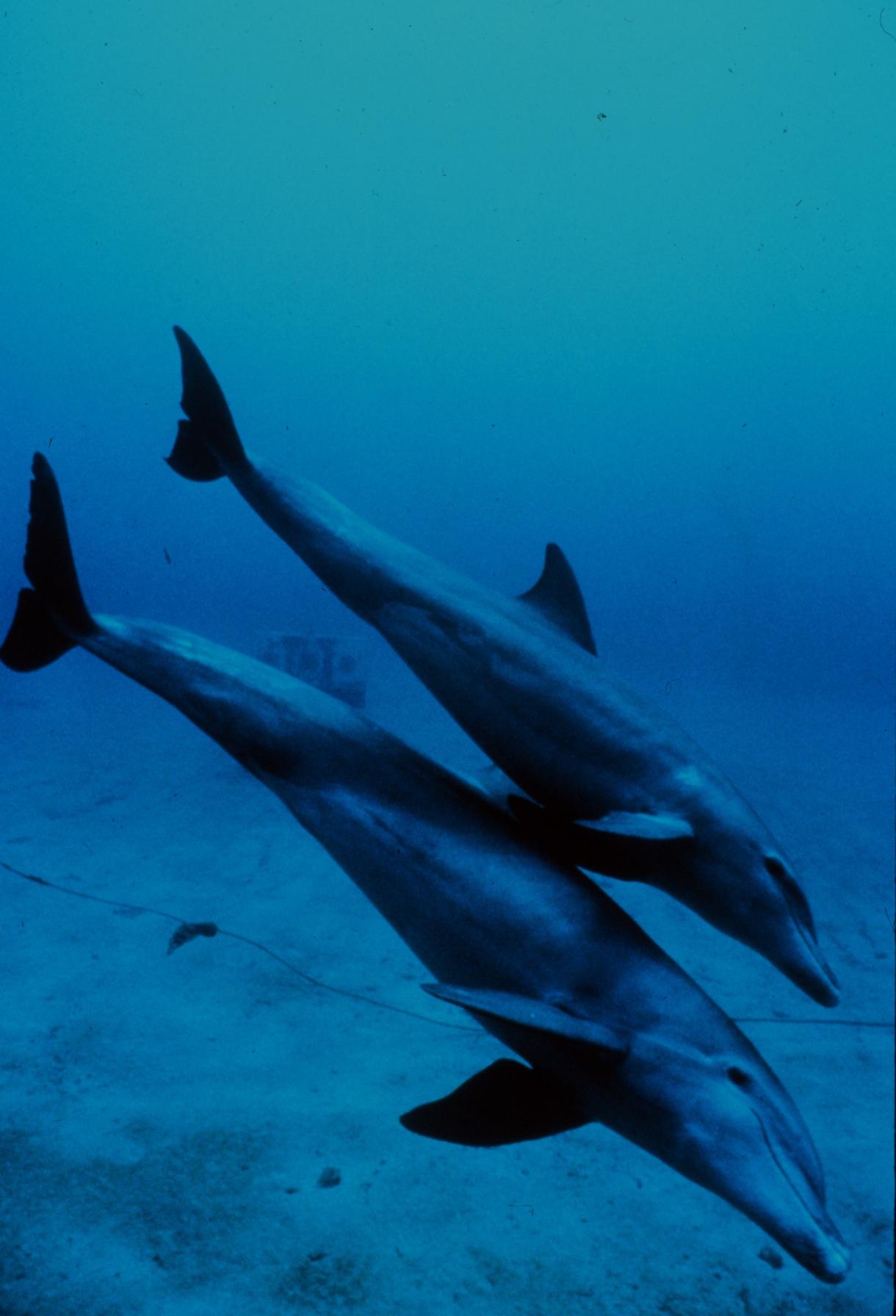
Mother and juvenile bottlenose dolphins head to the seafloor.

Both sexes have genital slits on the underside of their bodies. The male can retract and conceal his penis through his slit. The female's slit houses her vagina and anus. Females have two mammary slits, each housing one nipple, one on each side of the genital slit. The ability to stow their reproductive organs (especially in males) allows for maximum hydrodynamics. The breeding season produces significant physiological changes in males. At that time, the testes enlarge, enabling them to hold more sperm. Large amounts of sperm allow a male to wash away the previous suitor's sperm, while leaving some of his own for fertilization. Also, sperm concentration markedly increases. Having less sperm for out-of-season social mating means it wastes less. This suggests sperm production is energetically expensive. Males have large testes in relation to their body size.

During the breeding season, males compete for access to females. Such competition can take the form of fighting other males or of herding females to prevent access by other males. Male Sarasota Bay common bottlenose dolphins with the defensive advantages of male pair-bonding range more widely than unpaired males, and encounter more unrelated females.

In Shark Bay, male Indo-Pacific bottlenose dolphins have been observed working in pairs or larger groups to follow and/or restrict the movement of a female for weeks at a time, waiting for her to become sexually receptive. These coalitions, also known as male reproductive alliances, will fight with other coalitions for control of females. Humans and bottlenose dolphins are the only species that share this type of "gang formation" habit as a form of cooperation.

Mating occurs belly to belly. Dolphins have been observed engaging in intercourse when the females are not in their estrous cycles and cannot produce young, suggesting they may mate for pleasure. The gestation period averages 12 months. Births can occur at any time of year, although peaks occur in warmer months. The young are born in shallow water, sometimes assisted by a (possibly male) "midwife", and usually only a single calf is born. Twins are possible, but rare. Newborn bottlenose dolphins are 0.8 to 1.4 m (2.6 to 4.6 ft) long and weigh 9 to 30 kg (20 to 66 lb), with Indo-Pacific bottlenose dolphin infants being generally smaller than common bottlenose dolphin infants. To accelerate nursing, the mother can eject milk from her mammary glands. The calf suckles for 18 months to up to 8 years, and continues to closely associate with its mother for several years after weaning. Females sexually mature at ages 5–13, males at ages 9–14. Females reproduce every two to six years. Reproduction is moderately seasonal (September–January), peaking from October to December. Calf loss between August and December is followed by rapid conception (1–2 months), whereas conception is delayed (2–9 months) if calf loss occurs between January and July. Weaning ages ranged from 2.7 to 8.0 years, but 66.7% (42 calves) were weaned by their fourth birthday. Females tended to wean mid-pregnancy. Group size was unrelated to water depth or female reproductive success, but reproductive success was predicted by water depth. Shallow water may allow mothers and calves to detect and avoid predatory sharks. Alternatively, or additionally, prey density may be higher in shallow water compared to deep water.

Georgetown University professor Janet Mann argues the strong personal behavior among male calves is about bond formation and benefits the species in an evolutionary context. She cites studies showing these dolphins as adults are inseparable, and that early bonds aid protection, as well as in locating females.

Female bottlenose dolphins have to expend additional energy in carrying out parental care, e.g., infant-carrying behavior. Dolphins do not physically hold their infants but line up in an echelon position with infants swimming beside them. This position creates a change of water flow pattern from the infant which minimizes separation between the mother and infant, but also increases the mother's surface area and creates a drag for the swimmer. This also leaves less energy to use in swimming speed, foraging, and predator evasion.

=== Social interaction ===
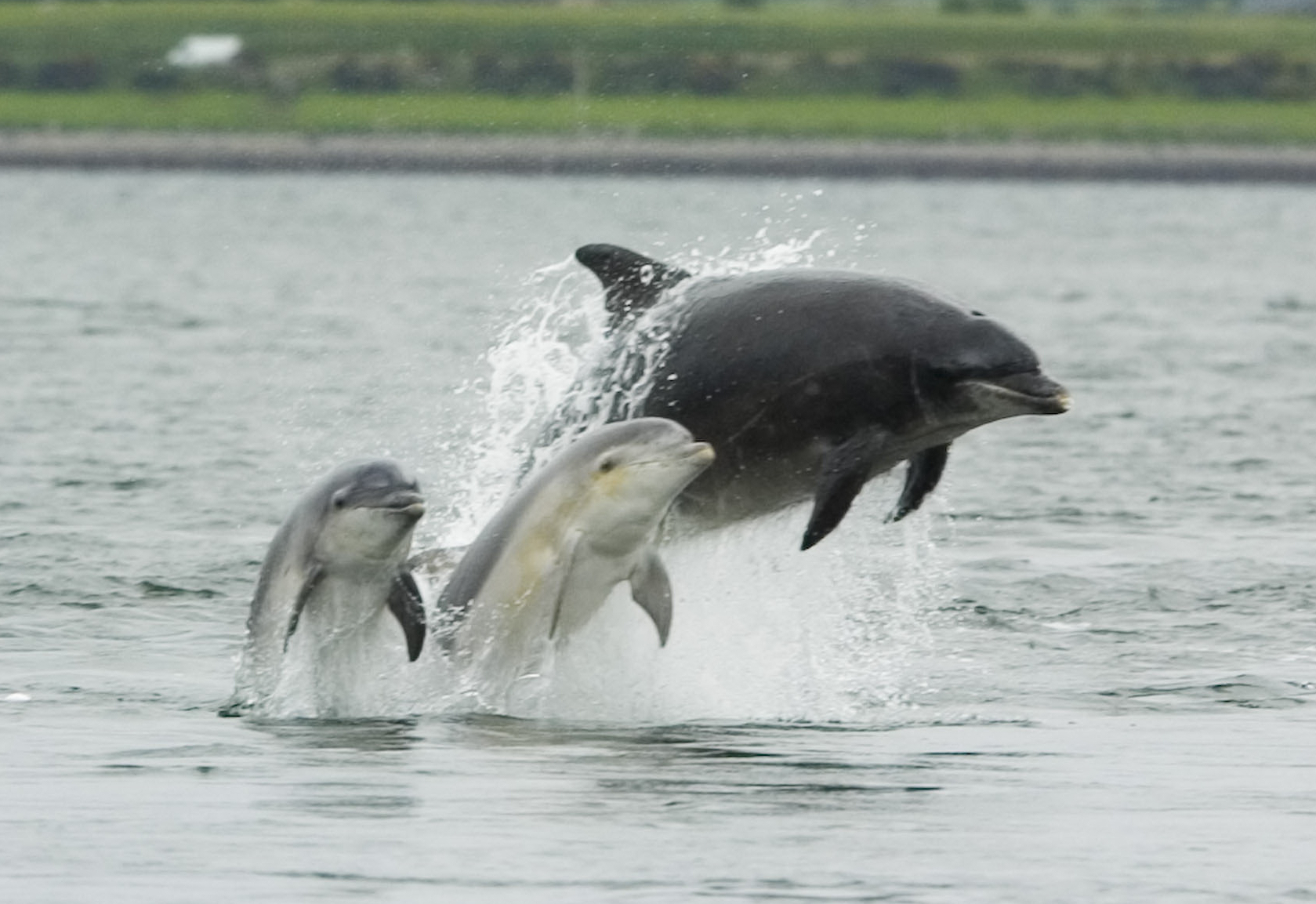
An adult female bottlenose dolphin with her young, Moray Firth, Scotland

Adult males live mostly alone or in groups of two to three, and join pods for short periods of time. Adult females and young dolphins normally live in groups of up to 15 animals. Males give strong mutual support if other males help them, even if they are not friends. However, they live in fission-fusion societies of varying group size, within which individuals change associations, often on a daily or hourly basis. Group compositions are usually determined by sex, age, reproductive condition, familial relations and affiliation histories. In a dolphin community near Sarasota, Florida, the most common group types are adult females with their recent offspring, older subadults of both sexes, and adult males either alone or in bonded pairs. Smaller groups can join to form larger groups of 100 or more, and occasionally exceed 1,000. The social strategies of marine mammals such as bottlenose dolphins "provide interesting parallels" with the social strategies of elephants and chimpanzees.

Bottlenose dolphins studied by Bottlenose Dolphin Research Institute researchers off the island of Sardinia show random social behavior while feeding, and their social behavior does not depend on feeding activity. In Sardinia, the presence of a floating marine fin-fish farm has been linked to a change in bottlenose dolphin distribution as a result of high fish density around the floating cages in the farming area.

== Ecology ==
=== Feeding ===
Fish is one of the main items in the dolphin diet. They also eat shrimps, squid, mollusks, and cuttlefish, and only swallow the soft parts. They eat 22 pounds of fish a day. When they encounter a shoal of fish, they work as a team to herd them towards the shore to maximize the harvest. They also hunt alone, often targeting bottom-dwelling species. The bottlenose dolphin sometimes hits a fish with its fluke, sometimes knocking it out of the water, using a strategy called "fish whacking". "Strand feeding" is an inherited feeding technique used by bottlenose dolphins near and around coastal regions of Georgia and South Carolina. When a pod finds a school of fish, they will circle the school and trap the fish in a mini whirlpool. Then, the dolphins will charge at the school and push their bodies up onto a mud-flat, forcing the fish on the mud-flat, as well. The dolphins then crawl around on their sides, consuming the fish they washed up on shore. This happens only during low tides.

One type of feeding behavior seen in bottlenose dolphins is mud ring feeding.

Bottlenose dolphins conflict with small-scale coastal commercial fisheries in some Mediterranean areas. Common bottlenose dolphins are probably attracted to fishing nets because they offer a concentrated food source. However, human-dolphin interactions extend beyond fisheries and can have significant negative consequences for dolphin behavior and survival. Research has shown that frequent interactions with humans such as feeding, can alter dolphins' natural behaviors. Such exposure often reduces their innate wariness, making them more vulnerable to intentional harm and predation, including shark attacks.

=== Relations with other species ===
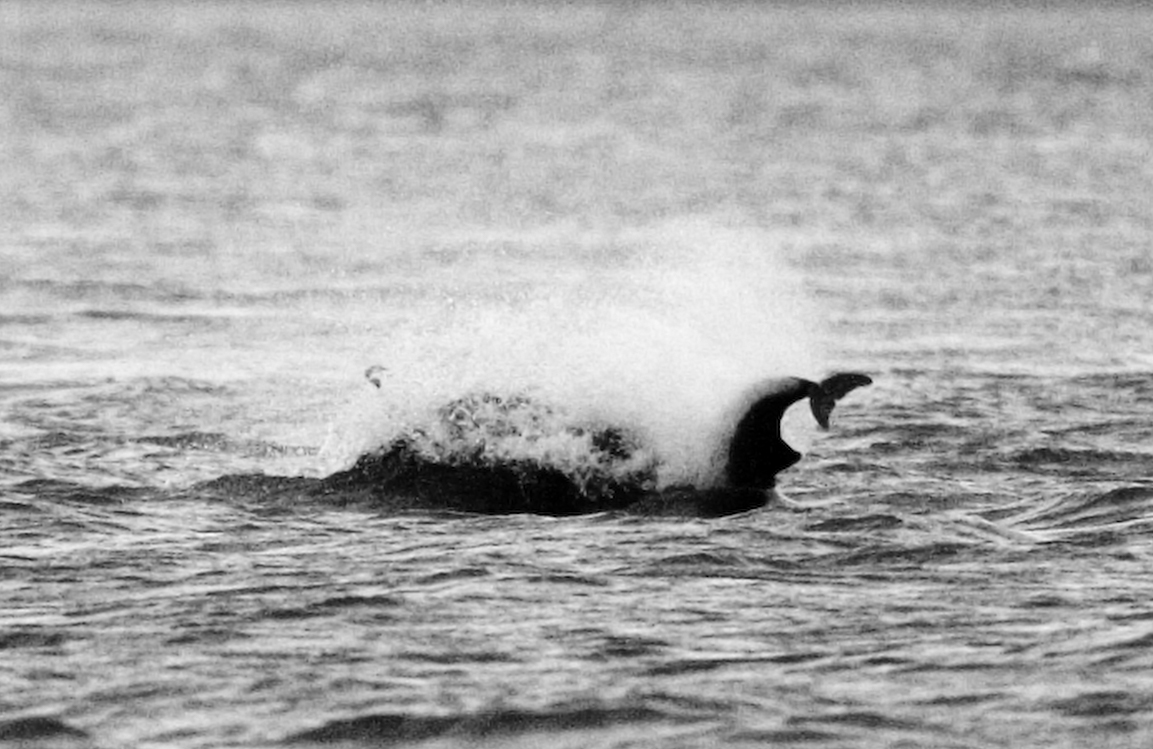
A bottlenose dolphin attacks and kills a harbour porpoise at Chanonry Point, Scotland.

Dolphins can exhibit altruistic behaviour toward other sea creatures. On Mahia Beach, New Zealand, on March 10, 2008, two pygmy sperm whales, a female and calf, stranded on the beach. Rescuers attempted to refloat them four times. Shortly, a playful bottlenose dolphin known to local residents as Moko arrived and, after apparently vocalizing at the whales, led them 200 m (660 ft) along a sandbar to the open sea, saving them from imminent euthanasia. In 2019 a female was observed caring for a juvenile melon-headed whale, the first reported instance of a bottlenose dolphin adopting a non-conspecific infant.

The bottlenose dolphin can behave aggressively. Males fight for rank and access to females. During mating season, males compete vigorously with each other through displays of toughness and size, with a series of acts, such as head-butting. They display aggression towards sharks and smaller dolphin species. At least one population, off Scotland, has practiced infanticide, and also has attacked and killed harbour porpoises. University of Aberdeen researchers say the dolphins do not eat their victims, but are simply competing for food. However, Dr. Read of Duke University, a porpoise expert researching similar cases of porpoise killings that had occurred in Virginia in 1996 and 1997, holds a different view. He states dolphins and porpoises feed on different types of fish, thus food competition is an unlikely cause of the killings. Similar behaviour has been observed in Ireland. In the first half of July 2014, four attacks with three porpoise fatalities were observed and caught on video by the Cardigan Bay Marine Wildlife Centre in the Cardigan Bay, Wales.

The bottlenose dolphin sometimes forms mixed species groups with other species from the dolphin family, particularly larger species, such as the short-finned pilot whale, the false killer whale and Risso's dolphin. They also interact with smaller species, such as the Atlantic spotted dolphin and the rough-toothed dolphin. While interactions with smaller species are sometimes affiliative, they can also be hostile.

=== Predators ===
Some large shark species, such as the tiger shark, the dusky shark, the great white shark and the bull shark, frequently prey on the bottlenose dolphin, especially weak individuals. A pod of bottlenose dolphins is capable of defending against most sharks by charging the predator; dolphin 'mobbing' behavior of sharks can occasionally prove dangerous for the shark, notably in smaller species. Targeting a single adult dolphin can pose a risk for a shark of similar size. Killer whale populations in New Zealand and Peru have been observed preying on bottlenose dolphins, but this seems rare, and other orcas may swim with dolphins. Swimming in pods allows dolphins to better defend themselves against predators. Bottlenose dolphins either use complex evasive strategies to outswim their predators, or mobbing techniques to batter the predator or force it to flee.

== Relation to humans ==
=== Interaction ===
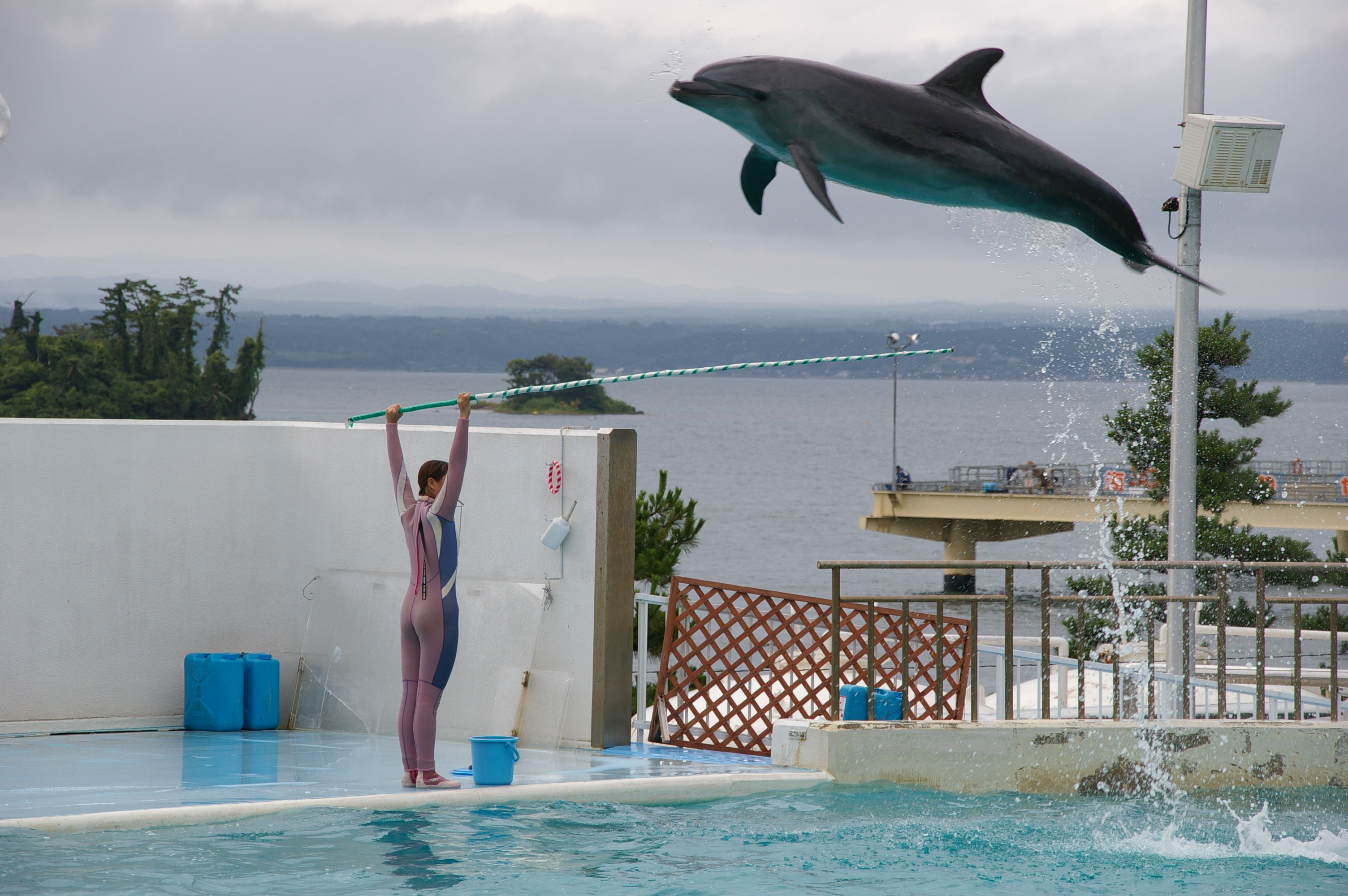
At Notojima Aquarium, Japan

The species sometimes shows curiosity towards humans in or near water. Occasionally, they rescue injured divers by raising them to the surface. They also do this to help injured members of their own species. In November 2004, a dramatic report of dolphin intervention came from New Zealand. Four lifeguards, swimming 100 m (330 ft) off the coast near Whangārei, were approached by a shark (reportedly a great white shark). Bottlenose dolphins herded the swimmers together and surrounded them for 40 minutes, preventing the shark from attacking, as they slowly swam to shore.

In coastal regions, dolphins run the risk of colliding with boats. Researchers of the Bottlenose Dolphin Research Institute first quantified data about solitary bottlenose dolphin diving behavior in the presence and absence of boats. Dolphins responded more to tourist than fishing vessels. Driving behavior, speed, engine type and separation distance all affected dolphin safety.

However, dolphins in these areas can also coexist with humans. For example, in the town of Laguna in south Brazil, a pod of bottlenose dolphins resides in the estuary, and some of its members cooperate with humans. These cooperating dolphins are individually recognized by the local fishermen, who name them. The fishermen typically stand up to their knees in the shallow waters or sit in canoes, waiting for the dolphins. Now and then, one or more dolphins appear, driving the fish towards the line of fishermen. One dolphin then displays a unique body movement outside the water, which serves as a signal to the fishermen to cast their nets (the entire sequence is shown here, and a detailed description of the signal's characteristics is available here). In this unique form of cooperation, the dolphins gain because the fish are disoriented and because the fish cannot escape to shallow water where the larger dolphins cannot swim. Likewise, studies show that fishermen casting their nets following the unique signal catch more fish than when fishing alone, without the help of the dolphins. The dolphins were not trained for this behavior; the collaboration began before 1847. Similar cooperative fisheries also exist in Mauritania, Africa.

Commercial 'dolphin encounter' enterprises and tours operate in many countries. The documentary film The Cove documents how dolphins are captured and sold to some of these enterprises (particularly in Asia) while the remaining pod is slaughtered. In addition to such endeavors, the individuals swim with and surface near surfers at the beach. Bottlenose dolphins perform in many aquaria, generating controversy. Animal welfare activists and certain scientists have claimed that the dolphins do not have adequate space or receive adequate care or stimulation. However, others, notably SeaWorld, counter by claiming that the dolphins are properly cared for, have much environmental stimulation and enjoy interacting with humans.

Eight bottlenose dolphins that lived at the Marine Life Aquarium in Gulfport, Mississippi, were swept away from their aquarium pool during Hurricane Katrina. They were later found in the Gulf of Mexico and returned to captivity.

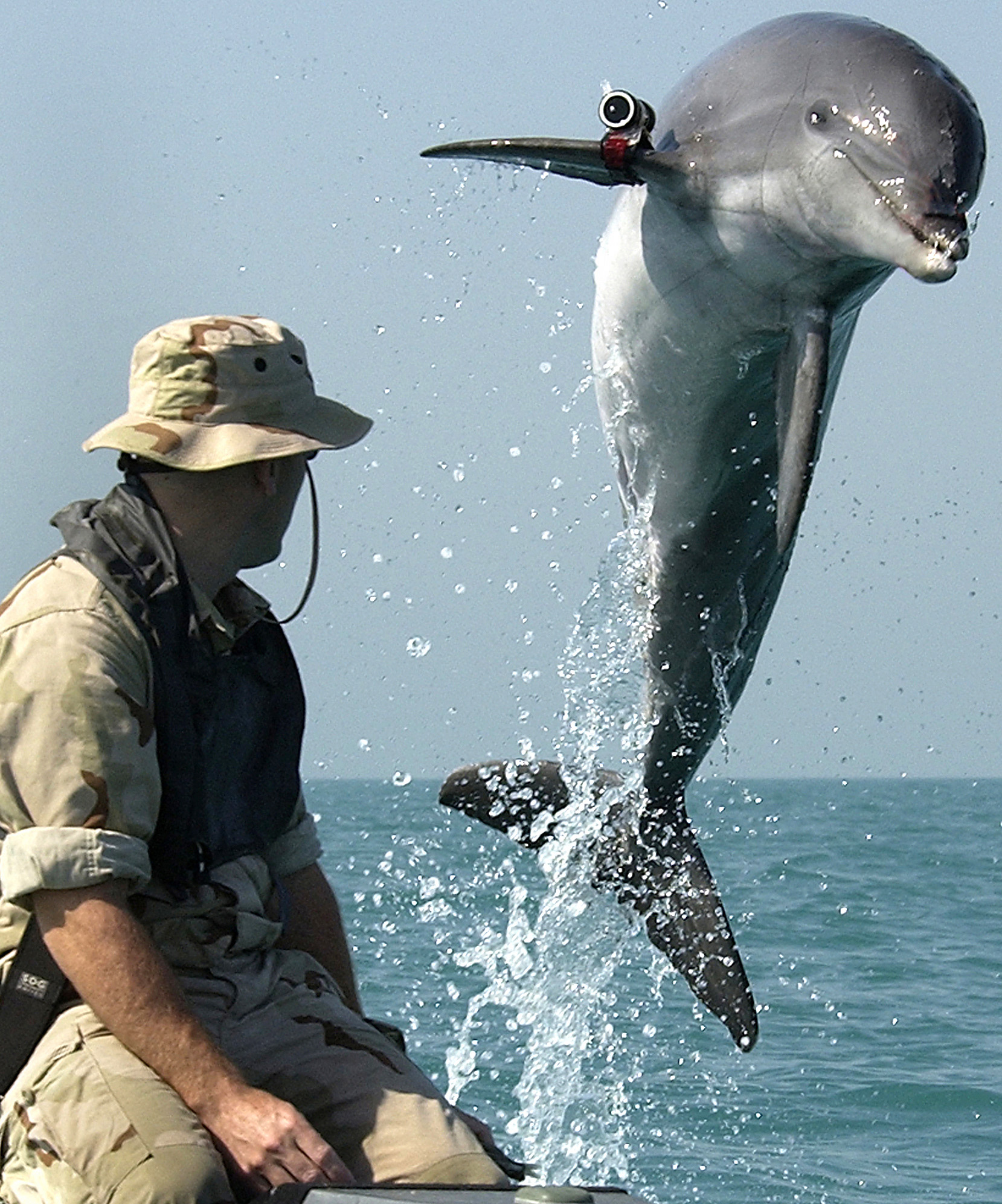
K-Dog, trained by the United States Navy to find mines and boobytraps underwater, leaping out of the water

The military of the United States and Russia train bottlenose dolphins as military dolphins for wartime tasks, such as locating sea mines and detecting enemy divers. The U.S.'s program is the U.S. Navy Marine Mammal Program, located in San Diego.

Tião was a well-known solitary male bottlenose dolphin that was first spotted in the town of São Sebastião in Brazil around 1994 and frequently allowed humans to interact with him. The dolphin became infamous for killing a swimmer and injuring many others, which later earned him the nickname "Killer Dolphin".

=== Cultural influence ===
The popular television show Flipper, created by Ivan Tors, portrayed a bottlenose dolphin in a friendly relationship with two boys, Sandy and Bud. A seagoing "Lassie", Flipper understood English and was a hero: "Go tell Dad we're in trouble, Flipper! Hurry!" The show's theme song contains the lyric "no one you see / is smarter than he". The television show was based on a 1963 film, with a sequel, Flipper's New Adventure (1964), and was remade as a feature film in 1996, starring Elijah Wood and Paul Hogan, as well as a second TV series running from 1995 to 2000, starring Jessica Alba.

Other television appearances by bottlenose dolphins include Wonder Woman, Highway to Heaven, Dolphin Cove, seaQuest DSV, and The Penguins of Madagascar, in which a dolphin, Doctor Blowhole, is a villain. In the HBO movie Zeus and Roxanne, a female bottlenose dolphin befriends a male dog, and in Secrets of the Bermuda Triangle (1996 Ian Toynton movie), a girl named Annie (played by Lisa Jakub) swims with dolphins. Human and dolphin interaction segments, shot on location in the Florida Keys with Dolphin Research Center, are featured on Sesame Street and on a Halloween episode of The Simpsons, Treehouse of Horror XI.

Dolphin Tale, directed by Charles Martin Smith, starring Nathan Gamble, Ashley Judd, Harry Connick Jr., Morgan Freeman, Cozi Zuehlsdorff and Kris Kristofferson, is based on the real-life story of the dolphin Winter, who was rescued from a crab trap in December 2005 and lost her tail, but learned to swim with a prosthetic one. Dolphin Tale 2, a sequel to the 2011 film, featured another rescued dolphin named Hope and an appearance by Bethany Hamilton. The sequel was released on September 12, 2014. The NFL's Miami Dolphins uses the bottlenose dolphin as its mascot and team logo. Factual descriptions of the dolphins date back into antiquity—the writings of Aristotle, Oppian and Pliny the Elder all mention the species.

=== Threats ===
Between 1950 and 2020, about four million dolphins have drowned in fishing nets. Tuna fishing crews have been the most responsible for the largest number of deaths. In 1972, the U.S. government passed a law limiting the number of dolphins that could be killed yearly by tuna fishing crews. Dolphins in the United Kingdom have also been found to contain high levels of pollutants in their tissues. Heavy metals including mercury, PCBs and DDT are of great concern. These pollutants can cause harm in dolphins growth development, reproduction, and immunity. Since the mid-1990s, hundreds of dolphins have been trained to perform in shows presented by aquariums, zoos, and amusement parks. Scientists conduct various types of research to understand the dolphin's communication system.

The man-made chemical perfluorooctanesulfonic acid (PFOS) may be compromising the immune system of bottlenose dolphins. PFOS affects the immune system of male mice at a concentration of 91.5 ppb, while PFOS has been reported in bottlenose dolphins in excess of 1 ppm. High levels of metal contaminants have been measured in tissues in many areas of the globe. A recent study found high levels of cadmium and mercury in bottlenose dolphins from South Australia, levels which were later found to be associated with kidney malformations, indicating possible health effects of high heavy metal concentrations in dolphins.

=== Conservation ===
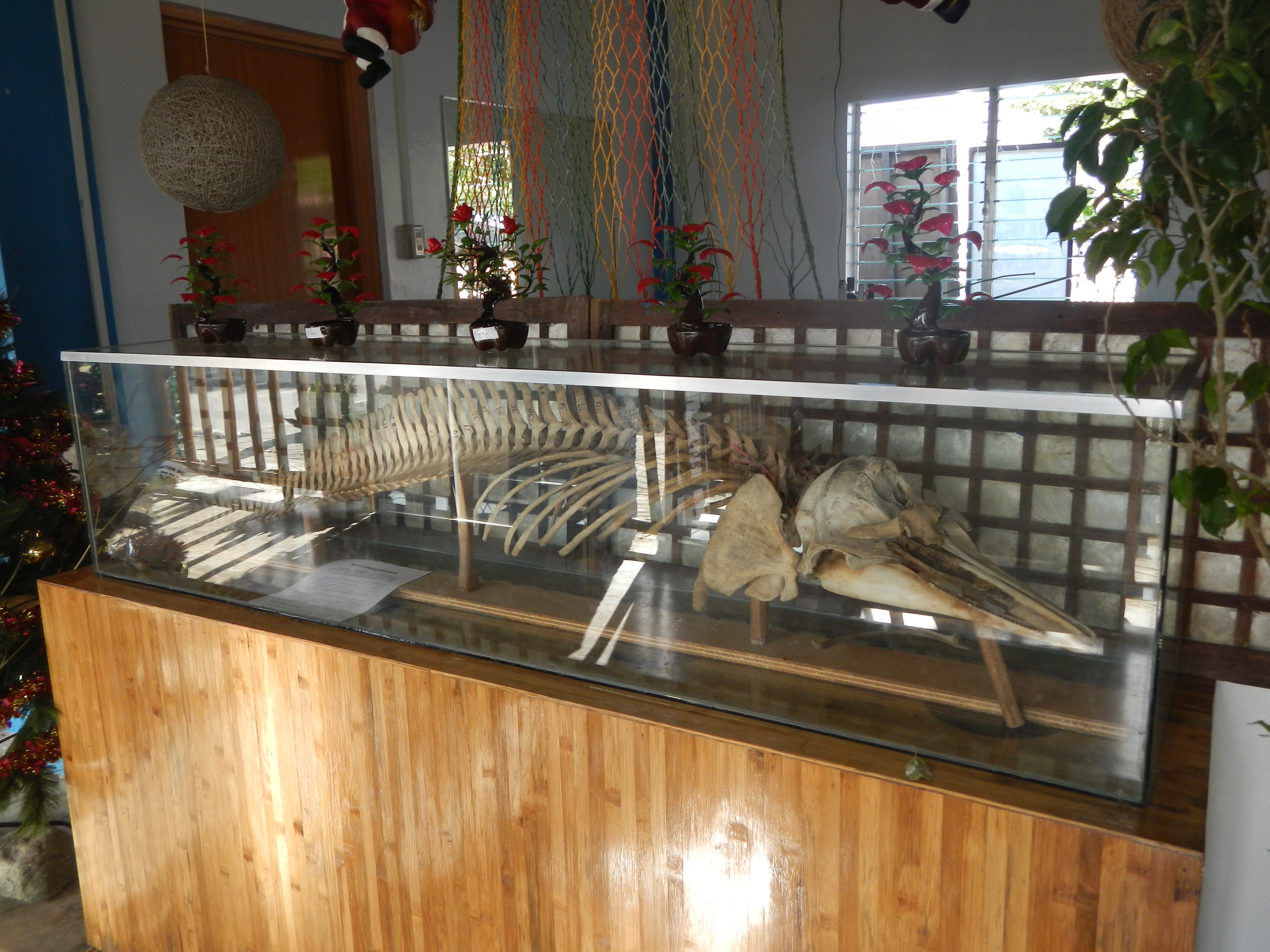
Bottlenose dolphin (at Hundred Islands National Park)

Bottlenose dolphins are not endangered. Their future is stable because of their abundance and adaptability. However, specific populations are threatened due to various environmental changes. The population in the Moray Firth in Scotland is estimated to consist of around 190 individuals, and are under threat from harassment, traumatic injury, water pollution and reduction in food availability. Likewise, an isolated population in Doubtful Sound, New Zealand, is in decline due to calf loss coincident to an increase in warm freshwater discharge into the fiord. Less local climate change, such as increasing water temperature may also play a role but has never been shown to be the case. One of the largest coastal populations of bottlenose dolphins in Shark Bay, Western Australia was forecast to be stable with little variation in mortality over time (Manlik et al. 2016).

In United States waters, hunting and harassing of marine mammals is forbidden in almost all circumstances, from passage of the Marine Mammal Protection Act of 1972.

== See also ==
- Unihemispheric slow-wave sleep
- Audiograms in mammals
- Cetacean intelligence
- Dolphinarium
- Common bottlenose dolphin
