= Kekaimalu =

Wholphin (1985–2024)

- Species: Tursiops truncatus × Pseudorca crassidens
- Sex: Female
- Born: May 15, 1985; Sea Life Park, Hawaii
- Died: July 8, 2024 (age 39)

Kekaimalu was the first wholphin born in the United States and the first to survive to maturity. Kekaimalu was born at Sea Life Park in Hawaii on May 15, 1985. Her name means "from the peaceful ocean". This type of hybrid was considered unexpected given the sometimes extreme size difference between a female common bottlenose dolphin (typically 2 meters long and 300 kilograms) and a male false killer whale (over 5 meters long and over 1,800 kg). Both false killer whales and bottlenose dolphins have 44 chromosomes, allowing them to produce fertile offspring.

Kekaimalu proved fertile when she gave birth at a very young age. John Blanchard, a trainer at Sea Life Park, has said about Kekaimalu:

“The wholphin was darker than the other dolphins, and her nose looked like it was chopped off… [she] represented an unusual example of hybridization between two species of dolphin with markedly different sizes and appearances.”

Kekaimalu had approximately 66 teeth. Bottlenose dolphins have 88 teeth and false killer whales have 44 teeth.

In 1991, Kekaimalu gave birth to her daughter, Pohaikealoha, with an unknown, male dolphin. For two years, she cared for the calf, but did not nurse it; it was hand-reared by trainers. Pohaikealoha died at age 9. On December 23, 2004, Kekaimalu had her third calf, daughter Kawili Kai, sired by a male bottlenose. The calf was nursed and was very playful. Only months after birth, it was the size of a one-year-old bottlenose dolphin. All three calves were three-quarters bottlenose dolphin and one-quarter false killer whale. Kekaimalu died on July 8, 2024 at the age of 39. Kawili Kai remains in captivity in Sea Life Park.

== Family tree ==
Tanui Hahai (false killer whale) ♂	Punahele (bottlenose dolphin) ♀
Unknown dolphin ♂	Kekaimalu (wholphin) ♀	bottlenose dolphin ♂
Unnamed child	Pohaikealoha ♀	Kawili Kai ♀
