= Male reproductive alliances =

Male reproductive alliances can best be understood within the context of traditional male–male competition, and as a specific case of cooperative competition. Such cooperative behavior, however, does not necessarily result in the equal sharing of resources among cooperating individuals. Cooperation often requires that individuals decrease their own fitness to increase the fitness of another, a behaviour referred to as reciprocal altruism. This behavior becomes even more striking when it occurs within the context of cooperative reproduction, where individuals decrease their own reproductive fitness to improve the reproductive fitness of another.

In some species, males cooperate by forming alliances between related or non-related individuals to gain access to females and prevent other males from mating. Such alliances often result in the monopolization of mating opportunities by one dominant male. The resulting unequal sharing of mating opportunities contradicts the traditional male–male competition over access to females that natural selection implies, making male reproductive alliances an ideal case to study the costs and benefits associated with subordinate individual cooperation. The cost of cooperation (a decrease in fitness) makes it difficult to reconcile the principles of natural selection and cooperation unless there are specific circumstances that make cooperation favorable.

Despite the apparent contradictory nature of cooperation, it does occur in a variety of species. Male reproductive alliances have been documented in bottlenose dolphins (Tursiops sp.), slender mongooses (Galerella sanguine), lions (Panthera leo), chimpanzees (Pan troglodytes), and other primates. However, such behavior may or may not have evolved within the context of reproduction. Alliances may improve an individual's fitness by either improving foraging capabilities or lessening the cost of defending territories.

The reproductive tradeoffs for males participating in reproductive alliances depends on the extent to which mating is shared among alliance members, and the extent to which alliance membership incurs a reproductive fitness advantage over competing as a single male. Three mechanisms have been hypothesized to reconcile the principles of natural selection and cooperation: kin selection, direct reciprocity and mutualism . Separate cases have provided evidence supporting all three of the routes described. Male alliances have been hypothesized to have evolved within the context of kin selection in red howler monkeys, within the context of direct reciprocity in savanna baboons and within the context of mutualism in lions. Determining the evolutionary context of cooperative behavior can be difficult. Two things to consider regarding male alliances are whether the coalition comprises related or unrelated individuals and how stable the coalitions are. Male alliances involve complex interactions with many costs and benefits, making the study of such cooperative behavior both difficult and fascinating.

== Kin selection and inclusive fitness ==
When coalitions are composed of relatives, the contradictory nature of male reproductive alliances is easily resolved through inclusive fitness theory. The theory of inclusive fitness, proposed by Hamilton (1964) states that individuals can enhance their own reproductive fitness by securing the reproductive success of their relatives 10. For kin selection to increase the reproductive fitness of the altruist, according to Hamilton (1964) as cited in Nowak (2006) the coefficient of relatedness, between the donor and recipient of the altruistic act, must be greater than the cost-to-benefit ratio of the altruist act (r < c/b). In other words, the reproductive benefit gained by the recipient of the altruistic act times the coefficient of relatedness must be greater than the reproductive cost of the individual performing the altruistic act (rb > c). Therefore, in alliances composed of closely related individuals, where there is a large coefficient of relatedness, it is widely believed that inclusive fitness has been the principal driving force for the evolution of male reproductive cooperation.

Pope (1990) demonstrated that it was advantageous for both dominant and subordinate male red howler monkeys to be members of a male alliance. While males formed coalitions of both related and unrelated individuals, related troops were more stable and lasted longer than unstable troops. Such findings indicate that despite the low reproductive success of subordinate males, given that dominant males secured all mating opportunities, it was still beneficial to be in a group as opposed to being alone, particularly if that coalition was composed of related individuals. The study suggested that for red howler monkey coalitions, kin selection was the primary mechanism involved in the formation of male alliances. While subordinate males decreased their direct fitness by cooperating with dominant males, they increased their inclusive fitness by cooperating with relatives. Male philopatry, or the behavior of remaining in natal groups, in many cases sets the stage for such alliances among relatives. Later Pope (2013) also discovered that the reproductive success of males within coalitions increases with increasing relatedness. That being said, while being a member of a male alliance has direct reproductive benefits for individuals, alliances come with a cost. Status shifts and mate guarding behavior often result in injury to the participants.

== Direct reciprocity ==
Coalitions can also provide a reproductive benefit without comprising related individuals. In some species, coalitions of nonrelatives are fairly stable over time providing valuable reproductive benefits for the individuals involved. Lion collations composed of 2–6 individuals were initially thought to be made up of related individuals; however, it is now known that a large percent of lion alliances (42%) are composed of unrelated individuals. Such findings indicate that kin selection is not the only driving force behind the formation of male coalitions. It is often unclear how male coalitions of unrelated individuals arise.

The hypothesis of direct reciprocity was proposed by Trivers (1971) to explain altruistic behaviors among nonrelatives. Direct reciprocity states that individuals are more likely to cooperate with individuals that they are likely to encounter again. The altruist performs a behavior that benefits another individual but decreases their own fitness. Repayment for the altruistic act follows later when the two individuals meet again, and the former altruist becomes the receiver of the altruistic act and the former receiver becomes the altruist. Direct reciprocity can operate between unrelated individuals because the benefit to the receiver is greater than the cost to the altruist; therefore, when both individuals have been on the receiving end of their partnership they have both increased their fitness. The simplest explanation for direct reciprocity is a tit-for-tat model in which individuals who have been on the receiving end of an altruistic act are more likely to cooperate in the future. The tit-for-tat strategy is successful in societies where there is a tendency for individuals not to cooperate. A more fitting strategy for situations in which cooperation is already common is the win-stay, lose-shift strategy. In the win-stay, lose-shift strategy individuals repeat their last act, either cooperate or defect cooperation, when they are doing well, and change their methods when they are doing poorly. For direct reciprocity to lead to stable cooperative behavior, the probability of the two cooperative individuals encountering each other again must be greater than the cost/benefit ratio of the altruistic act (w>c/b).

Despite the strategy, there are very few documented cases of direct altruism in general and even fewer cases of reciprocal altruism within the confines of reproduction, with the exception of savanna baboons. Subordinate male savanna baboons form friendly relations with dominant males who rely on the subordinate males’ help to secure a monopolization of the females against intruding males. The friendly relationship between the dominant male and the subordinate males is only temporary; eventually the subordinate males work together to overturn the dominant male, ending his reproductive monopoly and thus allowing subordinate males to temporarily secure mating opportunities, until a new dominant male emerges. The key to this hypothesis is that dominant male is the newest member of the coalition. Since, the subordinate males have lived together prior to the dominant male's arrival, researchers suggest that such cohabitation has allowed the baboons to come to a mutual “agreement” that they will work together to overturn the dominant male. The coalitions formed by the lower ranking males have been interpreted as direct reciprocity because the cooperative subordinate males have presumably cooperated before. However, while the savanna baboon behavior can be viewed reciprocal altruism, the evidence is weak and their behavior often deviates from the framework of reciprocal altruism.

== Mutualism ==
Another explanation for male alliances is mutualism. Mutualism benefits both individuals cooperating, in that the immediate benefit associated with cooperating outweighs costs associated with cooperating. Lions provide an interesting case of mutualism. Male lions cannot afford not to cooperate with one another. Single male lions cannot successfully defend and maintain access to a females against invading coalitions of males, which can invade the pride and force the single male to retreat. Therefore, males cooperate to gain and defend access to females. Resident male alliances maintain access to females in that pride, and sire all offspring during their control of the pride. Solitary lions rarely gain access into coalitions; however, when they do they kill all resident cubs before beginning their tenure. Therefore, it is it of vital importance for the males’ reproductive success to be a member of a male coalition and defend females against intruding males. While it was originally believed that male lions formed groups of related individuals, it is now clear that they may also form alliances with unrelated individuals.

Male lion alliances are extremely successful in preventing solitary males from invading their pride. Packer et al. (1991) found that while lions often form coalitions with nonrelatives, they do so only under specific circumstances. The degree of relatedness of coalition members is related to coalition size. Small coalitions are often composed of unrelated individuals while large coalitions are largely composed of related individuals. Although larger coalitions result in more offspring per capita than small coalitions, large coalitions are only composed of close relatives. In large groups only a select few males were successful in mating, resulting in a large discrepancy in reproductive fitness among coalition members. In small groups no male was dominant and individuals displayed similar reproductive fitness.

Therefore, in lions, researchers propose that cooperation between non-relatives is hypothesized has evolved in cases where there is little variance in mating opportunities among coalition members, and males share equally in mating opportunities. Larger coalitions result in greater variability of mating opportunities, and therefore researchers suggest that kinship (indirect fitness benefit) is necessary for maintenance and success of larger male lion coalitions. In smaller groups male lions are thought to share a “mutual dependence”. Smaller groups are composed largely of unrelated individuals which eliminates the possibility of kin selection. Without cooperation, males would not be able to defend their pride. Mutualism appears to be the driving force in the formation of small male lion alliances, whereas kin selection appears to be of greater importance in the formation and maintenance of larger collations. Such findings demonstrate that the formation of male alliances not only occurs differently between species but also within species.

== Super alliances ==
Adding to the variability of male alliances, some species such as bottlenose dolphins form at least two levels of male alliances. The first level of alliances, termed first order alliances, to guard access to females and closely resemble the alliances previously discussed in primate species. Second order alliances form between two first order alliances. The resulting “super alliance” works to herd females and defend them, preventing outside males from gaining access to females. While first order alliances can be very stable, often lasting over ten years, second order alliances are more dynamic. On average males in first order alliances are more closely related than second order alliances which do not display genetic relatedness.

Scientists suggest that the different levels of alliances in bottlenose dolphins have risen from different evolutionary contexts. Inclusive fitness is suggested as the driving force behind first order alliances of related individuals. However, first order alliances composed of unrelated individuals as well as second alliances of unrelated individuals also occur, indicating that there may be another mechanism favoring the formation of male alliances. Male Sarasota Bay common bottlenose dolphins with the defensive advantages of male pair-bonding range more widely than unpaired males, and encounter more unrelated females. Nonetheless, research also supports earlier predictions of high female promiscuity, which would decrease the value of male alliances. There are also potential mutualistic benefits for individuals involved in the alliance. In the case of the lance-tailed manakin, such benefits include more effective female guarding, which in turn further enhances the reproductive success of alliance members. These findings further demonstrate that the formation of male alliances is highly variable and context dependent.

== Conclusions ==
There have been many hypotheses set forward to explain the formation and stability of male alliances, most notably kin selection, direct reciprocity and mutualism. While there are many factors that dictate the formation and stability of male reproductive alliances, scientists propose that the formation of male alliances is largely a result of a need for males to cooperate in order gain access to females. If there is intense competition over access to females, males may form alliances if there is a greater reproductive benefit to being a member of an alliance over being a solitary male. In male-biased populations, male cooperative reproductive behavior is rare. However, there are extraordinary cases in which cooperation is favorable such as outlined in red howler monkey, savanna baboon, lion and bottlenose dolphin communities.
