= Bottlenose Dolphin Research Institute =

Research and educational centre

Coordinates: 42°29′25″N 8°51′29″W

The Bottlenose Dolphin Research Institute (BDRI) is a research and educational centre dedicated to the understanding and conservation of cetaceans and the marine environment in which they live. The Institute's BDRI center was founded by the biologist Bruno Díaz López in Sardinia, Italy in 2005. In 2014, the BDRI opened a new facility in Galicia, Spain.

BDRI concentrates its efforts on research into dolphins because, as predators, they can serve as indicators of the ecosystem’s health. The BDRI researches ways to alleviate threats to dolphins such as marine pollution, over-fishing, entanglement in nets, and whaling.

== BDRI research projects ==
BDRI research projects provide scientific data to assist environmental agencies in managing and conserving marine natural resources.

- Cetacean distribution along the Galician coast: Current studies by the BDRI highly focus on cetacean species frequenting the inshore waters of the Ría de Arousa. Twenty species of cetaceans have been recorded in Galician waters, of which the most abundant appear to be short-beaked common dolphins and common bottlenose dolphins. Other species present in the area include harbour porpoises, Risso's dolphins and the long-finned pilot whale. Conservation issues for cetaceans in Galician waters include interactions with fisheries (which may be a significant cause of mortality), overfishing, and oil spills.

- Behavioral ecology of dolphins and impact of human activities on their lives: Much of the research work is based upon repeat observations of individual dolphins, providing data for a range of long-term and ongoing studies on the abundance, site fidelity, home range, social structure and behavior of this population. The study of dolphins’ social structures defines an important class of ecological relationships between individuals and their nearby conspecifics. Common bottlenose dolphins live in fission–fusion societies within which individuals associate in small groups that change in composition, often on a daily or hourly basis. Fission–fusion societies limit the effect of within-unit competition through unit splits during periods of high competition, and they enhance cooperative effects through unit cohesion when the ecological costs of aggregating are low or benefits of sociality are high. Human activities can influence the distribution of food resources, which may promote the evolution of social organizations as a response to fluctuations in the costs of feeding competition. Therefore, fission–fusion societies present a good opportunity to examine the costs and benefits of association in dolphin populations affected by human use of coastal waters, especially by fisheries activities and habitat modification.

Individual-based studies focusing explicitly on the variability of social unit structure in relation to anthropogenic factors are few. BDRI researchers studied interactions between dolphins and gillnets along the north-eastern coast of Sardinia. Although dolphins benefit from taking fish entangled in gillnets, the association with gillnets is harmful because it exposes dolphins to additional risk. An observed annual estimate of the number of dolphins caught in gillnets was 3.54%. The extent of the estimated by-catch is worrisome, in terms of the ability of bottlenose dolphins off Sardinia to sustain such an annual loss. The higher annual numbers of immature dolphins than adults dolphins caught in gillnets was related with a lack of experience, and the tendency of immatures to play and/or spend a lot of time scouting.

Marine aquaculture and, in particular intensive fish farming, have shown a large expansion in most Mediterranean countries over the last ten years. To curb predation, many marine fish farms employ control methods which exclude, harass or remove predators. One such method, predator netting, creates a physical barrier that protects farmed fish from attacks by airborne and underwater predators. The incidental capture of marine mammals by commercial fisheries is often a controversial and emotive issue. A potential impact on marine mammals as a result of aquaculture interaction is death or injury through entanglement in gear. BDRI researchers carried out the first attempt in the Mediterranean basin to obtain information on encounter rate, group size and incidental capture of bottlenose dolphins in a marine fish farm. The regular occurrence of some dolphins suggests individual preferences for the fish farm area. The incidental bottlenose dolphin capture observed in large, loose predator nets is cause for concern, as it is questionable whether or not the bottlenose dolphins in the area can sustain incidental capture of this magnitude. The information gained from this study showed the necessity for further regulations to be established, both in the use of predator nets and management of marine fish farms.

Assessing the consequences of fisheries and habitat modification with relatively obvious effects on marine predators can be difficult. BDRI researchers showed how coastal fisheries and aquaculture are not only directly affecting marine predators but could also indirectly affect their social structure and behaviour. The feeding opportunities for dolphins that are created by human activities have become part of their "way of life", part of their habitat requirements. When top predators display complex social responses to activities not directed at them, the task of studying all possible effects in the food chain can become even more challenging.

Bottlenose dolphins living around coastal regions have received much attention due to their increased vulnerability of inhabiting areas where marine traffic is concentrated. Marine traffic has previously been observed to elicit responses in cetacean behaviors, but the cause and effects of these interactions has yet to be fully understood. BDRI's study area of Aranci Bay, Sardinia, provides a unique insight into an area where the interactions of bottlenose dolphins and vessels remains largely unchecked. BDRI studies showed that the dolphins were surfacing less regularly in the presence of vessels and this response was further enhanced during vessel approaches. Moreover, by examining the influence of different types of vessel it was evident that the dolphins elicited a stronger response to tourist than fisheries vessels. The behavior vessels display around the dolphins as well as speed, engine type and distance of approach were all factors that needed to be taken into consideration when analysing the changes observed. Research is contributing to a wider management scheme to ensure that marine traffic is monitored effectively when bottlenose dolphins are present.

- Dolphins communication: Bioacoustics research provides important insights into animal behavior. Dolphins (family: Delphinidae) are an extremely vocal mammalian family and vocal communication plays an important role in mediating social interactions. Most BDRI studies of dolphin vocalizations have concentrated on bottlenose dolphins, Tursiops truncatus (in the Mediterranean, Italy, and in the Atlantic Ocean, Spain) and T. aduncus (in the Persian Gulf, Abu Dhabi, UAE). Until recently, communication behaviour had a limited role in conservation, being restricted to enhancing captive breeding programs or use in species counts. However, knowledge of how individuals within a population communicate can generate information ranging from measures of habitat use, social relevance, geographical variation, cultural transmission, that can be applied to conservation. Marine mammals use sound for activities essential to survival and reproduction. Bottlenose dolphins are extremely vocal mammalian species, and vocal communication plays an important role in mediating social interactions. Amid the abundant literature pertaining to vocalizations of bottlenose dolphins, very little is known about the vocal repertoire of Mediterranean wild bottlenose dolphins. BDRI bioacoustical studies carried out year round from 2005 represent the first attempt to obtain information on the repertoire and production patterns of bottlenose dolphins resident in an area characterized by important interaction with human activities (tourism, aquaculture and coastal fisheries). Many vocal signals were strongly implicated in social and feeding interactions. Although many of these vocalizations have been previously described in the literature, their association with specific behaviours linked with human activities provides additional contextual information about their potential use as communication signals. One of BDRI's most recent projects shows that the number of whistles recorded in a group increased significantly as the number of mother-calf pairs increased, confirming that whistles may be used as contact calls. These studies use benign techniques to demonstrate the great diversity of communication signals emitted and indicate a functional role of these vocalizations during the observed behaviours. Cetaceans (dolphins, whales and porpoises) are often faced with the challenge of hearing strange sounds in environments with noise from both natural and anthropogenic sources. BDRI researchers have documented that human-introduced noise induces behavioural reactions in bottlenose dolphins. In addition noise pollution is being considered as a cause of displacement of cetaceans from preferred habitats. Short-term noise pollution may not create significant problems. Repeated or long-term noise pollution, however, can cause stress and debilitation and may be related to dolphin mortality. Related scientific publications:

- Dolphins in the Persian Gulf: At least ten species of cetacean have been identified in the Persian Gulf, but most of these are considered vagrant or seasonal visitor. Only two species of dolphin, the Indo-Pacific humpback (Sousa chinensis) and the Indo-Pacific bottlenose dolphin (Tursiops aduncus) are thought to be common residents of the Gulf. The finless porpoise (Neophocoena phocaenoides) is thought to be an uncommon resident.

The conservation status of these species in Abu-Dhabi waters is unknown, largely because of the lack of research on either species. The world conservation status of these species is Data Deficient, that is, there is insufficient information on which to make an assessment. This deficiency hampers conservation and management efforts and the ability to assess the impact of human activities on local populations of this species.

BDRI researchers, in cooperation with the Environmental Agency of Abu Dhabi, participated in a research project in order to obtain accurate data on population estimate, distribution, potential threats and residence patterns of dolphin species observed in coastal waters of Abu-Dhabi (UAE) for the first time. The final purpose of this project is to inform and improve the design of conservation and management interventions towards these species in Abu-Dhabi waters.

== BDRI Environmental policy ==
As a marine science research team, BDRI researchers have witnessed first hand the effects global warming and climate change have on the planet. Every year, new tropical species are catalogued in North Sardinia, having arrived from tropical waters as an effect of global warming, affecting entire ecosystems. BDRI researchers are committed to the implementation of proactive measures to help protect and sustain the local and global environment for future generations. The BDRI aims to achieve the objective of improved environmental performance through pollution prevention and continuous improvement. All BDRI members, workers and volunteers are expected to conduct their work in a manner compatible with the BDRI's Responsible Travel policy and objectives.
