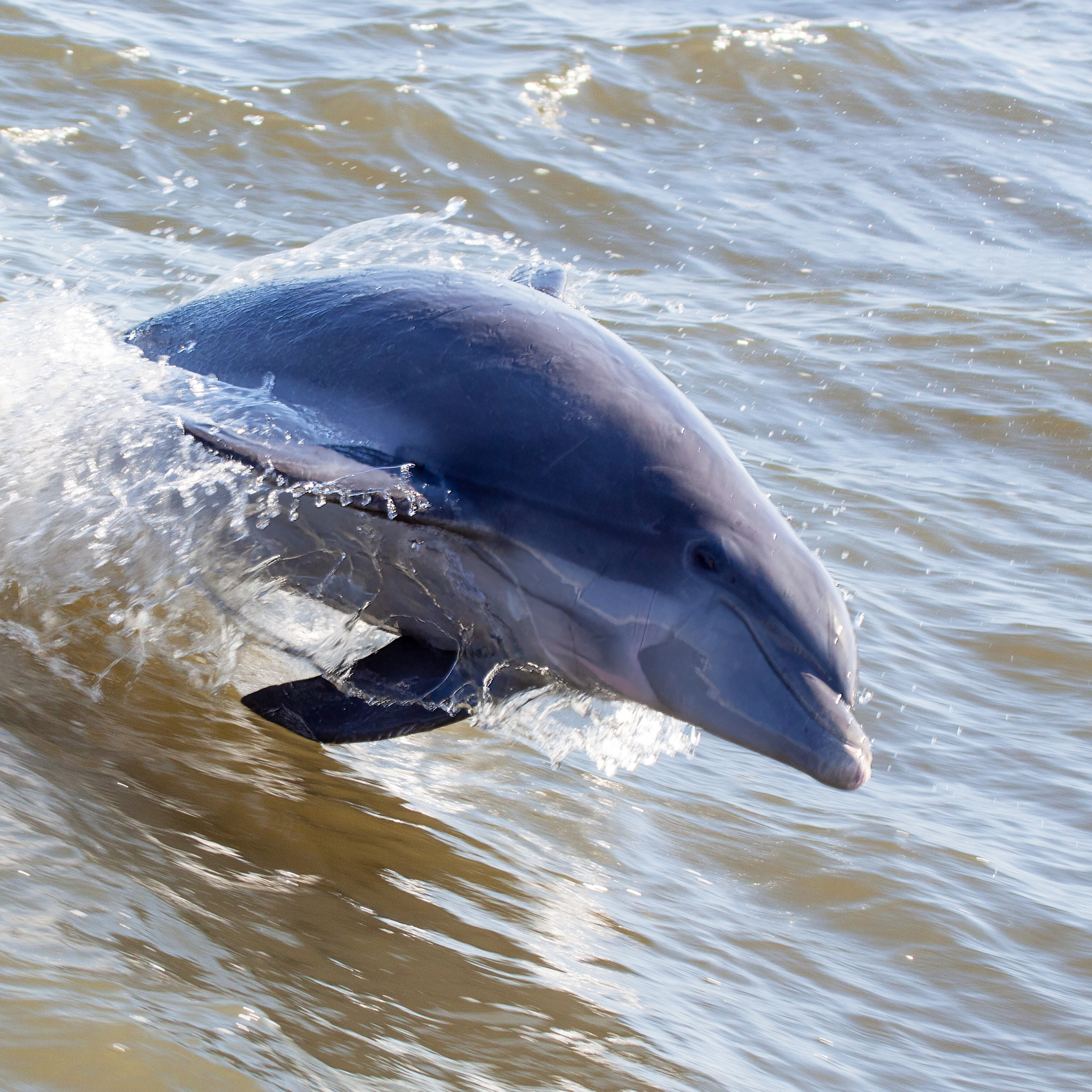

Scientific classification
- Kingdom: Animalia
- Phylum: Chordata
- Class: Mammalia
- Order: Artiodactyla
- Infraorder: Cetacea
- Family: Delphinidae
- Genus: Tursiops
- Species: T. erebennus

Binomial name
- Tursiops erebennus Cope, 1865

Synonyms
- Tursiops tursio erebennus Trouessart, 1904

= Tamanend's bottlenose dolphin =

Species of dolphin

Tamanend's bottlenose dolphin (Tursiops erebennus) is a species of bottlenose dolphin that inhabits coastal waters in the eastern United States. This species was previously considered a nearshore variant of the common bottlenose dolphin Tursiops truncatus.

== Taxonomy ==
Tursiops erebennus was first described by Edward Drinker Cope as Delphinus erebennus in 1865. The type specimen was collected from a fisherman's seine net at the Red Bank community in West Deptford Township, New Jersey. Cope identified various physical differences between T. erebennus and T. truncatus (then known as Delphinus tursio), including a smaller size, fewer vertebrae, and fewer ribs in T. erebennus. However, T. erebennus was subsequently synonymized with T. truncatus. Future studies and stock assessments instead recognized dolphins in the region as belonging to two T. truncatus ecotypes: a nearshore coastal type and an offshore type. Genetic analyses suggested that the nearshore ecotype was genetically distinct. Costa et al. (2022) compared the morphology, mitochondrial DNA, and nuclear DNA of the nearshore and offshore T. truncatus ecotypes in the western North Atlantic. They found considerable differences and evolutionary divergence, and suggested that the offshore ecotype be retained within T. truncatus while T. erebennus was resurrected as the scientific name for the nearshore type.

In the dolphin's original description in 1865, Cope did not provide an explanation for "erebennus" as the species name. He did mention the type specimen as having a dark coloration, so it is postulated that he may have named the species after Erebus, the Greek primordial deity of darkness. Costa et al. (2022) chose Tamanend's bottlenose dolphin as the species' common name, which references Tamanend, Chief of the Turtle Clan of the Lenni-Lenape nation. To choose the common name, Costa et al. consulted with the state-recognized Nanticoke Lenni-Lenape Tribal Nation who live in the area where the holotype was collected.

The Society for Marine Mammalogy accepted Tamanend's bottlenose dolphin as a unique species in 2023.

== Distribution ==
The distribution of Tamanend's bottlenose dolphin is not fully understood. They are known to inhabit nearshore coastal waters, including bays and estuaries, in the eastern United States from New York to Florida. Additionally, they are genetically related to coastal bottlenose dolphin populations in the Caribbean Sea and Gulf of Mexico, and may inhabit these waters as well. Further research is required to determine if the coastal bottlenose populations in the Caribbean and Gulf are also Tamanend's bottlenose dolphin.
