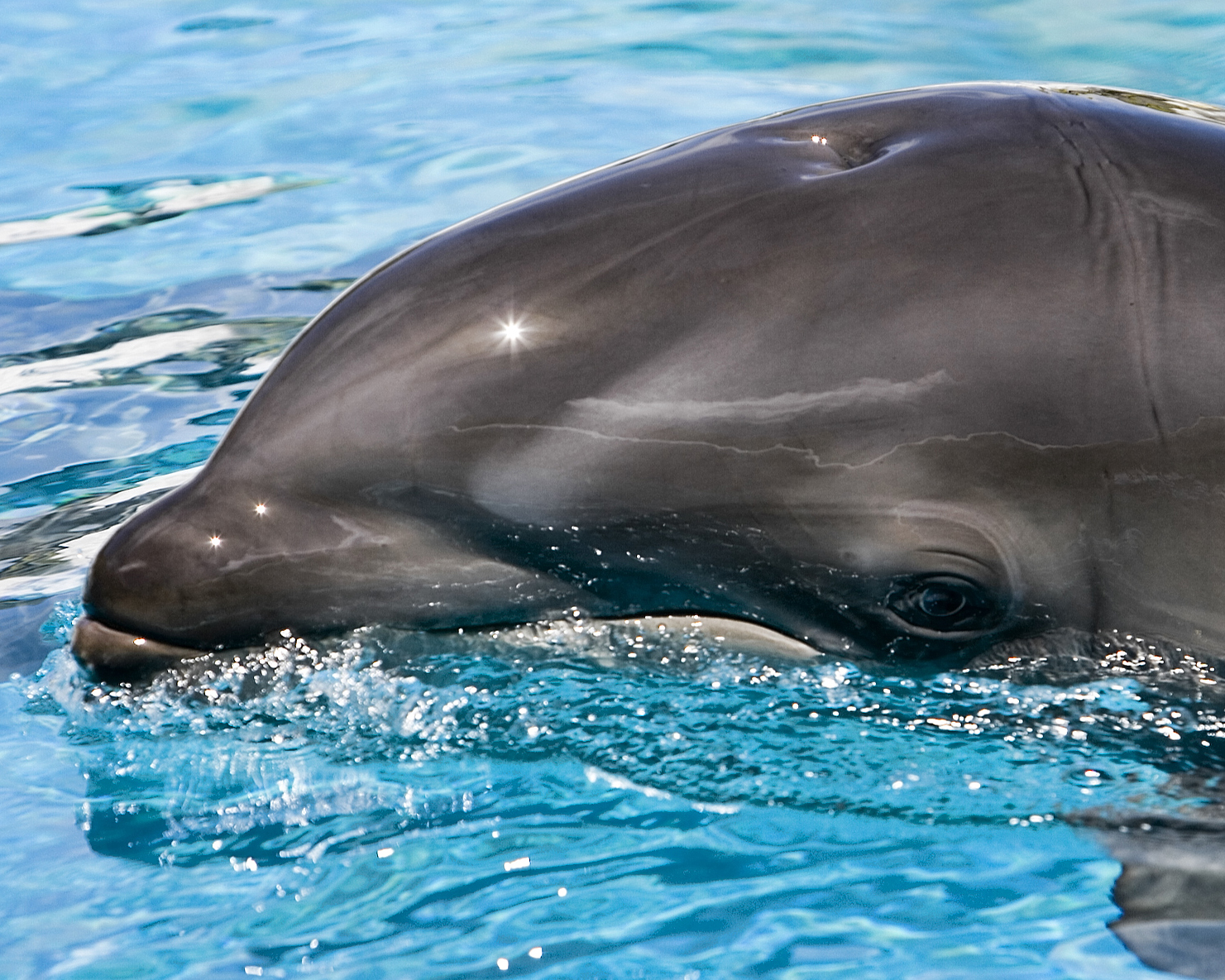
- Kawili Kai, born to Kekaimalu (a female wholphin) by a male dolphin, at 9 months of age in September 2005

Scientific classification
- Kingdom: Animalia
- Phylum: Chordata
- Class: Mammalia
- Order: Artiodactyla
- Infraorder: Cetacea
- Superfamily: Delphinoidea
- Family: Delphinidae
- Hybrid: Tursiops truncatus × Pseudorca crassidens

= Wholphin =

Hybrid born from mating female common bottlenose dolphin and a male false killer whale

A wholphin (portmanteau of whale and dolphin) is an informal term used to refer to a number of rare cetacean hybrids. Wholphins have been born in captivity and have also been reported in the wild. The most well-observed wholphins are captive-born hybrids of false killer whales (Pseudorca crassidens) and common bottlenose dolphins (Tursiops truncatus), although other kinds of toothed whale hybrids have also been referred to by the term "wholphin". Both false killer whales and bottlenose dolphins have 44 chromosomes, allowing them to produce fertile offspring.

Wholphins exhibit physical and behavioural characteristics intermediate between those of their parent species. While the name implies a hybrid of whale and dolphin, taxonomically both parents belong to the oceanic dolphin family, making them both toothed whales. Because of this, some experts have suggested the name "Wholphin" is misleading and have discouraged the use of the term for this reason.

== Examples ==
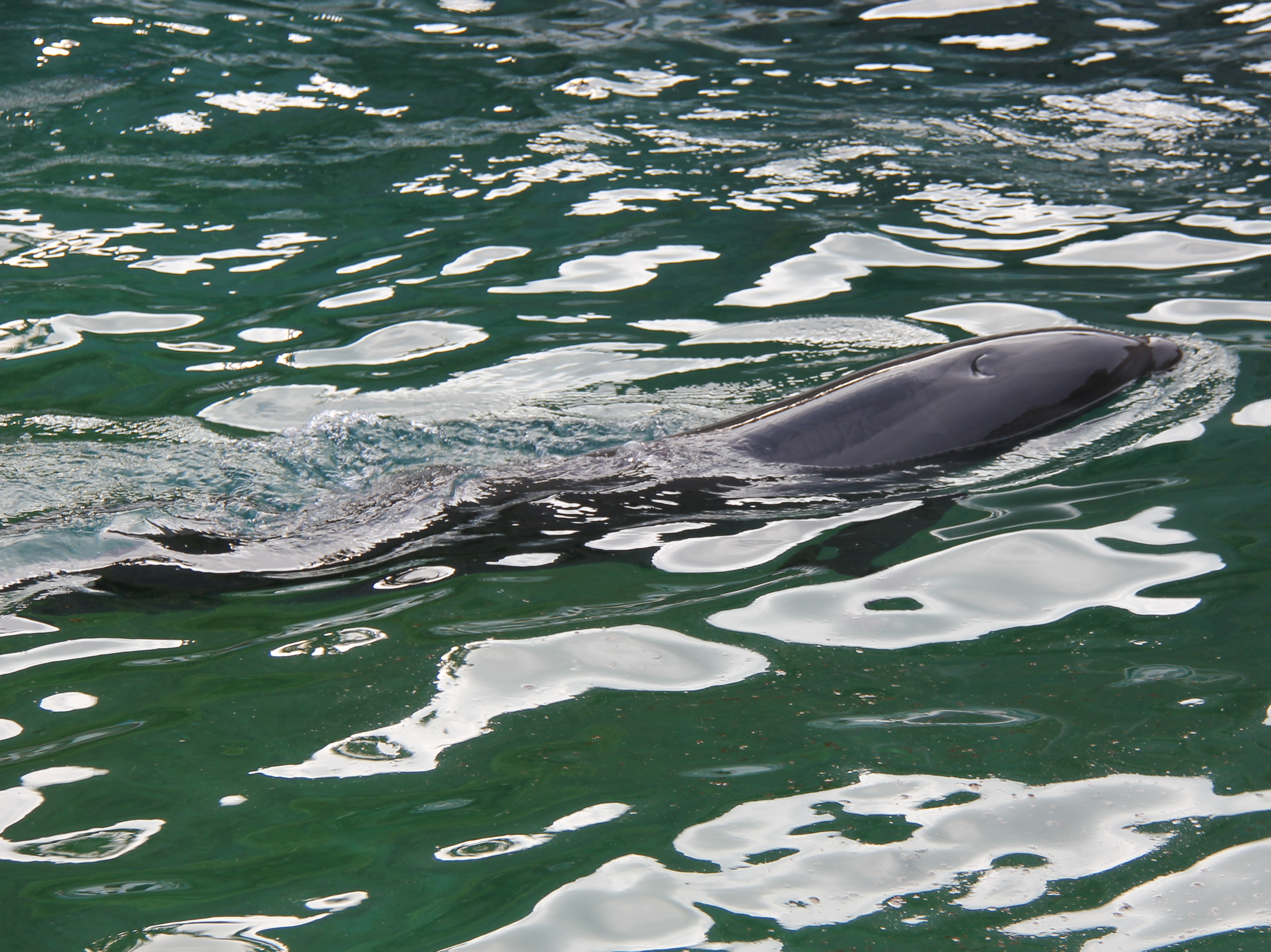
A Wholphin

The first recorded wholphin was a male calf born in Tokyo SeaWorld in 1981. The calf died after 200 days.

=== Kekaimalu ===
The first wholphin in the United States and the first to survive was Kekaimalu, born at Sea Life Park in Hawaii on May 15, 1985.

Kekaimalu was fertile and gave birth to her daughter, Pohaikealoha, with an unknown bottlenose dolphin in 1991. Pohaikealoha was hand-reared by trainers and died at age 9. On December 23, 2004, Kekaimalu had another calf Kawili Kai, sired by a male bottlenose. Only months after birth, it was the size of a one-year-old bottlenose dolphin. All three calves were three-quarters bottlenose dolphin and one-quarter false killer whale. Kekaimalu died on July 8, 2024 at the age of 39. Kawili Kai remains in captivity in Sea Life Park.

=== Other hybrids referred to as "wholphins" ===
In August 2017 a hybrid between a rough toothed dolphin and a melon-headed whale was observed off the coast of the island of Kaua'i. This was the first time such a hybrid had been recorded.

== Capabilities and behaviour ==
Wholphin behavior represents both parent species. They are intelligent, highly social, and can be trained to do complex tasks; shared traits of false killer whales and bottlenose dolphins alike. Captive wholphins have been observed to be playful and show a great deal of curiosity about their surroundings, the same as bottlenose dolphins. Despite being recorded in the wild, only a few confirmed sightings of wholphins have been seen in nature. Although natural sightings are improbable due to the differences in habitat preference and social structure between the parent species, this is not impossible.

== Exterior and physical description ==
Wholphins also have mixed traits from their parents. They are mostly smaller in size compared to false killer whales, but larger than bottlenose dolphins. Their coloring is mostly a dark grey, with their body proportion and dental features falling between the two species (i.e., wholphins have more teeth than bottlenose dolphins but fewer than false killer whales on average).
