= Sea Life Park Hawaii =

Marine mammal park, bird sanctuary and aquarium on the island of Oahu, US

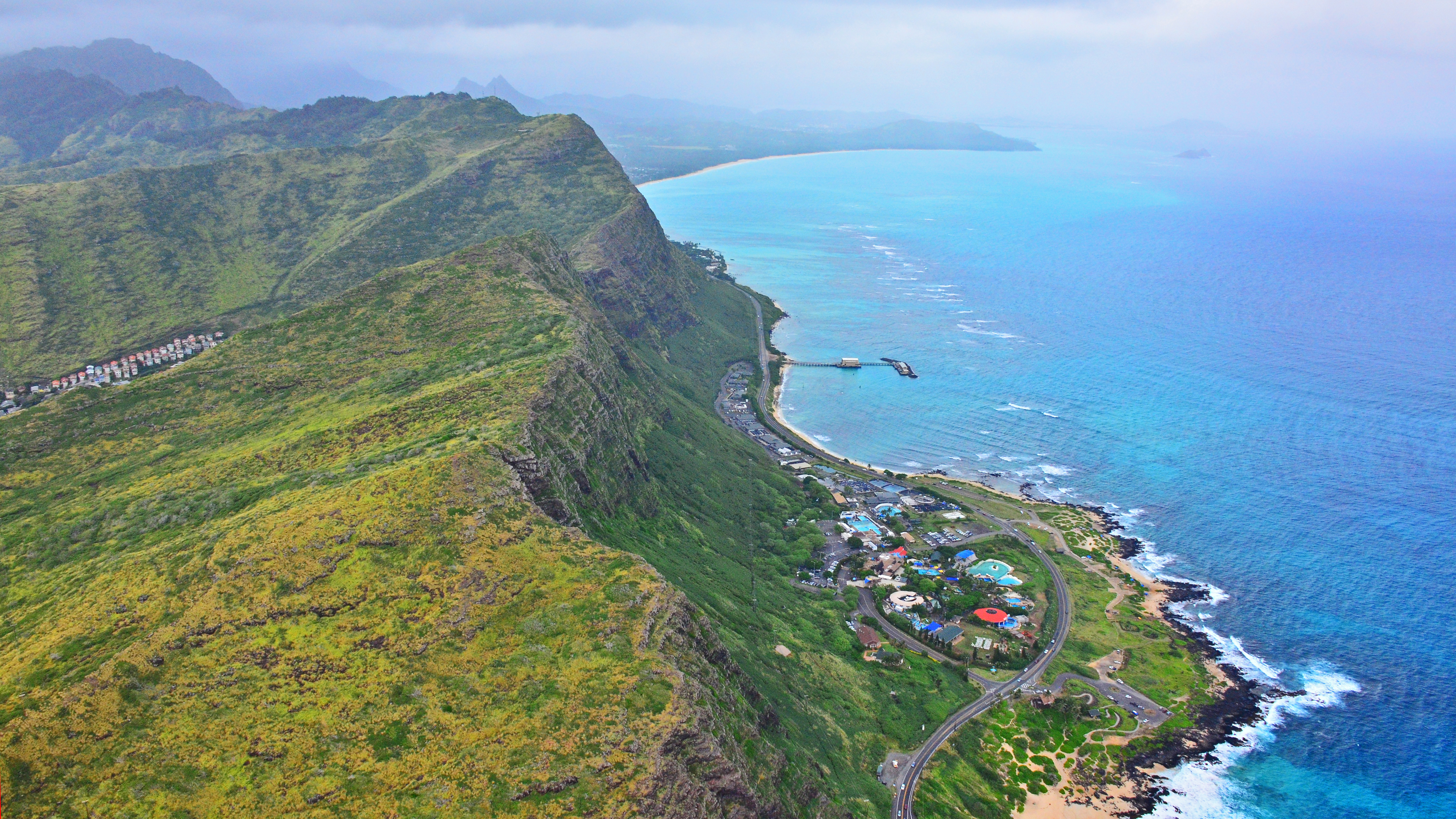
- Interactive map of Sea Life Park Hawaii
- 21.313056°N 157.663056°W
- Date opened: 1964
- Location: Waimānalo, Oahu, Hawaii
- No. of animals: over 2000
- Volume of largest tank: 300,000 US gallons (1,100 m^{3})
- Owner: Herschend
- Website: www.sealifeparkhawaii.com

Sea Life Park Hawaii is a marine mammal park, bird sanctuary and aquarium in Waimānalo near Makapuʻu Point, north of Hanauma Bay on the island of Oahu in Hawaii, United States. The park first opened in 1964 and in early 2025, the park was sold to Herschend.

== Exhibits and facilities ==
Dolphin Lagoon is the venue for the main Aloha Naia show times daily at 12:30 and 3:30pm.

The Penguin Habitat is home to the park's penguins, which are part of the Association of Zoos and Aquariums Species Survival Plan for the Humboldt penguin.

Visitors to the park have the opportunity for up-close animal encounters daily, including Dolphin Encounters, Sea Lion Encounters, and the Hawaiian Reef Encounters.

The Bird Sanctuary is home to many wild marine birds including "iwa" (great frigatebirds), boobies, shearwaters, and albatrosses, most of which came to the sanctuary sick or injured. Visitors can see how these birds are cared for and rehabilitated.

Daily Educational Talk Times May Vary by Day, but generally follow this schedule (as of 6.15.24):

- 10:15am Honu (Hawaiian Green Sea Turtle) Feeding & Talk Story
- 11:00am Meet Kekoa! Hawaiian Monk Seal Talk Story
- 11:15am Humboldt Penguins Talk Story
- 11:45am Sea Lion Talk Story
- 12:30pm Aloa Nai'a (Dolphin) Presentation
- 2:00pm Shark Feeding @ Shark Cave
- 3:30pm Aloha Nai'a (Dolphin) Presentation
- 4:00pm Park Closes

== Activities ==
Sea Life Park Hawaii includes several programs that let visitors interact directly with the animals in the water. All programs are run several times daily.

Conservation Sea Life Park Hawaii is active in several conservation areas, including the release of adolescent green sea turtles that were hatched and raised at the park. To date, the park has actively release upwards of 17,000+ Hawaiian green sea turtles (Honu) around the Hawaiian Islands.

== In popular culture ==
The park was used as a setting and featured in an episode of the show Sanford and Son, and in the 2004 film 50 First Dates.

== Gallery ==
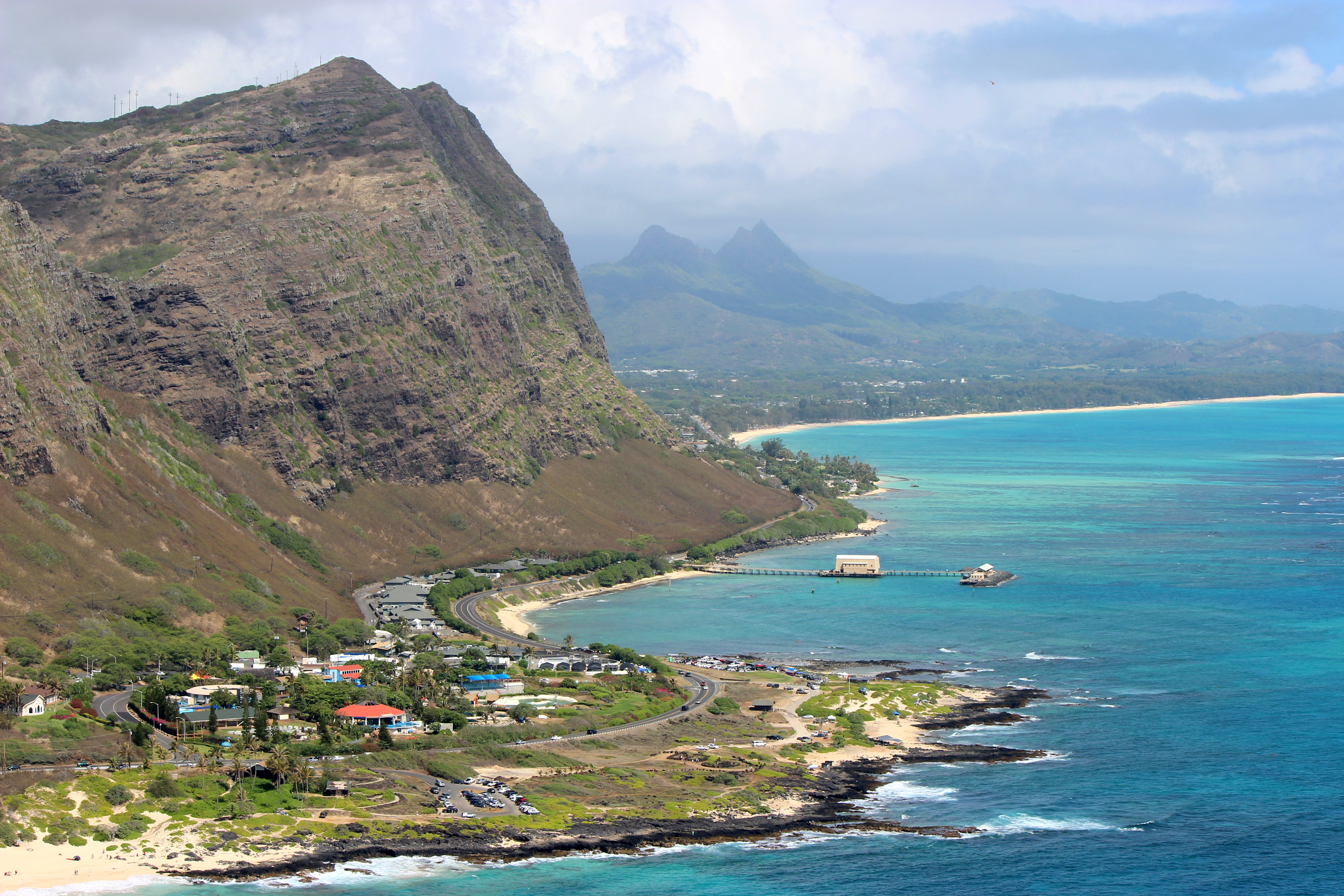
Sea Life Park

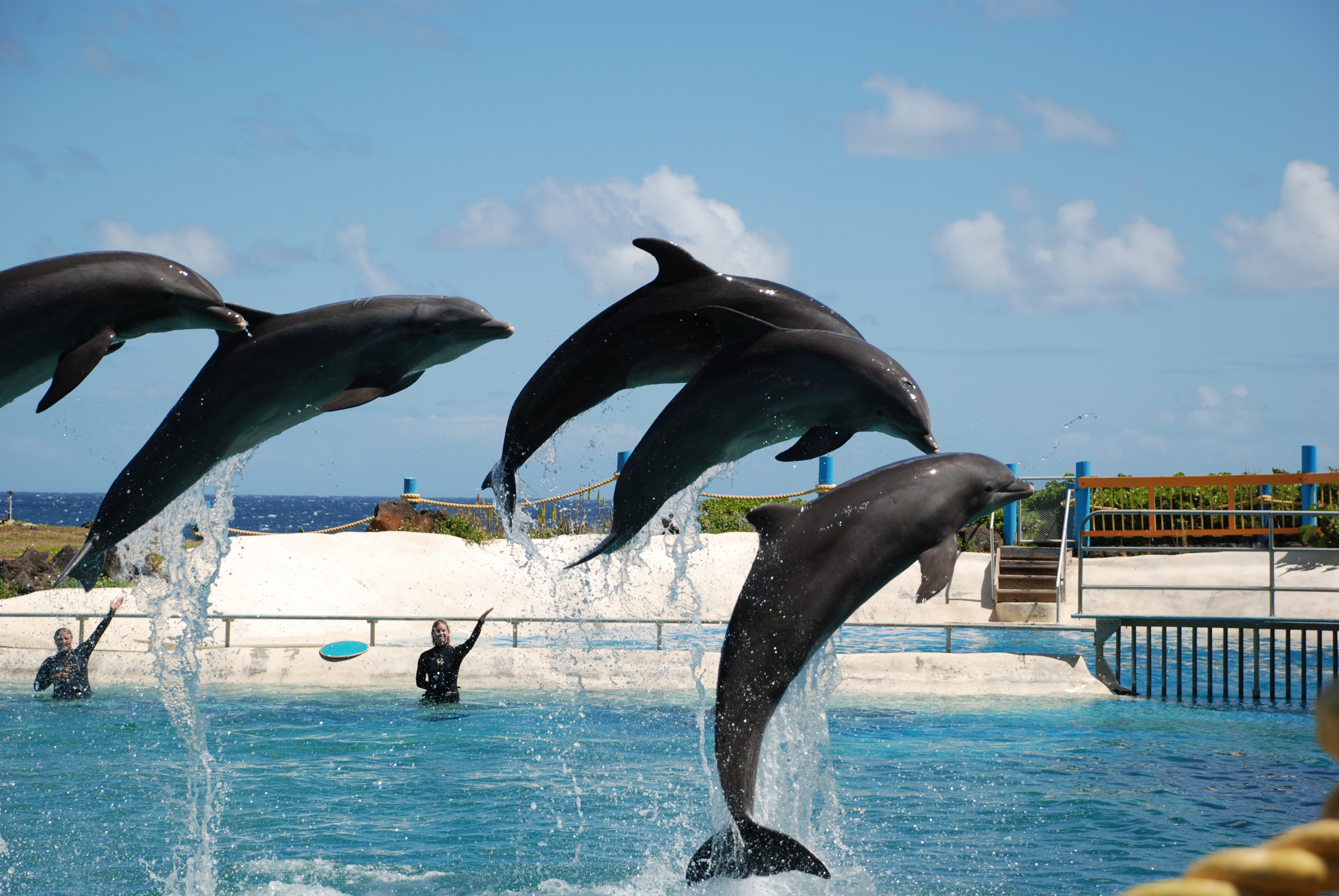
Dolphins at the park

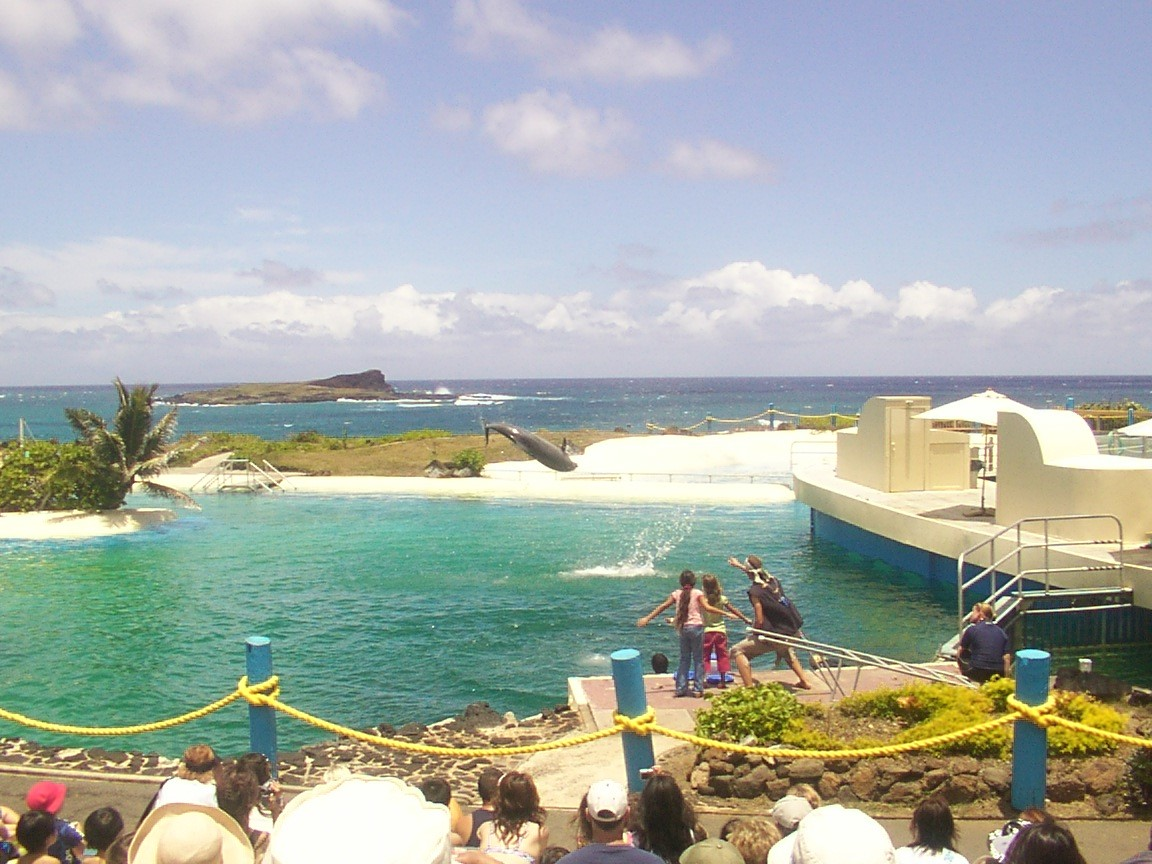

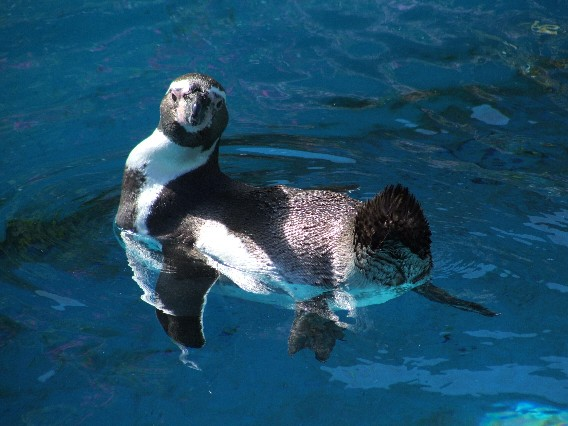
Penguin

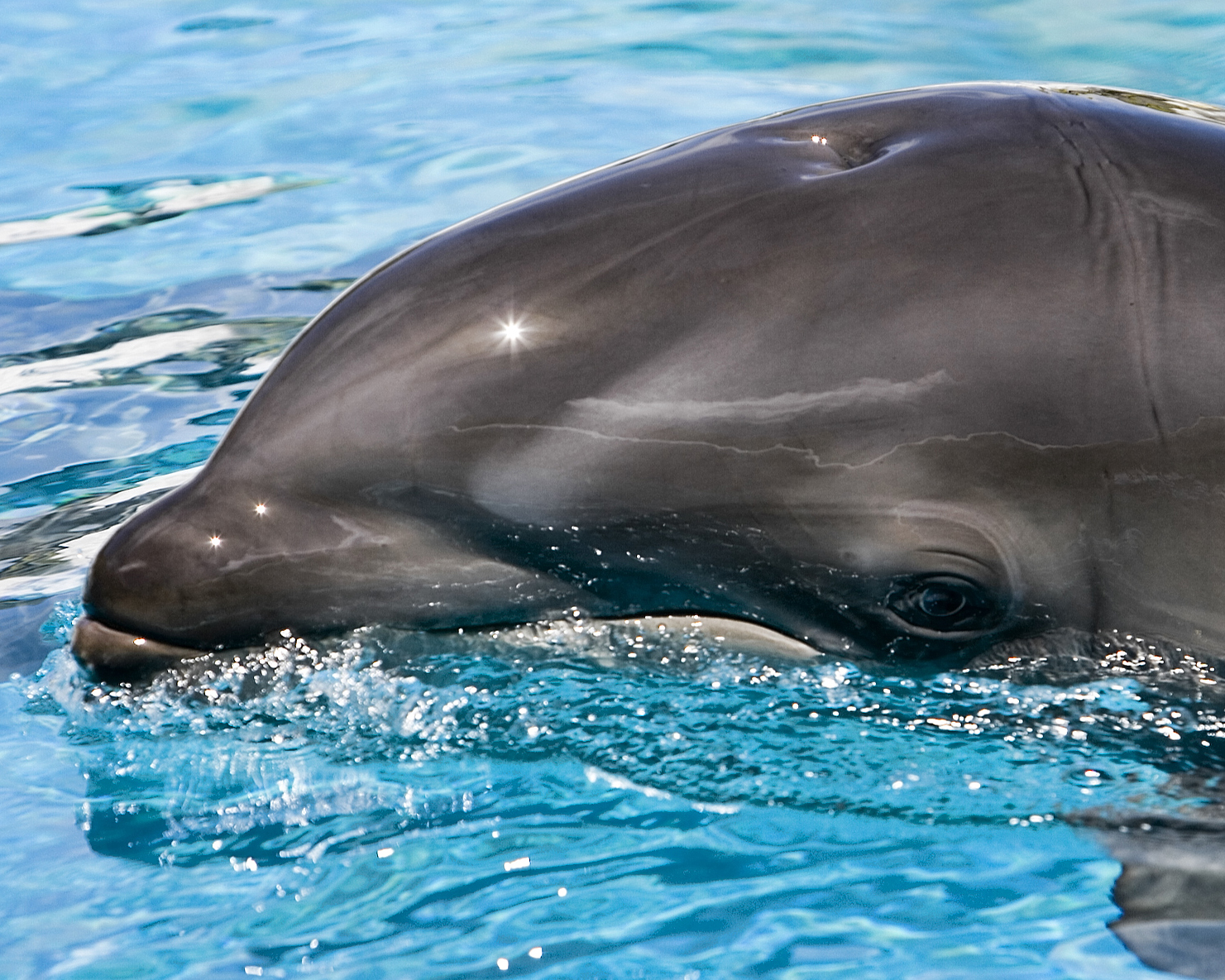
Baby wolphin.
