= The Transparent Society =

1998 book by David Brin

- The Transparent Society
- Author: David Brin
- Language: English
- Genre: Non-fiction
- Publisher: Perseus Books
- Publication date: May 17, 1998
- Publication place: United States
- Media type: Hardback & Paperback
- Pages: 384 pp (1st edition)
- ISBN: 0-7382-0144-8
- OCLC: 41433013
- Dewey Decimal: 323.44/8 21
- LC Class: JC598 .B75 1998b

The Transparent Society (1998) is a non-fiction book by the science-fiction author David Brin in which he forecasts social transparency and some degree of erosion of privacy, as it is overtaken by low-cost surveillance, communication and database technology, and proposes new institutions and practices that he believes would provide benefits that would more than compensate for lost privacy. The work first appeared as a magazine article by Brin in Wired in late 1996. In 2008, security expert Bruce Schneier called the transparent society concept a "myth" (a characterization Brin later rejected), claiming it ignores wide differences in the relative power of those who access information.

== Synopsis ==
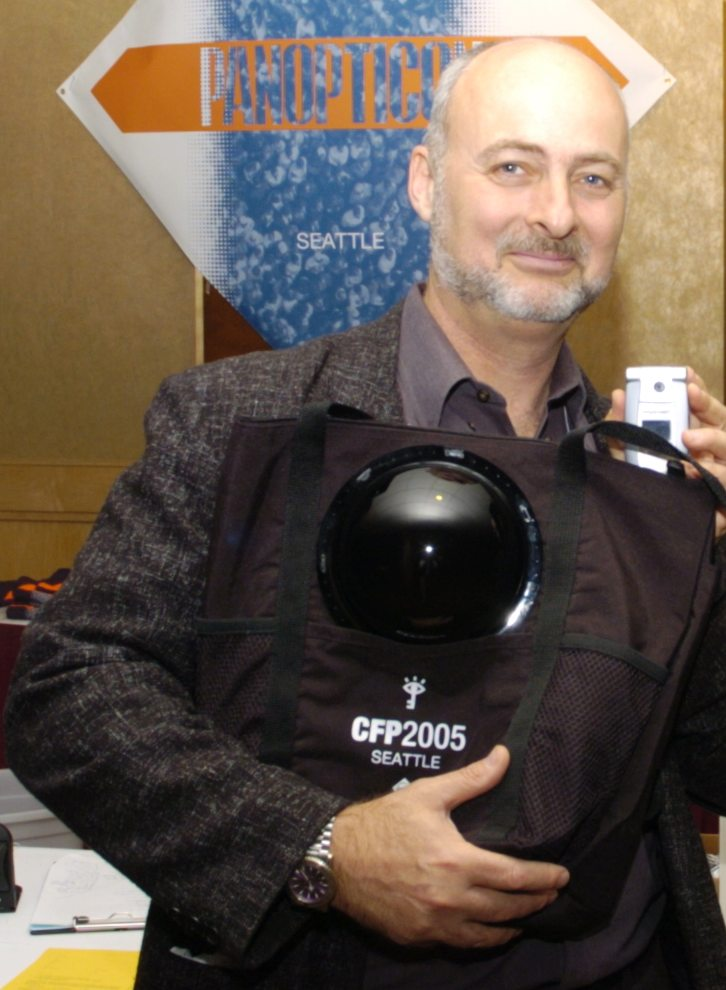
David Brin with sousveillance "maybecamera" at the Association of Computing Machinery's (ACM's) CFP conference where such a sousveillance device was given to each attendee

Brin argues that a core level of privacy—protecting our most intimate interactions—may be preserved, despite the rapid proliferation of cameras that become ever-smaller, cheaper and more numerous faster than Moore's law. He feels that this core privacy can be saved simply because that is what humans deeply need and want. Hence, Brin explains that "...the key question is whether citizens will be potent, sovereign and knowing enough to enforce this deeply human want."

This means they must not only have rights, but also the power to use them and the ability to detect when they are being abused. That will only happen in a world that is mostly open, in which most citizens know most of what is going on, most of the time. It is the only condition under which citizens may have some chance of catching the violators of their freedom and privacy. Privacy is only possible if freedom (including the freedom to know) is protected first.

Brin thus maintains that privacy is a "contingent right," one that grows out of the more primary rights, e.g. to know and to speak. He admits that such a mostly-open world will seem more irksome and demanding; people will be expected to keep negotiating the tradeoffs between knowing and privacy. It will be tempting to pass laws that restrict the power of surveillance to authorities, entrusting them to protect our privacy—or a comforting illusion of privacy. By contrast, a transparent society destroys that illusion by offering everyone access to the vast majority of information out there.

Brin argues that it will be good for society if the powers of surveillance are shared with the citizenry, allowing "sousveillance" or "viewing from below," enabling the public to watch the watchers. According to Brin, this only continues the same trend promoted by Adam Smith, John Locke, the US Constitutionalists and the western enlightenment, who held that any elite (whether commercial, governmental, or aristocratic) should experience constraints upon its power. And there is no power-equalizer greater than knowledge.

== Conceptually related works ==
Brin has introduced versions of the concept into his fiction.

In Earth, the setting's future history includes a war pitting most of the Earth against Switzerland, fueled by outrage over the Swiss allowing generations of kleptocrats to hide their stolen wealth in the country's secretive banks. The war results in the end of secret banking and the destruction of Switzerland as a nation. In the setting's present, surveillance by elderly retirees wearing recognizable networked camera-glasses is common.

His novel Kiln People is set in a future where cameras are everywhere and anyone can access the public ones and, for a fee, the private ones.

== See also ==
- Sousveillance (and inverse surveillance)
- Surveillance
- Transparency (behavior)
