= Gangster Squad =

Gangster Squad can refer to:

- Gangster Squad (LAPD), Los Angeles Police Department unit formed to combat organized crime
- Gangster Squad (film), a 2013 film based on the LAPD unit of the same name
