= River of Time =

River of Time may refer to:

- River of Time (The Judds album) (1989), or the title track
- River of Time (Jorma Kaukonen album) (2009), or the title track
- River of Time (Michael Martin Murphey album) (1988), or the title track
- The River of Time, a 1986 story collection by David Brin
- "River of Time" (Legends of Tomorrow), an episode of Legends of Tomorrow
- River of Time: A Memoir of Vietnam, a book by Jon Swain
- "River of Time", a 2019 song by Jake Owen from Greetings from... Jake

== See also ==
- Rivers of Time, a 1993 collection of short stories by L. Sprague de Camp
