= LAPD Gangster Squad =

Former anti-organized crime unit of the Los Angeles Police Department

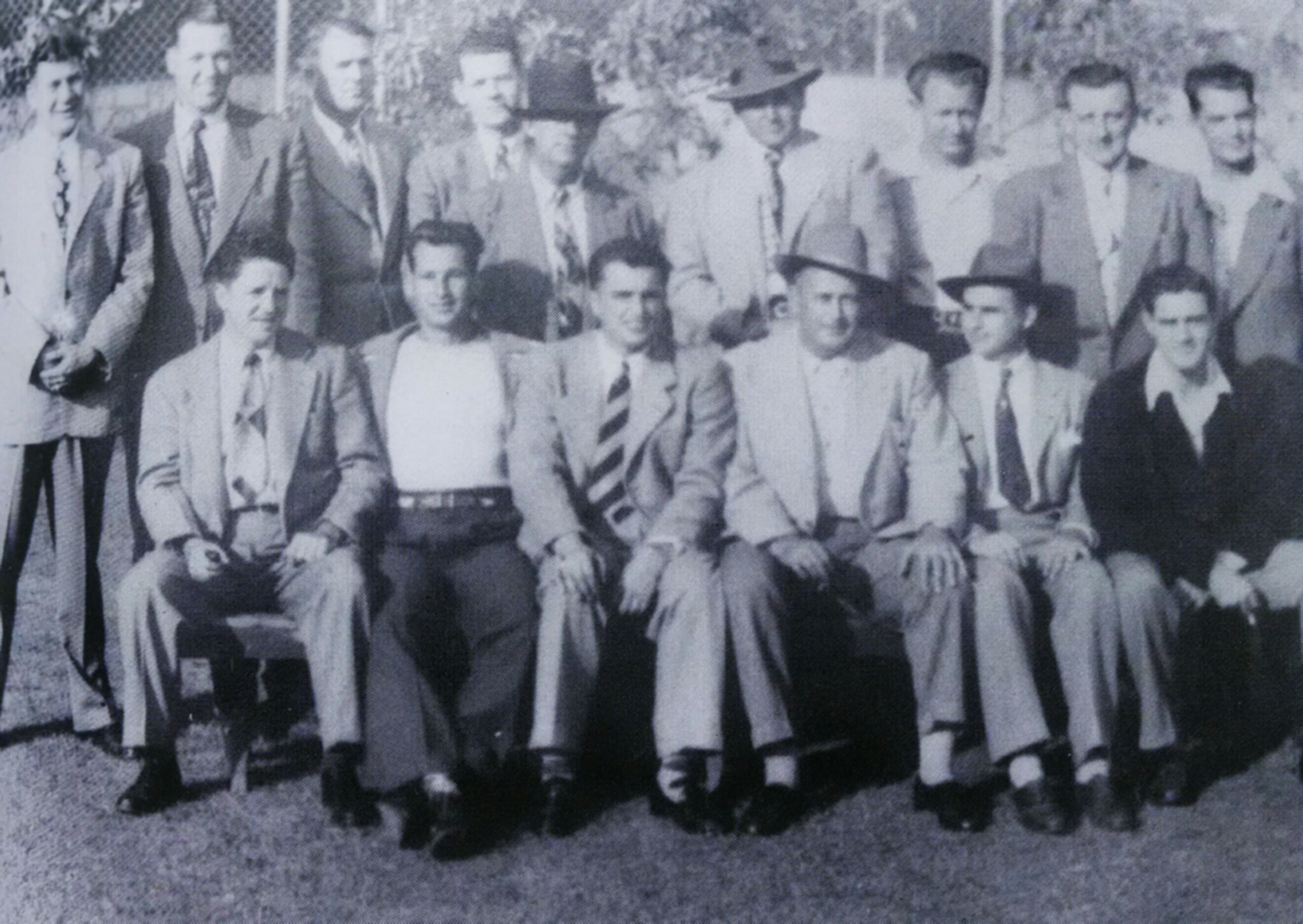
The Gangster Squad in 1948

The Gangster Squad, later known as the Organized Crime Intelligence Division (OCID), was a special unit of the Los Angeles Police Department (LAPD) formed in 1946 to keep the East Coast Mafia and organized crime elements out of Los Angeles, California.

== Origin ==
The squad was created by then Chief of Police Clemence B. Horrall in 1946. Initially organized as an eight-man intelligence detail, it became popularly known as the Gangster Squad. It was given the tasks of fighting organized crime and spying on corrupt cops. Criminals it targeted included Mickey Cohen, Jack Dragna, Bugsy Siegel, Jack Whalen and Jimmy Fratianno.

== History ==
Much like the events in the 2013 film Gangster Squad, the real-life squad waged war on crime and did things that would be considered illegal by today's standards. As the real-life Sgt. Jack O'Mara later told the Los Angeles Times in 2008: "We did a lot of things that we'd get indicted for today". In 1949, interim LAPD Chief William Worton increased the team's size and renamed it the Intelligence Division. William Parker became chief in 1950 and expanded the team even more, including the addition of a female field team.

== In the media ==
- The 2013 action-drama film Gangster Squad is based on the LAPD's Gangster Squad (although with considerable departures from real-life people and events).
- Jack Webb's 1954 film Dragnet is based on the Intelligence Division.
- Author James Ellroy used a different, fictionalized version of the Gangster Squad, the "Mobster Squad", in his L.A. Quartet novels. The team is introduced in L.A. Confidential (1990) and is headed up by corrupt LAPD captain Dudley Smith. Their duties included beating confessions out of suspects, scaring criminals out of town, and controlling and containing crime.
- Similar units are depicted in the 1996 film Mulholland Falls; and in the 2013 miniseries Mob City, where the squad is referred to as "Horrall's gang of thugs".
- In the book L.A's Secret Police: Inside the Elite Spy Network, former OCID detective Mike Rothmiller discusses how, during the 1970s and '80s, the OCID was more interested in celebrities and politicians than actual mobsters. For example, he was denied permission to meet a major mob informant in Las Vegas, while six officers were staked out a politician's beach house because of possible homosexual activity.
- The 1950 film 711 Ocean Drive depicts the Gangster Squad investigating a horserace betting syndicate.
