= Otherness (book) =

1994 science fiction anthology by David Brin

- Author: David Brin
- Original title: Otherness
- Language: English
- Genre: Science fiction
- Publisher: Orbit
- Publication date: 1994
- Media type: Print
- ISBN: 1-85723-310-7
- OCLC: 49804636

Otherness (1994) is an anthology of science fiction short stories by American writer David Brin. Interspersed in the book are notes on some stories and other short articles by Brin, most notably The Dogma of Otherness.

== Contents ==
Stories

- "The Giving Plague" (first published in 1988)
- "Myth Number 21" (excerpted from Earth, first published in 1990)
- "Dr. Pak's Preschool" (first published in 1990)
- "Detritus Affected" (first published in 1992)
- "Sshhh ..." (first published in 1988)
- "Those Eyes"
- "Bonding to Genji" (first published in 1992)
- "The Warm Space" (first published in 1985)
- "NatuLife " (first published in 1993)
- "Piecework" (first published in 1988)
- "Bubbles" (first published in 1987)
- "Ambiguity" (first published in 1990)
- "What Continues ... and What Fails ..." (first published in 1991)

Articles

- "The Dogma of Otherness"
- "What to Say to a UFO"
- "Whose Millennium?"
- "Science versus Magic"
- "The Commonwealth of Wonder"

== Reception ==
Chris Gilmore in his 1995 review of the book in Foundation: The International Review of Science Fiction noted that "there's much to praise here", but also criticized the book for being premature, noting that if the author delayed the publication by several years, stronger stories could have replaced some weaker ones.

The collection won the Locus Award for Best Collection in 1995.
