= Jeremy Luke =

American actor

- Born: March 23, 1977 (age 49); Staten Island, New York, U.S.
- Occupation: Actor
- Years active: 2001–present

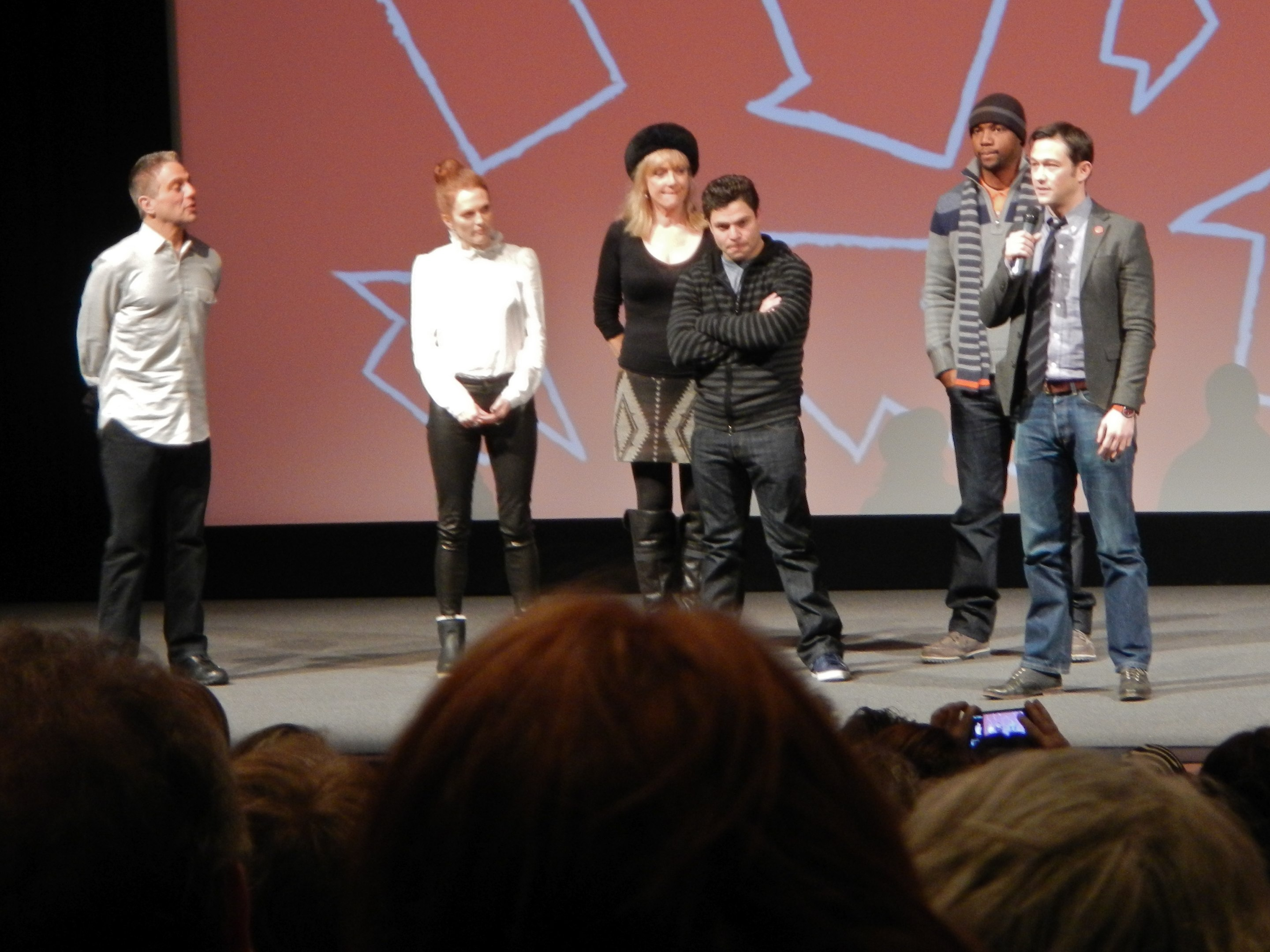
Tony Danza, Julianne Moore, Glenne Headley, Jeremy Luke, Rob Brown and Joseph Gordon-Levitt

Jeremy Luke (born March 23, 1977) is an American actor, best known for his roles as Danny in Don Jon and as Mickey Cohen in the TNT series Mob City.

== Early life ==
Luke was born and raised in Staten Island, New York. He attended the College of Staten Island and went on to have a successful career as a Night Club promoter. Luke first became an actor as a stress outlet and eventually made it his full profession. He has described his ancestry as "Puerto Rican, Italian, and Jewish".

== Career ==
For the first decade of his career, Luke mostly had small guest roles in television series such as Judging Amy, NYPD Blue, ER, Las Vegas, and Desperate Housewives. He received his first major role in the Syfy television film Jersey Shore Shark Attack.

In 2013, he had a supporting role in Don Jon, which was directed by and starred Joseph Gordon-Levitt. He also played the role of Mickey Cohen in the TNT television series Mob City, which was created by director and writer Frank Darabont.

In 2019, he appeared in Martin Scorsese’s film, The Irishman, as Marco Rossi.

Luke also appeared as Paulie Lombardo in the 2020 action-adventure video game Mafia: Definitive Edition, a remake of the 2002 video game, where he also lent his voice, likeness and motion capture performance. Luke was also in the movie Poor Greg Drowning in 2020.

== Filmography ==
=== Film ===
Year	Title	Role	Notes
2001	The Myersons	Murph	
2002	Big Shot: Confessions of a Campus Bookie	Nick	TV movie
2003	Mike's Kids	Angelo	
2004	Study Hall	Calvin	Short
2005	Ordinary Miracles	Henry Watson	TV movie
2008	Interpretation	Mouth	Short
2008	The Deadliest Lesson	Benny	TV movie
2008	Klondike Bar	-	Short
2008	Cab Fare	-	Short
2008	Cigarettes	-	Short
2008	Deep Dish	-	Short
2008	Will-Endowed	White William	Short
2009	Difficult to Stay Alive and Die	Ninja	Short
2010	Detention	Benny	
2010	Holyman Undercover	Pinky	
2010	Sinatra Club	Rocky	
2010	Santa Preys for X-mas	Detective Patari	Short
2011	Just Add Blood	Jason	Short
2011	Tunnel Vision	Accent	Short
2012	Fuzz Track City	J-Rock	
2012	Jersey Shore Shark Attack	Gino "The Complication" Moretti	
2012	Brutal	Mikey T	
2012	Cocaine Time Machine	Bobby	Short
2013	Don Jon	Danny	
2013	The Smile Man	Shorty	Short
2013	Wedding Palace	Miguel	
2013	Mikeyboy	Turbo	
2013	A Private Act	Alfonso Febres Ruiz	Short
2014	ETXR	Danny Fishmonger	
2014	Jersey Boys	Donnie	
2015	Broken Horses	Franco	
2015	The Networker	Peter	
2015	How Sarah Got Her Wings	Stuart	
2016	Sully	Victor Gaggero	
2016	Consult and Conquer	Jimmy	Short
2017	The Fuzz	Jay Rock	
2017	The Fix	Eric	
2018	Poor Greg Drowning	Paul	
2019	Polyvore	Elliot	Short
2019	The Irishman	Marco Rossi	
2019	Scott & Lenny go to Thai Town	Lenny	Short
2021	The Artist	Michael	Short
2022	A Place in the Field	LT. Sylvestre	
2022	The Disappearance of Toby Blackwood	Paul Balducci	
2023	Inside Man	Louis Russo	
2023	The Featherweight	Rocky Marciano	
2023	Murder Motel	Mickey	
2024	Jersey Bred	Frankie Carbone	
2025	The Vortex	Johnnie B	
2025	The Old Breed	John Wilcox	Short
2025	The Mother, the Menacer, and Me	Bob Hawkins	

=== Television ===
Year	Title	Role	Notes
2001	Judging Amy	Second Kid	Episode: "Look Closer"
2003	Presidio Med	Alonzo	Episode: "Best of Enemies"
2003	NYPD Blue	J.J. Flaherty	Episode: "Only Schmucks Pay Income Tax"
2004	The Division	Brian Anders	Episode: "That's Them"
2004	Dr. Vegas	Rick	Episode: "All In"
2006	Bones	Eddie Bean	Episode: "The Titan on the Tracks"
2006	Close to Home	Dave Gahr	Episode: "Community"
2006	Shark	Phone Guy	Episode: "LAPD Blue"
2006	CSI: NY	Randy Kern	Episode: "Murder Sings the Blues"
2007	ER	Thomas Grasso	Episode: "Dying is Easy"
2007	Everybody Hates Chris	Thug	Episode: "Everybody Hates the Guidance Counselor"
2008	Las Vegas	Dealer Mickey	Recurring Cast: Season 5
2008	Kath & Kim	Todd	Recurring Cast
2011	The Baby	Ray	Recurring Cast: Season 1
2011	Desperate Housewives	Jimmy	Episode: "Putting It Together"
2012	Touch	Dealer	Episode: "Noosphere Rising"
2012	Melissa & Joey	Raphael	Episode: "I Can Manage"
2012	Hawaii Five-0	Nicky Bova	Episode: "I Ka Wa Mamua (In a Time Past)"
2013	BlackBoxTV Presents	Mikey	Episode: "Up to Here"
2013	Mob City	Mickey Cohen	Main Cast
2013	It's You Not Me	Tommy	Episode: "Meet Her, Meet Him"
2013	Turbo and Joey	Turbo	Main Cast
2014	Blue Bloods	Det. Douglas	Episode: "Unfinished Business"
2014	HollyWayne	Lou Means	Episode: "The Interrogation"
2015	JustBoobs Sketch	Himself	Episode: "Guys Acting Like Girls on Valentine's Day"
2015	Hot Girl Walks By	Rocco	Episode: "Wannabes in a Parking Lot"
2016	Driving Arizona	Georgi	Episode: "Tour de Tempe, AZ"
2016	Glimpses of Greg	Paul	Episode: "Roommate in Training"
2017	Small Shots	Turbo	Main Cast
2017	Lethal Weapon	Tony Guzman	Episode: "Let it Ride"
2017-18	This Is Us	Darryl Magee	Guest Cast: Season 1 & 3
2023	Ghosts	Al Capone	Episode: "Whodunnit"
2023	The Company You Keep	Otto	Recurring Cast
2024	Abbott Elementary	Anthony	Episode: "Winter Break"

=== Video games ===
Year	Title	Role
2004	Outlaw Golf 2	(voice)
2020	Mafia: Definitive Edition	Paulie Lombardo (motion capture and voice)
