= L.A. Noir =

L.A. Noir may refer to:

- L.A. Noir, a 1997 collected edition of the Lloyd Hopkins trilogy of novels by James Ellroy
- L.A. Noir: The Struggle for the Soul of America's Most Seductive City, a 2009 non-fiction book by John Buntin
  - Mob City, a 2013 television dramatization of the book, which had the working title L.A. Noir
- L.A. Noire, a 2011 video game
