= The Crystal Spheres =

Award-winning short story by David Brin

- Short story by David Brin
- Language: English
- Genre: Science fiction

Publication
- Published in: Analog
- Publication date: January 1984

"The Crystal Spheres" is a science fiction short story by American writer David Brin, originally published in the January 1984 issue of Analog and collected in The River of Time. It won the Hugo Award for Best Short Story 1985. In it, Brin presents an explanation for the Fermi Paradox.

== Plot summary ==
Humanity's first attempt at interstellar space travel ends in disaster as the ship is destroyed near the edge of the Solar System by a transparent barrier. After breaking that barrier, humanity eventually comes to realize that all Earth-like solar systems have an undetectable "crystal sphere" surrounding them, while uninhabitable systems do not. Every attempt to break a sphere around another system from the outside fails. Radio waves and other attempts at communication from the outside are blocked as well. Humanity is thus prevented from expanding and colonizing the universe, as well as from communicating with any intelligent life that is inside such a sphere.

The main character takes part in an expedition to a newly discovered habitable solar system with a shattered sphere. They discover the remnants of an alien civilization, the Nataral. From studying the Nataral's artifacts and writings, they learn that the only way to break the crystal spheres is from the inside. It appears as if the spheres have been put in place by someone/something to prevent any one single civilization from dominating the universe. It is also discovered that the Nataral chose to go into a kind of suspended animation around a black hole, joining two even earlier species, to wait for the other civilizations of the universe to develop interstellar flight capabilities that would enable them to "break out of their eggs".

== Authors notes ==
In the author notes for this story, Brin outlines both sides of the Fermi paradox. He contrasts the Uniqueness view of Frank Tipler with the Contact view of Carl Sagan, and records some of the acrimony that surrounds the debate on the subject. He says he has won no friends by saying, in effect, “that we might gain more by careful thought and data collection than by yelling at each other.”
