= Glory Season =

1993 science fiction novel by David Brin

- Cover of first American edition (Bantam Books, 1993, hardcover)
- Author: David Brin
- Language: English
- Genre: Science fiction novel
- Publisher: Orbit Books
- Publication date: 1993
- Publication place: United States
- Media type: Print (hardback & paperback)
- ISBN: 0-553-07645-0
- OCLC: 27684132
- Dewey Decimal: 813/.54 20
- LC Class: PS3552.R4825 G56 1993

Glory Season is a 1993 science fiction novel by David Brin. It was nominated for both the Hugo and Locus Awards in 1994. An announcement in the back of one edition of Earth is for a novel titled Stratos, to be released in the spring of 1992. It seems likely that this was delayed, and renamed Glory Season.

== Plot summary ==
Three thousand years before the story starts, Lysos founds a human colony on the isolated planet of Stratos in an effort to radically re-engineer human life into a happier, more pastoral form. She developed a strain of human beings that conceives clones in winter (always female), while those conceived in summer (variants or "vars") obtain their genes through sexual reproduction just in case biological adaptation becomes necessary. Further, males and females have opposed seasons of sexual receptivity: men in summer and women in winter. This scheme is said to be stable over evolutionary time because women gain an advantage from self-cloning, while men only reproduce in summer. Finally, men have been made far less aggressive during the times that they are less sexually receptive and are much less numerous. The social result is that the vast majority of the population of Stratos consists of groups of female clones, each in its own social or economic niche. Over the centuries, these groups have come to dominate society. Men are confined to relatively few professions (such as sailing) and have a lower social status than clones, but higher than vars. In each generation, a few women vars become successful enough to found their own clan or "hive" of clones.

As is customary, clones are trained to carry on their clan's business, while vars leave as young adults to seek their fortune. It is time for identical twins Maia and Leie to enter the outside world. They plan to work as sailors to gain experience and explore Stratos, find their niche, and found a clan. Almost immediately, they hit a snag. The only two ship's captains willing to take them on at that time insist they split up, because they cannot have it appear to their clone passengers that clones are doing lowly ship's work. The ships are traveling together. Aboard, Maia meets Naroin, a highly competent female bosun's mate. Later, Leie's ship is lost in a storm. Maia is heartbroken and seriously injured, but eventually recuperates and finds a job on a railroad.

On the railroad, Maia discovers her var temporary assistant is actually a clone courier and courtesan running illegal drugs. The drugs are designed to shift a man's period of sexual interest. They are part of a plot by reactionary "Perkinites" (named after Charlotte Perkins Gilman, author of Herland) to minimize the role of men in an isolated valley, and perhaps later all of Stratos.

Maia notifies the "Planetary Equilibrium Authority", but is kidnapped and imprisoned by the Perkinites. She discovers that Renna, a prisoner in another cell, is transmitting messages electrically. She talks with Renna by code and develops a friendship with her unseen fellow inmate. When she discovers that Renna is being transferred somewhere else, Maia engineers her escape, only to find that idealistic radicals ("rads") and their allies have already freed Renna, who is actually the "Visitor," a male envoy from the rest of humanity whose arrival has triggered great debate among the leaders of Stratos as to how to respond to the renewed - and unwanted - contact. She tags along with Renna and the rads.

A platonic friendship develops between Renna and Maia. Their group, which includes Naroin, is later overtaken at sea by pirates (pirating being a tolerated, legal activity). During the ensuing boarding fight, Maia is shocked when she encounters her sister, one of the pirates. The pirates win, with the help of traitors planted in the rads' group. They strand many of their female prisoners, including Maia and Naroin, and one young male sailor named Brod on a deserted island and take Renna, their prize, to a secret base.

After the castaways manage to ambush pirates sent to eliminate all witnesses, they sail off to alert the authorities, but Maia, accompanied only by Brod, sets out to try to rescue Renna. They inadvertently stumble upon the pirate base. While secretly reconnoitering it, Maia helps free more prisoners, including the rads and the crew of her ship. She also learns that Renna has somehow escaped. More fighting breaks out when their enemies learn the rest of their prisoners are loose. In the turmoil, Maia and her allies are cornered, but she finds a secret exit which leads to the long-lost "Jellicoe Former", an advanced manufacturing facility that can produce anything. Renna is killed when the spaceship he found and completed at Jellicoe Former explodes soon after its launch. Maia is severely injured in the battle. The police and other interested parties arrive to save the survivors of Maia's side.

While recuperating, Maia is dragged into politics and kept a prisoner discreetly by one clan because she has become a symbol. She tells her story to a group of male heads of sailing clans. One of them turns out to be the father she had never known. For her actions, they offer her "clan" an alliance. At the end, with Renna dead, Maia becomes an embarrassment to her captors, so she is allowed to walk away free. She decides that she will not found a clan of clones, but rather have offspring the old way.

== Major themes ==
The nature of the novel is a subject of some contention, some believing that the setting is a feminist utopia, others holding it to be a dystopian work functioning as a post-feminist critique of feminism. The structure of the society is complex enough to make either interpretation possible, though the society's origin and structure is based on an extreme of separatist feminism. Also, the structure of the society as seen within the narrative supports the view of biological determinism when it comes to the relationship between genetics and gender roles.

The author, in the novel's afterword, explains that the idea for the society in which the story takes place originated from a study of reproductive cycle of aphids, which is heterogamous. Aphids alternate between asexual reproduction in the summer, i.e., when the environment is favorable and there is plenty of food, and sexually in the fall when the organism is stressed by its environment. This has the biological advantage of ensuring identical copies of the parent will be well suited to take advantage of the favorable conditions, and variation in offspring in a stressful environment in hopes some of the offspring will find the environment favorable, even when the parents do not. The entire social construct in the novel is therefore an extrapolation of this idea onto a human culture, where successful female clans (female, because only they can produce offspring) can take advantage of their sociological niches by producing exact copies, and unsuccessful females produce variable offspring sexually.

== See also ==
- Conway's Game of Life – Two-dimensional cellular automaton, the inspiration for the game called Life in the book
- Virgin Planet – an SF novel by Poul Anderson where a male explorer stumbles across a lost planet of all women who reproduce by cloning themselves
