= Sshhh ... =

Short story by David Brin

"Sshhh ..." was the cover story for the May 1989 issue of Amazing Stories, illustrated by George Barr

"Sshhh ..." is a science fiction short story by David Brin about humanity's first contact with an alien race. It was first published in Amazing Stories in 1988 and appears in the Brin's 1997 anthology Otherness.

The story opens with 2 Earth Survey vessels escorting Lentili starships to Earth. The Lentili are a race of tall, long-lived aliens who are far more technologically and philosophically advanced than humans, who have only recently ventured to the stars. While the Lentili are en route to Earth, Earth President Tridden makes a planetwide announcement. He reveals that an eminent psychologist has discovered that the Lentili, for all their power, lack a certain talent possessed by humans. This talent is apparently rare and almost unthinkable among galactic races. Tridden will not reveal exactly what this talent is, but describes it as "something so mundane to us that few human beings ever bother even thinking about it past the age of ten!" This talent can wreak "untold psychic harm" among the Lentili and he asks the people of Earth to join him in making a "great sacrifice."

Tridden asks the human race to remove all mention of this talent from literature and from daily life. But since lingering references and, indeed, copies of his broadcast will survive, the human race must also provide a good "cover story" to explain away this situation. Tridden announces that it will be recorded that he has gone insane. There is no talent and the chaos will be the result of Tridden's insanity. Tridden, seeing that he is about to be removed from the air, puts his finger to his lips in one final gesture of secrecy.

The story is open-ended, leaving the reader to wonder whether Tridden pulled off a marvelous scheme to help humanity weather an ego crisis when faced with the superior Lentili, or whether humanity really does have a unique talent.
