= Heart of the Comet =

1986 novel by Gregory Benford and David Brin

- Author: David Brin and Gregory Benford
- Illustrator: April Abrams and David Perry
- Language: English
- Genre: Science Fiction
- Publisher: Bantam Spectra
- Publication date: 1986
- Publication place: United States and Canada
- Media type: Print
- Pages: 477
- ISBN: 0-553-25839-7

Heart of the Comet is a novel by David Brin and Gregory Benford about human space travel to Halley's Comet published in 1986. Its publication coincided with the comet's 1986 approach to the Earth.

Written in the third person, the perspective alternates between the three main characters, the "spacer" Carl Osborn, the computer programmer Virginia Herbert and the doctor and geneticist Saul Lintz.

== Overview ==
The novel tells the story of an expedition beginning in the year 2061 to capture Halley's Comet into a short period orbit so that its resources can be mined. The discovery of life on the comet and the subsequent survival struggle against the indigenous lifeforms and the illnesses and infections they cause leads to a breakdown of the expedition crew and the creation of factions based around political beliefs, nationality and genetic differences between the "percells"—genetically enhanced humans—and the "orthos"—unmodified humans. As well as the fighting between these factions, Earth rejects the mission due to fear of contamination from the halleyform life and attempts to destroy the comet and those living upon it. Eventually the mission crew on Halley are forced to accept that they can never return to Earth and create a new biosphere within the comet's core and in some cases evolve into symbiotic organisms with the halleyform life.

Subplots within the novel include the love triangle between the three major characters, Saul's quest for immortality through the creation of clones of himself and Virginia's development and nurture of the bio-organic stochastic computer JonVon, into whom Saul eventually transfers her consciousness before her brain dies as a result of an accident. The description of many of the interactions with JonVon and this final transference of consciousness is similar to the descriptions of the matrix in the William Gibson novel Neuromancer.

== Characters ==
=== Main ===
- Carl Osborn - spacer, percell
- Virginia Kaninamanu Herbert - computer programmer, percell
- Saul Lintz - doctor and geneticist, ortho

=== Minor characters ===
- Miguel Cruz-Mendoza - Captain of the Edmund Halley, ortho
- Otis Sergeov - Spacer Second Class, percell
- Joao Quiverian - astronomer, ortho
- Lt. Col. Suleiman Ould-Harrad - spacer, ortho
- Lani Nguyen - spacer, ortho
- Jeffers - spacer, percell
- Akio Matsudo - doctor
- Bethany Oakes - doctor
- Nickolas Malenkov - doctor
- Marguerite van/von Zoon - doctor
- Jim Vidor - spacer
- Ingersoll - percell
- Linbarger - doctor, ortho
- Keoki Anuenue - med-tech, ortho

=== Background characters ===
- Simon Percell - geneticist
- JonVon - quasi-sentient computer personality

== Themes ==
As an example of the hard science fiction subgenre, the story is meant to be scientifically plausible. Social and political issues such as racism and diaspora are also present, as well as social arguments surrounding issues such as genetic engineering and cloning and exploration of more philosophical subjects such as immortality and transhumanism.
