= Jack Whalen =

American criminal (1918–1959)

- Born: May 11, 1918; Missouri, U.S.
- Died: December 2, 1959 (aged 41); Sherman Oaks, California, U.S.
- Spouse: Kay Sabichi (m. 1943)
- Military career
- Allegiance: United States
- Branch: United States Army Air Forces
- Service years: 1944–1946
- Nickname: The Enforcer
- Conflicts: World War II
- Other work: Mob Contract Killer

Jack Whalen (May 11, 1918 – December 2, 1959), also called Jack O'Hara and "The Enforcer," was a criminal and freelance contract killer and bookie, who worked for the Los Angeles crime family, although he also was associated with Benjamin "Bugsy" Siegel, the Shannon brothers (Joe, Izzy, Moe, and Max) and Mickey Cohen during the 1940s and 1950s.

== Life ==
Jack F. Whalen was born in Missouri on May 11, 1918. Whalen's father, Fred—who was also a career criminal—had enrolled Jack in military school to give his son a better life. Jack played polo in school and piloted bombers in World War II. After the war, he married into a rich family in Los Angeles; however, by 1955, his own criminal career had begun. He was soon called "The Enforcer" because he was "so tough he didn't need a gun."

== Death ==
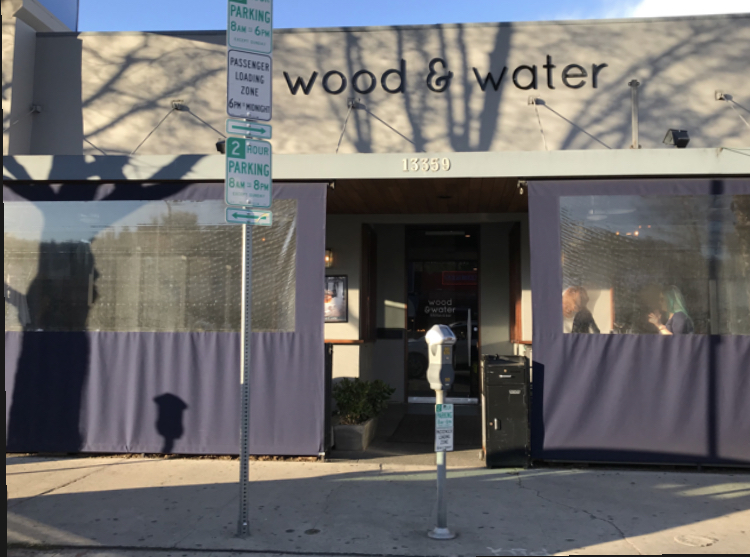
The modern location of Whalen's death, shown here in 2019

On December 2, 1959, Whalen was shot "square between the eyes" and killed at Rondelli's restaurant in Sherman Oaks in the presence of Mickey Cohen and three other of his associates. Sam Frank LoCigno, although claiming self-defense, was charged with, but later acquitted of, the murder. Whalen was 41 years old at the time of his death.

== In popular culture ==
Whalen is depicted in the 2013 film Gangster Squad by actor Sullivan Stapleton. Whalen is also a featured character in James Ellroy's novel L.A. Confidential; as part of the power struggle for Mickey Cohen's criminal empire against gangster Morris "Mo" Jahelka.
