= Ajay Mehta =

Indian actor based in North America

- Born: New Delhi, India
- Occupation: Actor
- Website: http://www.ajaymehta.tv/

Ajay Mehta (/ˈɑːdʒeɪ ˈmɛtə/ AH-jay MET-ə) () is an Indian actor based in North America, known for his deep baritone voice.

== Early life and education ==
Mehta was born in New Delhi, India and he was educated in New Delhi, in Mayo College and St. Stephen's College. According to a 2010 interview, he wanted to be an actor since he was three and a half years old and participated in plays while attending college.

== Career ==
He has appeared in many television shows, including The Mentalist, Eli Stone, Without a Trace, The Sopranos, Sex and the City, NCIS, Anger Management, The Middle, Rules of Engagement, Nip/Tuck, Numb3rs, CSI: NY, Royal Pains, Modern Family, The Good Place, Rectify and Outsourced. He played a Middle Eastern ambassador on 24. He played Citigroup CEO Vikram Pandit in the television movie Too Big to Fail, which was broadcast in the United States on HBO. He appeared as an auctioneer on 2 Broke Girls in September 2012, and as the prime minister of India in G.I. Joe: Retaliation in 2013. He also appears in the video game Far Cry 4.

In 2007, Ajay was cast as an ad campaign spokesman for Fiber One brand products.

From 2012 to 2014, he guest starred as Lacey's father, Sanjay on the TV show Anger Management. Starring alongside Charlie Sheen, Selma Blaire, Martin Sheen, and Brian Austin Green.

== Partial filmography ==
- Lonely in America (1990) - Confectionary shop owner
- Shao nu Xiao Yu (1995) - Photo store manager
- Mercy (1995) - Taxi Driver
- Taxi Bhaiya (1996) - Taxi Bhai
- The Last Days of Disco (1998) - Pharmacist
- Star of Jaipur (1998) - Captain Kaushik
- Tales of The Kama Sutra 2: Monsoon (1999) - Inspector General Ranjeet Singh
- Chutney Popcorn (1999) - Dr. Sud
- Just One Time (1999) - Husan
- Astoria (2000) - Lawyer
- The Sopranos (2000) - Sundeep
- Serendipity (2001) - Pakistani Cab Driver
- Spider-Man (2002) - Cabbie #1
- The Guru (2002) - Swami Bu
- Penny Ante (2002) - Detective Lawford
- People I Know (2002) - Cab Driver
- Looking for Comedy in the Muslim World (2005) - Indian Official
- Americanizing Shelley (2007) - Jaspal Singh
- 24 (2007) - Middle Eastern Ambassador
- Ocean of Pearls (2008) - Ravinder Singh
- Superhero Movie (2008) - Convenience Store Owner
- The Ode (2008) - Mr. Surani
- Lakeview Terrace (2008) - Doctor
- Ashes (2010) - Mr. Patel
- Happy Feet Two (2011) - Indian Penguin (voice, uncredited)
- Troublemaker (2011) - Dev
- Too Big to Fail (film) (2011) - Vikram Pandit, CEO do Citigroup
- The Son of an Afghan Farmer (2012) - Mr. Amir
- G.I. Joe: Retaliation (2013) - Indian Prime Minister
- Decoding Annie Parker (2013) - OB / GYN Doctor
- Trainwreck (2015) - Dr. Raj
- 68 Kill (2017) - Sam
- Poor Greg Drowning (2018) - Dr. Naik
