= The Practice Effect =

1984 novel by David Brin

- First edition cover
- Author: David Brin
- Original title: The Practice Effect
- Cover artist: Peter Goodfellow
- Language: English
- Genre: Science fiction
- Publisher: Bantam Books
- Publication date: 1984
- Media type: Print
- ISBN: 978-0-553-23992-8
- OCLC: 10574112

The Practice Effect is a novel by David Brin, written in 1984. The story involves a world in which entropy works in reverse.

== Plot summary ==
A scientist by the name of Dennis Nuel is working at, and attending, an institute of scientific research and pioneering work into the fictional scientific field of "Zievatronics", the manipulation of Time and Space. After the death of his mentor, however, he is taken off the project and another professor takes over.

After a time, the device that has been created to move through space and time, known as the "Zievatron" encounters operational problems and is fixed to the co-ordinates of a world that appears to be very similar to the Earth in most respects, and Dennis is re-recruited to help fix it. He volunteers to be sent to the other world in order to fix the other part of the Zievatron. On arriving to this planet, he finds the Zievatron dismantled and critical parts of it missing. Of the three surveillance robots sent through to this planet, he finds two have also been broken apart. After a while, he finds the last robot, intact and still functioning, and uses it to view any recorded images that might help him identify what it was that happened to the Zievatron.

In this world, instead of objects wearing out as you use them, they improve. This is referred to as the Practice Effect. For example, swords get sharper with use, baskets get stronger the more things they carry, mirrors, furniture and decorations look more attractive the more they are looked at. The physical structure of objects changes in a way so as to become a better version of its previous existence with Practice, like the growth and evolution of a life form. The downside is that an object's condition deteriorates over time if not put to use. Under the prevailing social system, members of society's higher strata exert ownership over objects that they do not improve themselves but rather employ servants to improve by use of the Practice Effect.

It is eventually discovered that the Practice Effect is the result of an elusive, biologically-engineered creature known as a Krenegee Beast that causes a change in a law of thermodynamics. This creature emits a field under which the Practice Effect works. The closer one is to the Krenegee Beasts, the more efficient the Practice that is done. The Practice Effect can take many months before an object reaches its maximum point of "practice", but the process is sped up if one is under a Felthesh Trance. The presence of a Krenegee Beast speeds up the process more than a Felthesh Trance.

== Table of contents ==
The chapter titles are all jokes, some puns, most in Latin with one (ch. 6) in French. The translations are included.

1. Sooee generis – "'Sooee' is a classic call farmers would use to summon pigs for a meal. Pixolet resembles a pig. Hence "Sooee Generis" is a one-of-a-kind pig."
2. Cogito, ergo tutti frutti – "'Cogito, Ergo Tutti Frutti' refers to a flavor of ice cream and hence stands for "I think, therefore I scream," which is spelled out in the chapter."
3. Nom de Terre – tr. 'name of the land' but in the context of the chapter a play on 'Nom de Guerre'. This is also a pun on 'pomme de terre' the french word for potato which translates directly to, apple of the earth. The name of the planet being 'Tater' a common slang for potato. Making the nomme de terre a pomme de terre.
4. The best way to Carnegie Hall – (... is practice)
5. Transom dental – a play on 'transcendental' "'Transom Dental' - refers to the chapter's chief event, practicing dental floss into a cutting tool that lets characters escape over a wall. A transom was a window that would open part way over an office door to let in air. Hence the phrase "I got in over the transom" meant "I used an unconventional means to pass over a barrier." Combining that with dental floss offers a pun on 'transcendental' surpassing an obstacle."
6. Ballon d'essai – trial balloon
7. Pundit Nero – Pandit Nehru, first Prime Minister of India.
8. "Eurekaarrgh" – a more accurate variation of 'eureka' A portmanteau of eureka and arrgh, a commonly used distressed scream in literature
9. Discus jestus – majesty Disc. An alternate Latin meaning, in the chapter context: "Quoit Jester" = "Court Jester"
10. Sic biscuitus disintegratum – or 'this is how the cookie crumbles'
11. Et two toots – or 'Et tu, Brute?'
12. Semper ubi sub ubi – tr. 'always where under where' but in the context of the chapter, 'always wear underwear'

== Reception ==
Algis Budrys found the novel's premise appealing, praising Brin's "really first-rate SFnal idea," but its execution disappointing, leaving little of interest but plot details once the central mystery was explained at the novel's midpoint, "and as a plotsmith Brin is just another guy." The SF Encyclopedia considers it "less successful" than Brin's series work, and notes that its premise is "oddly Lamarckian". Charlie Jane Anders, however, has cited it as a work that will "make [the reader] more passionate about science".
