= Mickey Cohen =

Crime boss (1914–1976)

Meyer Cohen
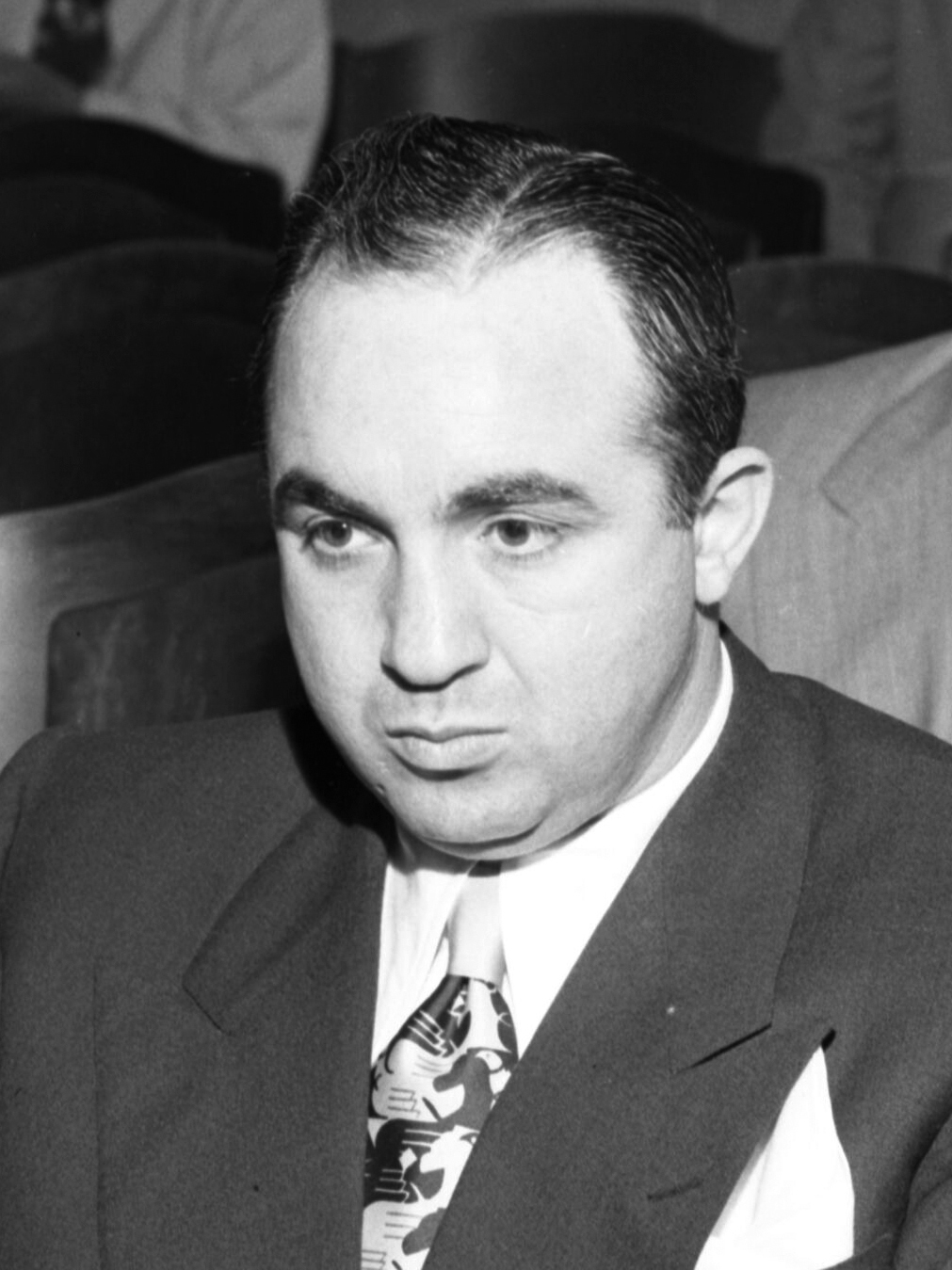
- Cohen in 1949 at his arraignment
- Born: Meyer Harris Cohen; September 4, 1913; New York City, U.S.
- Died: July 29, 1976 (aged 62); Los Angeles, California, U.S.
- Resting place: Hillside Memorial Park Cemetery, Culver City, California
- Occupation: Crime boss
- Height: 5 ft 5 in (165 cm)
- Spouse: Lavonne Weaver (m. 1940)

Meyer Harris "Mickey" Cohen (September 4, 1913 – July 29, 1976) was an American mobster based in Los Angeles and boss of the Cohen crew during the mid-20th century.

== Early life ==
Mickey Cohen was born on September 4, 1913, in New York City to Jewish parents. Cohen's parents immigrated to the US from Kiev in the Russian Empire (present-day Ukraine). Cohen was the youngest of six children, his father died in 1915 when he was just a toddler. He was first raised in New York, moving with his mother and siblings to the Boyle Heights neighborhood of Los Angeles at an early age. At 8, he earned money as a newsboy, selling newspapers on the street. One of his brothers, either Louie or Harry, would drop Mickey off at his regular corner, Soto and Brooklyn Streets (later Cesar E. Chavez Avenue). In 1922, Mickey was sent to reform school for petty crimes including shoplifting and theft.

== Boxing career ==
As a teenager, Cohen began boxing in illegal prize fights in Los Angeles. In 1929, the 15-year-old moved from Los Angeles to Cleveland to train as a professional boxer with the alias of 'Irish Mickey Cohen'. His first professional boxing match was on April 8, 1930, against Patsy Farr in Cleveland. It was one of the preliminary fights on the card for the Paul Pirrone versus Jimmy Goodrich feature bout. In a match on June 12, 1931, Cohen fought and lost against future world featherweight champion Tommy Paul. Cohen was knocked out cold after 2:20 into the first round. It was during this contest that he earned the moniker "Gangster Mickey Cohen". On April 11, 1933, Cohen fought against Chalky Wright in Los Angeles. Wright won the match, and Mickey was incorrectly identified as "Mickey Cohen from Denver, Colorado" in the Los Angeles Times sports page report. His last fight was on May 14, 1933, against Baby Arizmendi in Tijuana, Mexico. He finished his career at 8-8 and 5 draws – 8 wins, 2 by knockout, 8 losses, 4 losses by knockout and 5 draws.

== Criminal career ==
In Cleveland, Cohen met Lou Rothkopf, an associate of Moe Dalitz. Cohen later moved to New York, where he became an associate of labor racketeer Johnny Dio's brother, Tommy Dioguardi, and Owney Madden.

=== Prohibition and the Chicago Outfit ===
During Prohibition, Cohen moved to Chicago and became involved in organized crime, working as an enforcer for the Chicago Outfit, where he briefly met Al Capone. During this period, Cohen was arrested for his role in the deaths of several gangsters at a card game. After a brief time in prison, Cohen was released and began running card games and other illegal gambling operations. He later became an associate of Capone's younger brother, Mattie Capone. While working for Jake Guzik, Cohen was forced to flee Chicago after an argument with a rival gambler. In Cleveland, Cohen worked once more for Lou Rothkopf, an associate of Meyer Lansky and Bugsy Siegel. However, there was little work available for Cohen in Cleveland, so Lansky and Rothkopf arranged for Cohen to work with Siegel in Los Angeles.

=== From syndicate bodyguard to Sunset Strip kingpin ===
In 1939, Cohen arrived in Los Angeles to work under Siegel, a sitting boss of the National Crime Syndicate. During their association, Cohen helped set up the Flamingo Hotel in Las Vegas and ran its sports book operation. He was also instrumental in setting up the race wire, essential to Vegas betting. During this time, Cohen met prostitute Lavonne Weaver (working alias Simoni King), and the couple married in 1940. The Best Man at his wedding was William "Stumpy" Zevon, who was later the father of the American rock singer-songwriter Warren Zevon.

In 1942, while serving a six-month sentence for bookmaking, Cohen beat up Nazi sympathizers Robert Noble and Ellis Jones, who were under indictment for sedition, after the former made anti-Semitic remarks against him.

In 1945 Cohen met Richard Nixon, who then was running for a seat in the House of Representatives. He contributed $5000 to his campaign. For his 1950 senate campaign Nixon, through Murray Chotiner, sought Cohen's help in raising campaign funds.

In 1947, the crime families allegedly ordered the murder of Siegel due to his mismanagement of the Flamingo Hotel Casino, most likely because Siegel or his girlfriend Virginia Hill was skimming money. According to one account, which does not appear in newspapers, Cohen reacted violently to Siegel's murder. Entering the Hotel Roosevelt, where he believed the killers were staying, Cohen fired rounds from his two .45 caliber semi-automatic handguns into the lobby ceiling and demanded that the assassins meet him outside in 10 minutes. However, no one appeared, and Cohen fled when the police arrived.

Cohen's violent methods came to the attention of state and federal authorities investigating Jack Dragna's operations. During this time, Cohen faced many attempts on his life, including the bombing of his home on posh Moreno Avenue in Brentwood. Cohen soon converted his house into a fortress, installing floodlights, alarm systems, and a well-equipped arsenal kept, as he often joked, next to his 200 tailor-made suits. Cohen briefly hired Johnny Stompanato as a bodyguard. However, in 1958, Stompanato was killed in self-defense by Cheryl Crane, the daughter of actress Lana Turner (whom he had been dating). Cohen covered the expense of Stompanato's funeral and then gave Turner's love letters to Stompanato to the press in an attempt to discredit the worst allegations of threats and violence that Crane had alleged she suffered at the hands of the violent, womanizing Stompanato.

=== Zionism ===
In 1947 Ben Hecht of the Zionist American League for a Free Palestine approached Cohen asking for his help to raise funds for the Jewish paramilitary group Irgun. Cohen agreed and a fundraiser was held at his Slapsy Maxie's Café in LA, reportedly raising $200,000 with an audience under threat from Cohen's men. He also sent men to stand guard outside of ALFP meetings in southern California. As a gangster, Cohen was impressed by the violence of the Irgun. Of his conversations with Hecht, he said, "This guy got me so goddamn excited. He started telling me how these guys actually fight like racket guys would. They didn't ask for a quarter and they gave no quarter. And I got pretty well enthused with them". He dispatched to Mandatory Palestine his friend "Chopsie" to teach the Zionists how to use explosives.

Due to his support of Israel and his turning a blind eye to arms smuggling to Palestine, Cohen had great respect for US President Harry Truman, stating "he was the greatest man in the world...because of what he done for Israel and because he made it available for us to do". For his aid to the Zionist cause, Cohen received a silver cigarette box from the Hebrew Committee for National Liberation, bearing the engraving "In Gratitude, to a Fellow Fighter for Hebrew Freedom". Journalist Herb Brin who knew Cohen recalls "I knew who he was and what he was, but when we talked about Israel, he was a different person. He had tears in his eyes once when we talked about Israel".

== Later years ==
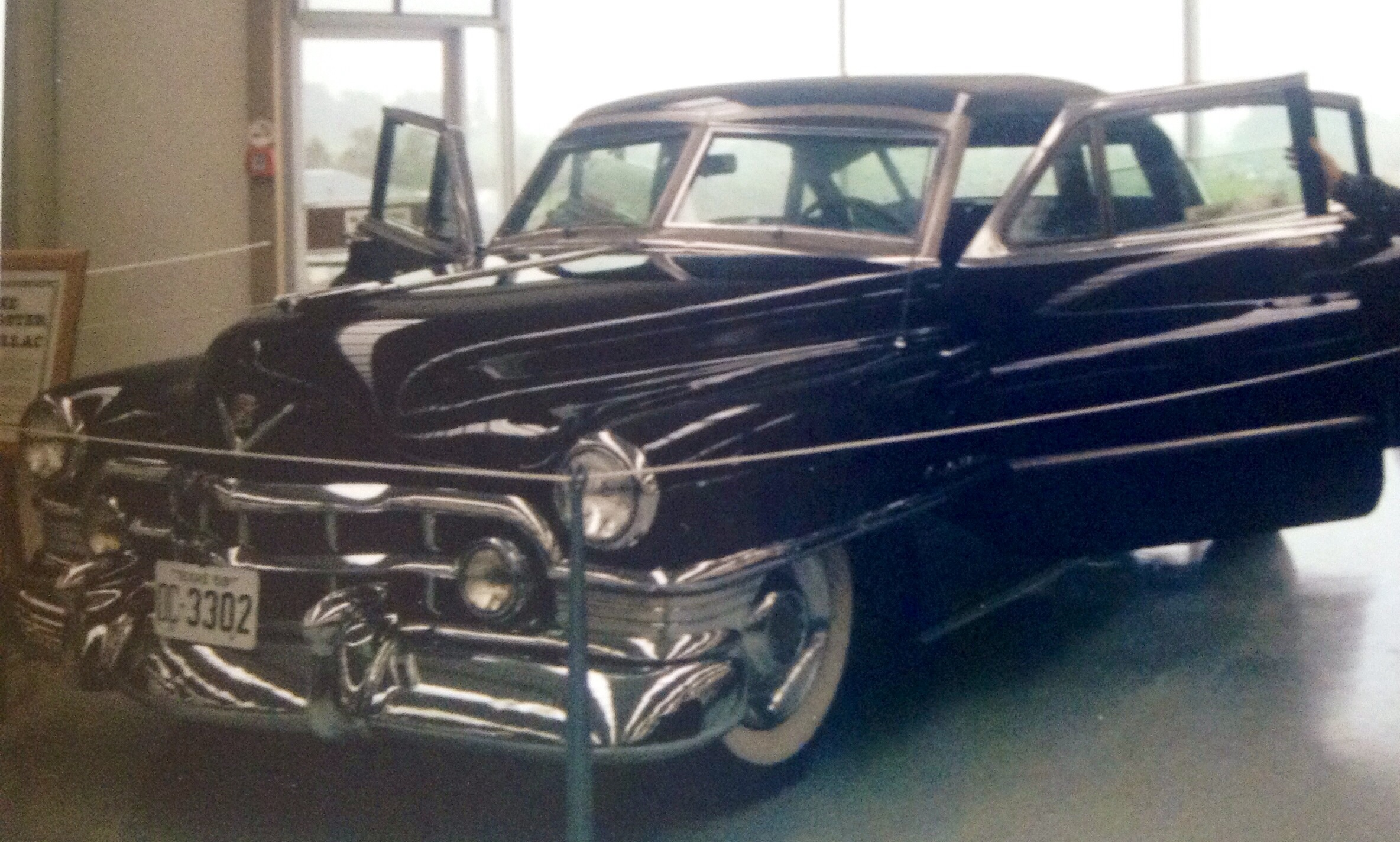
Cohen's armored 1950 Cadillac

In 1950, Cohen was investigated along with many other underworld figures by a U.S. Senate committee known as the Kefauver Commission. As a result of this investigation, Cohen was convicted of tax evasion in June 1951 and sentenced to four years in prison.

When he was released in October 1955, he became an international celebrity. He ran floral shops, paint stores, nightclubs, casinos, gas stations, a men's haberdashery, and even drove an ice cream van on San Vicente Boulevard in the Brentwood section of Los Angeles, according to author Richard Lamparski.

In 1957, TIME magazine wrote a brief article about Cohen's meeting with Christian evangelist Billy Graham. Cohen said: "I am very high on the Christian way of life. Billy came up, and before we had food he said—What do you call it, that thing they say before food? Grace? Yeah, grace. Then we talked a lot about Christianity and stuff." Allegedly when Cohen did not change his lifestyle, he was confronted by Christian acquaintances. His response: "Christian football players, Christian cowboys, Christian politicians; why not a Christian gangster?"

Cohen was friends with Melvin Belli, who also served as his lawyer. Belli referred to Cohen as a "gentleman of great courtliness and charm". He served as a babysitter for Belli's son Caesar, and at one point he was loaned $3000 by Belli. In 1958 Cohen was indicted for assaulting a federal officer, with Belli defending him. The result was a jury deadlock. In 1959 he represented Cohen's girlfriend, the stripper Candy Barr, after she was arrested on possession of marijuana. When Belli had a squabble with the American Bar Association (ABA), he decided to get them back by inviting Cohen, branded as Professor Julian O'Brien of Harvard, to deliver a seminar on tax law at the ABA's Miami convention at the same time as he was under indictment for tax evasion. Cohen's talk was unserious and concluded with "My parting advice to you guys is, 'Pay your taxes'".

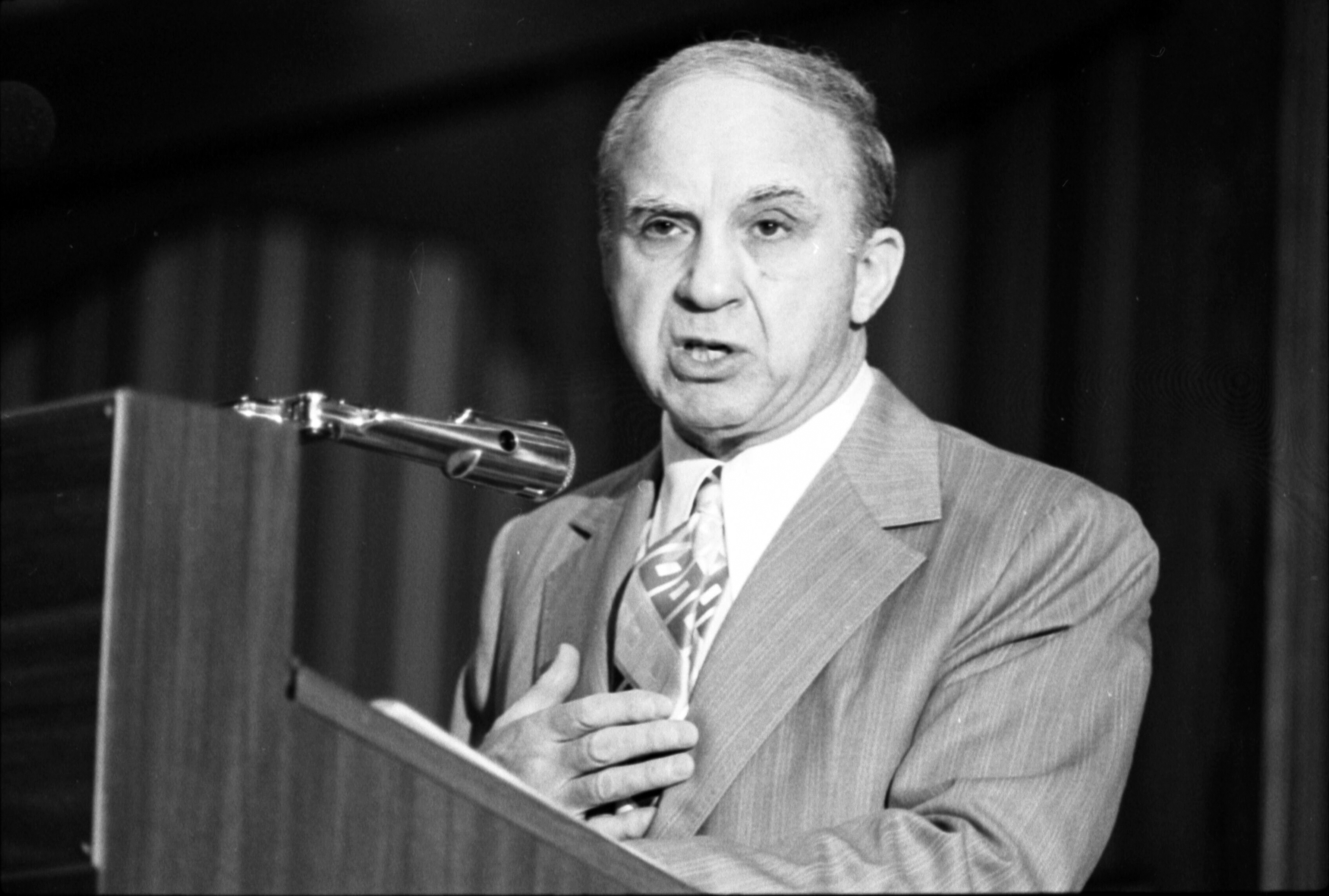
Cohen speaking at the Ex-Felon Consortium in 1975

In 1961, Cohen was again convicted of tax evasion and sent to Alcatraz. He was the only prisoner ever bailed out of Alcatraz; his bond was signed by U.S. Supreme Court Chief Justice Earl Warren. After his appeals failed, Cohen was sent to a federal prison in Atlanta, Georgia. His heavily armored Cadillac from this period was confiscated by the Los Angeles Police Department and is on display at the Southward Car Museum in New Zealand. On August 14, 1963, during his time at the Atlanta Federal Penitentiary, inmate Burl Estes McDonald attempted to kill Cohen with a lead pipe. In 1972, Cohen was released from the Atlanta Federal Penitentiary, where he had spoken out against prison abuse. He had been misdiagnosed with an ulcer, which turned out to be stomach cancer. After undergoing surgery, he continued touring the United States and made television appearances, once with Ramsey Clark.

=== Death ===
In July 1976, Cohen died at age 62 due to the complications from stomach cancer surgery. He was laid to rest at Hillside Memorial Park Cemetery in Culver City, California.

== In popular culture and media ==
=== Films ===
- In the film Bugsy (1991), Mickey Cohen is portrayed by actor Harvey Keitel. Keitel received an Oscar nomination for Best Supporting Actor.
- In the film L.A. Confidential (1997), based on James Ellroy's 1990 novel, Mickey Cohen is portrayed by actor Paul Guilfoyle.
- In the film Gangster Squad (2013), Cohen is portrayed by actor Sean Penn and is the main antagonist of the film, portrayed as a sadistic and cruel man who enjoys murder and intends to expand his criminal enterprises to other major cities in the United States. The film shows a fictionalized version of Cohen's downfall: Cohen is beaten in a fistfight and arrested by the LAPD for murdering one of his subordinates, when he was actually imprisoned for tax evasion. Also, he is sentenced to life imprisonment, when in real life, Cohen was eventually released from custody and died of stomach cancer.
- In the film The Lincoln Lawyer (2011), adapted from the book series by Michael Connelly, protagonist Michael Haller (Matthew McConaughey) is the son of a criminal defense lawyer who represented Cohen, and also owns a pistol gifted to his father by Cohen after a successful murder defense.

=== Games ===
- Patrick Fischler lends his voice and likeness to play Mickey Cohen in the 2011 video game L.A. Noire (set in 1947), who is involved in a few cases while working the Vice desk.

=== Literature ===
- In James Ellroy's L.A. Quartet book series, Cohen plays a major supporting role in three of the novels: The Big Nowhere (1988), L.A. Confidential (1990) and White Jazz (1992).
- In retired newspaperman Howard Scott Williams' 2017 memoir The Gangster's Butler, recounting stories he reported on from 1948 to 1976, he recounts posing as a butler for Cohen in order to get information for a story.

=== Television ===
- In Frank Darabont's television series Mob City, Cohen is portrayed by Jeremy Luke.
- In the 2022 miniseries The Offer, Cohen is portrayed by Louis Mandylor.
- Mentioned in Swat television series Season 3 episode 5 "The LBC"
- In season eight of Archer, Archer Dreamland, set in 1947 Los Angeles, mob boss Len Trexler is heavily inspired by Cohen.

== Additional sources ==
- Davies, Lloyd G., Los Angeles City Council member, 1943–51, questioned police wiretaps on Mickey Cohen
- Kelly, Robert J. Encyclopedia of Organized Crime in the United States. Westport, Connecticut: Greenwood Press, 2000. ISBN 0-313-30653-2
- Phillips, Charles and Alan Axelrod. Cops, Crooks, and Criminologists: An International Biographical Dictionary of Law Enforcement. Updated edition. New York: Checkmark Books, 2000. ISBN 0-8160-3016-2
- Sifakis, Carl. The Mafia Encyclopedia. New York: Facts on File, 2005. ISBN 0-8160-5694-3
- Sifakis, Carl. The Encyclopedia of American Crime. New York: Facts on File, 2001. ISBN 0-8160-4040-0

Business positions
| Preceded by Benjamin Siegel | Cohen crime family Boss; 1947-1961 | Succeeded by |
