= Poor Greg Drowning =

- Film poster
- Directed by: Jeffrey Scott Collins
- Written by: Jeffrey Scott Collins
- Based on: Glimpses of Greg
- Produced by: Jeffrey Scott Collins, Jessica Kraby, Andrea Topper
- Starring: Graham Sibley, Marguerite Insolia, Ajay Mehta
- Narrated by: Cedric the Entertainer
- Music by: Gary Lionelli; Nicole Churchill
- Distributed by: Comedy Dynamics
- Release dates: April 27, 2018 (Sunscreen Film Festival); August 11, 2020 (digital)
- Running time: 77 minutes
- Country: United States
- Language: English

Poor Greg Drowning is a 2018 comedy film from writer and director Jeffrey Scott Collins, adapted from his short film Glimpses of Greg. It stars Graham Sibley, Marguerite Insolia, and Ajay Mehta, and was narrated by Cedric the Entertainer. An initial cut of the film premiered at the 2018 Sunscreen Film Festival in St. Petersburg, Florida. Comedy Dynamics released the film via multiple digital platforms on August 11, 2020.

== Plot ==
A writer from New York named Greg Drowning falls in love with a new tenant renting a room in his Los Angeles home.

== Development ==
Poor Greg Drowning was adapted from director Jeffrey Scott Collins's short film Glimpses of Greg, and some footage from the short film was used in the feature. Collins mainly filmed Poor Greg Drowning on weekends. The animated sequences in the film were created by animator Steven Kamakanda, and were inspired by Collins' drawing of Greg as a stick figure used as a title card for Glimpses of Greg. The sequences were added after an early cut Poor Greg Drowning had played at festivals, with Cedric the Entertainer, who Collins worked with on Why Him?, agreeing to narrate the scenes. Some of the dialogue was improved by the actors on-set. The soundtrack was composed by Nicole Churchill, although Collins chose not to use music in several key dramatic moments throughout the film, as he felt it may distract from the comedy.

Filming began in June 2015 and ended in September 2016, and the film was shot with a small crew. After the early cut played at festivals, the final cut of the film was completed in March 2020. As the crew did not have a dedicated props department, they needed to mix together an assortment of foods in the kitchen at the location where they were filming to create the fake vomit for the scene where Greg vomits over his trainer’s feet. The final scenes in the film were filmed over a period of six days after the crew received additional funding to finish principal photography.

It was confirmed on April 27, 2020 that Comedy Dynamics had acquired Poor Greg Drowning and would release the film onto video on demand services on August 11.

== Reception ==
David Gelmini of Cultured Vultures awarded Poor Greg Drowning a score of 8 out of 10, praising the screenplay and the performances of the cast, and calling the film a “moving and powerful story about one man’s desperate attempt to find meaning and companionship in his life.” Markos Papadatos of Digital Journal awarded it 4.5 out of 5 stars, saying “The cast in this film is solid, and so is the directing.”

It won the People's Choice for Best Feature Film at the 2019 Borrego Springs Film Festival. Best Comedy Feature at the Queens World Film Festival, Best Director, Best Actor, and Best Actress awards at the Los Angeles Comedy Festival, and a Jury Prize at The Florida Comedy Film Festival.
