= The River of Time =

1986 science fiction anthology by David Brin

- Author: David Brin
- Original title: The River of Time
- Cover artist: Paul Sonju
- Language: English
- Genre: Science fiction
- Publication date: 1986
- Media type: Print
- ISBN: 0-913165-11-5

The River of Time (1986) is a collection of science fiction short stories by American writer David Brin.

== Contents ==
- "The Crystal Spheres" (first published in 1984) (Winner of the Hugo Award in 1985 in the Short Story category)
- "The Loom of Thessaly" (first published in 1981)
- "The Fourth Vocation of George Gustaf" (first published in 1984)
- "Senses Three and Six"
- "Toujours Voir"
- "A Stage of Memory"
- "Just a Hint" (first published in 1980)
- "Tank Farm Dynamo" (first published in 1983)
- "Thor Meets Captain America"
- "Lungfish"
- "The River of Time" (first published in 1981 as "Coexistence" in Isaac Asimov's Science Fiction Magazine)*

== Sources, references, external links, quotations ==
- The River of Time title listing at the Internet Speculative Fiction Database

== Reception ==
Dave Langford reviewed The River of Time for White Dwarf #94, and stated that "more conventional but contains some nice genre-mixing: in 'The Loom of Thessaly' the weaving Fates encounter spaceborne weaponry, and 'Thor Meets Captain America' offers a nasty world where Hitler did achieve his dreams of recruiting supernatural aid."

== Reviews ==
- Review by Dan Chow (1986) in Locus, #307 August 1986
- Review by Don D'Ammassa (1987) in Science Fiction Chronicle, #93 June 1987
- Review by Paul Kincaid (1987) in Paperback Inferno, #69
- Review by W. Paul Ganley (1987) in Fantasy Mongers Quarterly, #22 Spring 1987
