= Mob City =

- Genre: Crime drama; Neo-noir
- Created by: Frank Darabont
- Based on: L. A. Noir by John Buntin
- Written by: Frank Darabont; Michael Sloane; David J. Schow; David Leslie Johnson
- Directed by: Frank Darabont; Guy Ferland
- Starring: Jon Bernthal; Milo Ventimiglia; Neal McDonough; Alexa Davalos; Jeffrey DeMunn; Andrew Rothenberg; Robert Knepper; Gregory Itzin; Edward Burns
- Composer: Mark Isham
- Country of origin: United States
- Original language: English
- No. of seasons: 1
- No. of episodes: 6

Production
- Executive producers: Frank Darabont; Michael De Luca; Elliot Webb
- Producers: Wayne Carmona; Paul F. Bernard
- Production location: California
- Cinematography: David Tattersall; Rohn Schmidt
- Editors: Nathan D. Gunn; Hunter M. Via
- Running time: 43 minutes 46 minutes (pilot)
- Production companies: Darkwoods Productions; Swiftly Productions; Michael DeLuca Productions; TNT Original Production

Original release
- Network: TNT
- Release: December 4 – December 18, 2013

Mob City is an American neo-noir crime drama television series created by Frank Darabont for TNT. It is based on real-life accounts of the L.A.P.D. and gangsters in 1940s Los Angeles as chronicled in John Buntin's book L.A. Noir: The Struggle for the Soul of America's Most Seductive City. The series premiered on December 4, 2013.

On February 10, 2014, TNT canceled the series after one season. In Germany the series was released via polyband on DVD and Regional lockout-free Blu-ray on July 2, 2015, however there are no known plans to release the series on home video in the U.S.

== Synopsis ==
Mob City is based on a true story of a conflict that lasted decades between the Los Angeles Police Department (under leadership of police chief William Parker), and ruthless criminal elements led by Bugsy Siegel, who was in charge of the Los Angeles mafia operations. The series is a crime drama set in Los Angeles during 1947, with brief visits to the 1920s to show background information. The so-called noir period in L.A. was a time of flashy cars, newly minted movie stars and new beginnings; it was also a time of lies and corruption. Half of the LAPD was run by mafia families with money and there were huge loopholes in the system, which the mob exploited.

== Cast and characters ==
=== Main ===
- Jon Bernthal as LAPD Detective Joe Teague, a former US Marine Corps Master Gunnery Sergeant and Guadalcanal Campaign veteran caught in the conflict between Parker and Cohen
- Milo Ventimiglia as Ned Stax, a lawyer and fixer for Cohen, who also fought alongside Teague in the war
- Neal McDonough as William Parker, a captain in the LAPD bent on taking down the mob
- Alexa Davalos as Jasmine Fontaine, a beautiful woman working as a photographer at Cohen's nightclub
- Jeffrey DeMunn as Hal Morrison, the detective at the head of the LAPD's new mob squad
- Andrew Rothenberg as Eddy Sanderson, a member of Morrison's mob squad and a friend of Joe's
- Robert Knepper as Sid Rothman, a mobster working closely with Cohen and Siegel; based on Cohen's hitman Harold "Harry" Rothman
- Jeremy Luke as Mickey Cohen, the most dangerous mobster in Los Angeles
- Gregory Itzin as Fletcher Bowron, the mayor of Los Angeles
- Edward Burns as Bugsy Siegel, one of the most infamous mobsters in Los Angeles

=== Recurring ===
- Dana Gould as Tug Purcell, a member of Morrison's mob squad
- John Pollono as Pat Dolan, a member of Morrison's mob squad and Mike's partner
- Daniel Roebuck as Nick Bledsoe, a member of Morrison's mob squad and Tug's partner
- Richard Brake as Terry Mandel, Rothman's right hand man
- Iddo Goldberg as Leslie Shermer, a man involved in Hecky's blackmail
- Mike Hagerty as Fat Jack Bray, an older member of Morrison's mob squad
- Michael McGrady as Clemence B Horrall, the chief of the LAPD
- Gordon Clapp as Carl Steckler, a former employee of Cohen's
- Jeremy Strong as Mike Hendry, a member of Morrison's mob squad that butts heads with Joe
- Paul Ben-Victor as Jack Dragna, a mobster and rival of Cohen's
- Mekia Cox as Anya, the head bartender at one of Bunny's bars
- James Hebert as Miles Hewitt, a lieutenant in the LAPD
- Brendan Sexton III as Jerry Edelstein
- Amin Joseph as Skeety

=== Guest stars ===
- Simon Pegg as Hecky Nash, a comic with blackmail against the mob
- Ernie Hudson as Bunny, a mobster who owns nightclubs across Central Avenue
- Patrick Fischler as Meyer Lansky, a mobster and an associate of Siegel

== Production ==
=== Development ===
The project was first announced in January 2012, under the title L.A. Noir. When asked about details concerning the show, Darabont said various cultures, such as those of African-Americans and Hispanics, would likely be explored, and he was interested in expanding upon already touched upon aspects from Buntin's book. Darabont also commented on the general nature of his project, explaining he wanted to avoid its coming off as a docudrama while still staying true to the book, part of the way to doing that required inserting fictional characters into the timeline. The series was picked up for six episodes in October 2012.

In January 2013, the title was changed to Lost Angels, as the original title was considered too similar to that of the video game L.A. Noire. In August 2013, the title was changed again to Mob City.

=== Casting ===
Jon Bernthal was the first to be officially cast; after one month of negotiations he was officially cast as the lead. Following after him were Milo Ventimiglia, Jeremy Strong, Neal McDonough, and in a guest role Simon Pegg. Alexa Davalos was cast as the female lead after which two more cast members were announced, Jeffrey DeMunn and Andrew Rothenberg. Both of the latter previously worked with Bernthal and Darabont in The Walking Dead. Following the six episode order Pihla Viitala (who was later replaced by Mekia Cox) and Gregory Itzin were confirmed to star. Thomas Jane, who starred in Darabont's film The Mist, was in talks to join the show in the role of famous mobster Bugsy Siegel. Edward Burns was later cast in the role of Siegel, instead of Jane. Jeremy Luke was confirmed to be playing the legendary mobster Mickey Cohen in June 2013. Robert Knepper confirmed that he had been cast in a recurring role in the series, but at the time his role was unknown. Before filming of the rest of the series began Knepper was promoted to a series regular, as Sid Rothman, a mobster working for Cohen. Ernie Hudson was cast in a recurring role as a mobster nicknamed "Bunny", in June 2013.

=== Filming ===
According to guest star Simon Pegg, filming for the pilot began on May 10, 2012, and wrapped shortly after sunset on May 25, 2012. The rest of the series started filming in June 2013 and ended in late August of the same year. While the pilot was shot on 35mm film, the balance of the series was shot digitally. Darabont, a proponent of film who described himself as "one of the last holdouts", was sufficiently impressed with the approximation to film that digital had come to be able to accomplish.

Changes were made to the original pilot due to the lengthy timespan between production and the series proper as well as to better establish series regulars. A new prologue from prohibition era New York was conceived introducing the characters of Bugsy Siegel, Sid Rothman, and Meyer Lansky which becomes contextualized in the finale. The pilot originally began with a flashback introducing young Mickey Cohen and William Parker; this was moved to the second episode. A new scene at a church which introduced the character of Leslie Shermer and further expanded Sid Rothman's role was also incorporated into the premiere. Some characters from the pilot were also recast: Gregory Itzin replaced Ron Rifkin as the mayor of Los Angeles, and Mekia Cox replaced Pihla Viitala as Bunny's Jungle Club bartender Anya. A production still from the pilot featuring Viitala was used prominently in the show's online marketing despite her absence in the show.

== Episodes ==
No.	Title	Directed by	Written by	Original release date	U.S. viewers (millions)
1	"A Guy Walks Into a Bar"	Frank Darabont	Frank Darabont	December 4, 2013	2.29
In 1925, Bugsy Siegel, Meyer Lansky, and Sid Rothman kill a group of men and steal their booze-laden truck. In 1947, a man drops off a note in Police Detective Joe Teague's mailbox; Joe later discovers the note inside a matchbook and goes to a bar called "Bunny's Jungle" at 8 pm, as directed on the matchbook. While there, stand-up comic Hecky Nash gives Joe a bodyguard job in exchange for a grand to back him up on a blackmail deal. Joe is hesitant about it, and Nash leaves the bar awaiting his answer. Joe immediately pulls Nash's files and tells his superiors, Detective Hal Morrison and Captain William Parker, about the deal and how it could involve something big. Morrison sets up an undercover mob squad in the LAPD. Joe agrees to Nash's deal and meets with him later in the oil fields hills, in a more private area, while backup awaits down the hill. Sid Rothman meets with Nash, and they exchange some negatives for cash. Joe is hesitant to signal his fellow officers upon recognizing the pictures. Rothman leaves with his package, and Nash celebrates his victory at getting 50 grand in cash. However, he is quickly gunned down by Joe who then wipes the gun down, leaves it near Nash's body, and hides the money in his car. Morrison and the cops arrive, and Joe fabricates a story which points to Rothman as Nash's killer. Joe retreats to Bunny's Jungle, guilty of killing Nash. There, Ned Stax, a mob lawyer, sits next to him. Joe slides him the match book with the note on it, revealing that Ned was the one who had left it in his mailbox, and then gives him Nash's money. Ned offers the money back to Joe, claiming that his boss Bugsy Siegel wants him to have it, but Joe turns him down, not wanting to be an enforcer for the mob. The two part ways wishing each other Semper Fi, the U.S.Marine Corps motto, revealing they had fought in the war together.
2	"Reason to Kill a Man"	Frank Darabont	Frank Darabont	December 4, 2013	2.29
In 1922, a young Mickey Cohen attempts to rob a movie theater. The event inspires William Parker to join the LAPD. Back in 1947, Bugsy Siegel arrives at Mickey Cohen's cabaret, "The Clover Club", where he receives Hecky's negatives from Rothman and asks for them to be burnt. Ned then reports to Siegel that Joe has killed Nash, free of charge. This angers Seigel, as he does not want to be seen as a charity case. Morrison brings in Nash's girlfriend, Jasmine Fontaine, to interrogate her about her relations with Nash, Cohen, and Siegel. After being unable to get any information out of her, Captain Parker suspects she is hiding something and puts a 24-hour surveillance team on her. While keeping a close eye on Jasmine, Joe follows her to Union Station, where she hides multiple photographs and a box of camera equipment in a locker. Meanwhile, Rothman is tipped off by Carl, a former employee of Cohen's who is now a busboy, that two men he is looking for are currently eating at a restaurant he works at. Rothman disguises himself as a busboy and guns the two men down. Joe later meets Ned at Bunny's Jungle, where Ned informs Joe that Siegel is unhappy with Joe's refusal of payment. Joe does not seem to care and begins to gaze at a picture in his wallet. Ned tells him to burn the picture and move on. Joe burns the picture, which is of him and Jasmine on their wedding day, revealing a past relationship between the two.
3	"Red Light"	Frank Darabont	Michael Sloane	December 11, 2013	1.39
Three weeks prior to Hecky's death, it is shown that he witnessed Bugsy Siegel killing Abe Greenberg, an informant for the LAPD. Hecky has Jasmine take photographs of the incident, the ones he would later use for blackmail. Three weeks later, Captain Parker and his mob squad are investigating the murders Sid committed at the restaurant. The murder victims are revealed to be informants who knew that Siegel had killed Greenberg. The next day, the squad gathers up dozens of mob figures hoping to gather some information on the recent crimes. One of the mobsters let it slip that Hecky's blackmail was pictures, worrying Joe about Jasmine's safety. Suddenly, Ned Stax arrives with Sid, who has come to willingly be interrogated. Sid taunts Joe during the interrogation and is then sent to a police line up. An eye witness to the murders identifies the wrong man, forcing the police to let Sid go. Meanwhile, Jasmine meets a man named Leslie Shermer, who claims to have been in on Hecky's blackmail and threatens Jasmine to give him the money Hecky owes him for the deal. Joe visits Jasmine later that night to tell her she is no longer under surveillance and that he knows about the locker at Union Station; he takes the key for safekeeping. Suddenly, Mickey Cohen and Sid visit Jasmine to question her about anything she might know about who helped Hecky take the photographs. Joe hides outside on a fire escape, where he over hears Mickey and Sid talk about how Carl, the busboy from the previous night, is about to get murdered by their men. Joe quickly goes looking for Carl, whom he finds being chased by Cohen's men on a carousel. Joe guns down the men, saving Carl's life. Carl then confesses he knows who committed the restaurant murders, Sid Rothman.
4	"His Banana Majesty"	Guy Ferland	David J. Schow	December 11, 2013	1.39
Bugsy Siegel arrives back in Los Angeles after a trip to Las Vegas. He is immediately arrested by Captain Parker for the murder of Abe Greenberg. This backfires on Parker, who lacks sufficient evidence against Siegel and only has 26 hours to find any. Word spreads about Siegel's arrest, and other mobsters who work for Jack Dragna try to take over Siegel's business while he is in prison. Jasmine receives a threatening message from Leslie, who is still demanding money from the blackmail. She seeks help from Ned, who gives her enough money to pay Leslie off. The two begin to discuss Joe and how he has changed since the war. Meanwhile, mob squad members Eddy Sanderson, Pat Dollan, and Tug Purcell plant a bug in Cohen's office. Eddy hears what Jasmine says about Joe but keeps it to himself. Jasmine tries to give Leslie the money, but he has now learned the deal was for a larger sum of money than he had thought and wants the whole 50 grand. Not having the money, Jasmine offers Leslie the pictures she has hidden at Union Station, which Leslie gives her 24 hours to get. Ned is called upon by a mobster named "Bunny", the owner of "Bunny's Jungle", who fears that a recent death during the mob takeovers during Siegel's incarceration could start a potential war. Mickey Cohen retaliates against the recent mob attacks by ransacking one of the mobster's warehouses, which is used for banana distribution. Later that night, Joe arrives home where he is met by Sid Rothman, who knocks him unconscious.
5	"Oxpecker"	Guy Ferland	David Leslie Johnson	December 18, 2013	1.35
In 1944, Joe wakes up from a nightmare and begins to strangle Jasmine, thinking he is still at war, but snaps out of it and breaks down crying over hurting his wife. Back in 1947, Rothman has Joe handcuffed in his apartment and wants to know where Carl is. Joe refuses to tell him, but Rothman finds out about Joe and Jasmine's past marriage after looking through a photo album and threatens her safety. A phone call comes through to Joe's apartment from Terry Mandel, Rothman's right-hand man. Terry and another mobster have disguised themselves as police officers and have entered the safe house where Carl is being held, having discovered its location from an unknown source. The two kill Carl and mob squad member Jack Bray; they also mortally wound Tug. With Carl dead and no evidence against Siegel or himself, Rothman lets Joe go free. Joe visits Jasmine, who cleans up his wound, and they spend the night together. Cohen and Jack Dragna meet with Bunny, who has them reluctantly agree to a truce. Tug awakens in a hospital and is unable to identify the men who killed Carl or Jack, leaving Parker and the squad with zero evidence, thus forcing them to release Siegel. Leslie shows up at Jasmine's apartment, demanding that they go to the locker immediately. The two stop at The Clover Club on the way, with Leslie thinking Jasmine is going to set up a meeting between them and Siegel for when they have the pictures. Jasmine tells Rothman and Cohen that she took the pictures and still has copies. She agrees to give them the copies if they handle Leslie when they arrive at Union Station. Meanwhile, mob squad member Mike Hendry interrogates Joe, suspecting him of being involved with the mob and being the one who tipped them off about the safe house. Joe then gets a phone call from Eddy, who has heard the whole conversation between Cohen and Jasmine through the bug in his office. At Union Station, Leslie and Jasmine open the locker, but nothing is inside. Rothman shows up, and Leslie threatens to set off a grenade if they come near him.
6	"Stay Down"	Frank Darabont	Frank Darabont & David Leslie Johnson	December 18, 2013	1.35
Joe turns up at Union Station, manages to subdue Leslie, and hands him over to Rothman. Rothman then asks for the pictures, which Joe had taken from the locker. Joe demands Jasmine's safety before handing over the pictures. Rothman tells Joe he will set up a meeting between him and Bugsy Siegel. After leaving Union Station, Joe tells Jasmine that it was he who killed Hecky, and he tells her to leave on the next train out of town and never come back, which she does. Joe then meets with Eddy, who gives him the recordings from Cohen's office, seeing that Joe really cares about Jasmine. Parker hires Tug to be the head of a new Internal Affairs Division, hoping to find out who gave away the safe house location and take down Chief Horrall, whom he believes to be corrupt. Before meeting with Joe, Siegel meets with his old associate Meyer Lansky, who informs him that he will no longer receive funding for the building of casinos in Las Vegas. Siegel then meets with Joe, whom he has beaten, and takes the pictures, telling Joe he plans to have Jasmine killed. Later that night, Joe sneaks into Siegel's estate and guns him down from outside his house, killing him. Joe later meets with Ned, who is the only one who has figured out he was Siegel's killer. Ned tells Joe he has only made the mob problem in Los Angeles even worse. Rothman burns all the remaining copies of the blackmail pictures. Cohen, who is now the head of the mob in Los Angeles, meets with Lansky, who wants him to find out who was behind Siegel's murder.

== Reception ==
=== Critical response ===
Mob City received generally positive reviews from critics. On Rotten Tomatoes, the series has a rating of 66% based on 47 reviews, with an average rating of 6.43/10. The website's critical consensus reads: "Frank Darabont's love letter to classic noir, Mob City sometimes feels a bit too familiar, but it's stunning to look at." On Metacritic, the series has a weighted average score of 63 out of 100, based on 34 critics, indicating "generally favorable reviews".

=== Accolades ===
Year	Award	Category	Nominee(s)	Result
2014	Satellite Award	Best Miniseries or Television Film		Nominated
2014	ADG Excellence in Production Design Award	Best Production Design – Television Movie or Miniseries	Gregory Melton	Nominated
2014	Golden Reel Award	Best Sound Editing: Long Form Dialogue & ADR in Television	Lou Thomas	Nominated
2014	Visual Effects Society Award	Outstanding Supporting Visual Effects in a Broadcast Program	Jason Sperling, Michael Morreale, Valeri Pfahning, and Michael Enriquez	Nominated

== Legacy ==
Though the show did not find commercial success, TNT chief Michael Wright defended the decision to greenlight the series in a 2014 interview, commenting that "Mob City was a chance. It didn't draw the audience, but I'd do it again tomorrow."

In 2015, TNT premiered another serialized, period crime drama, Public Morals, which was developed by Mob City recurring actor Edward Burns. Burns was partially inspired by the positive relationship that Darabont had with TNT on Mob City to do the project with the network. The series shares other actors with Mob City, including Neal McDonough and Robert Knepper.

== See also ==
- Gangster Squad (LAPD)—a real-life unit of the LAPD
