= Herb Brin =

American journalist (1915 – 2003)

Herb Brin (February 17, 1915 – February 6, 2003) was an editor and journalist for largely Jewish publications in Chicago and California.

== Journalism and publishing career ==
Brin started his news career at his hometown paper, the City News Bureau of Chicago. Brin reported in Chicago on crime, including on the local gangs. He said he was familiar with the local Jewish gangsters, of whom he said: "They were uneducated. Crime was the easiest way to make a buck. That's all it was." He also reported on the local Nazi party from 1938 to 1939. He said: "I joined the Nazi party at the Hausfaterland, on western Avenue across from Riverview Park.... It was a hotbed of Nazi activity". Brin reported their actions to the Anti-defamation League. Separately, and without the League's knowledge, Brin reported the Nazi movements to local Jewish mobsters. Of this Brin said: "I marched with the Nazis, but I came back later with Jewish gangs and we beat them up good". This strain of Brin's reportage continued late into the newsman's career: he later wrote investigative pieces on American Nazi Party leader George Lincoln Rockwell and Holocaust denier Willis Carto. In his 70s, Brin demanded a tour of the Aryan Nations compound in Hayden Lake, Idaho, making clear that he was a Jewish journalist. He got the tour.

After his service in World War II during which he wrote for Yank magazine, Brin started writing public interest stories for the Los Angeles Times in 1947. He worked as top feature writer there, for instance writing on Charlie Chaplin's departure to Europe. Brin started his own publication Heritage in 1954, mortgaging his home to start the publication as a 12-page weekly. Though he quit his role at the LA Times at the start of this endeavor, he would continue writing there regularly, for instance covering the Eichmann trial in Jerusalem for them.

Brin edited and published the Heritage Jewish weeklies across California. As of 1976, Brin edited four publications owned by his Heritage Press:

- Heritage-Southwest Jewish Press (Los Angeles, weekly, circulation 10800; circulation 13500 in 1988)
- Heritage-Southwest Jewish Press, which had started publishing in 1914, taken over by Brin in 1958 (San Diego, weekly, circulation 4600)
- Orange County Jewish Heritage(Orange County, monthly, circulation 2300)
- Central Valley Jewish Heritage (Fresno, monthly, circulation 1500)

In 1979 Brin passed editorship and management of the papers to his son, David Brin. At time of death, only Brin's San Diego Heritage branch remained.

=== Suit against the Jewish Federation Council of Greater Los Angeles ===
Brin sued the local Jewish Federation Council of Greater Los Angeles for subsidizing the Jewish Journal, which Brin argued undermined independent papers including his own. This was one of Brin's longest-waged campaigns, and one in which he ultimately did not succeed. Brin protested outside foundation offices and conducted a $1.4 million suit, but ultimately closed most of his papers.

The Jewish Federation Council of Greater Los Angeles settled with Brin for an undisclosed-but-large sum after an eight-year suit. Brin had sued the council for financially supporting a competing publication, which Brin described as unfair competition, breach of contract, and restraint of trade. Several other independent Jewish publishers who were in competition with Federation publications supported Brin's suit. Fissures between independent and Federation-backed members of the American Jewish Press Association developed as a result of this suit, though the organization ultimately did not split apart. Following the successful suit, the Los Angeles federation was required to issue a statement in support of the free, independent press in addition to their monetary settlement. However, Brin continued to compete with the Jewish Journal, a publication which though nominally separate from the Federation, was in reality still a house organ. Other publishers of independent Jewish publications expressed concern about the continuing competition from tax-exempt Federation papers.

== Personal life ==
Brin was born in Chicago. He attended Crane Junior College, DePaul University and the University of Chicago.

Brin enlisted in the army after Pearl Harbor. After breaking both feet in a training accident, Brin wrote for the military's Yank magazine.

Outside of his journalistic career, Brin published six books of poetry, two books on the post-Holocaust Germany, and an autobiography completed shortly before his death.

In 1958, Brin refused to remain at an Israel Bonds dinner at which the German ambassador was invited. Brin asked of Israel's ambassador to the event, Abba Eban, "whether history has passed to such an extent that only 17 years after Warsaw Ghetto, Jews are ready to break bread with them".

Brin's father was Sol Brin, a writer and Polish immigrant. By 1954, Brin had three sons, including science-fiction author David Brin. Brin died on February 6, 2003, of congenital heart failure in a nursing home in Los Angeles at age 87. He was buried in Israel. He divorced three times and was survived by his three sons and six grandchildren. At time of death, his son David lived in San Diego, Daniel in West Hills, and Stan, a business writer, in Orange County.

Brin's long-time friends included Joseph Roos.

Brin attended the Minyan of Adat Shalom at West Los Angeles for part of his life. He was religious, but not always involved regularly in the organized community.

== Sources ==
- Rockaway, Robert A. (2000). But he was good to his mother : the lives and crimes of Jewish gangsters (Rev. ed.). Jerusalem: Gefen Pub. House. ISBN 9789652292490.
