= Gangster Squad (film) =

2013 film by Ruben Fleischer

- Theatrical release poster
- Directed by: Ruben Fleischer
- Written by: Will Beall
- Based on: Gangster Squad: Covert Cops, the Mob, and the Battle for Los Angeles by Paul Lieberman
- Produced by: Dan Lin; Kevin McCormick; Michael Tadross
- Starring: Josh Brolin; Ryan Gosling; Nick Nolte; Emma Stone; Anthony Mackie; Giovanni Ribisi; Michael Peña; Sean Penn
- Cinematography: Dion Beebe
- Edited by: Alan Baumgarten; James Herbert
- Music by: Steve Jablonsky
- Production companies: Village Roadshow Pictures; Lin Pictures; Kevin McCormick Productions
- Distributed by: Warner Bros. Pictures
- Release dates: January 7, 2013 (Grauman's Chinese Theatre); January 11, 2013 (United States)
- Running time: 113 minutes
- Country: United States
- Language: English
- Budget: $60–75 million
- Box office: $105.2 million

Gangster Squad is a 2013 American crime action thriller film directed by Ruben Fleischer and written by Will Beall, loosely based on a non-fiction book by Paul Lieberman. The film stars Josh Brolin, Ryan Gosling, Nick Nolte, Emma Stone, Anthony Mackie, Giovanni Ribisi, Robert Patrick, Michael Peña, and Sean Penn. Set in 1949, the film follows a group of real-life LAPD officers and detectives, the Gangster Squad, who are assigned to bring down crime kingpin Mickey Cohen.

After the script spent several years on the Black List, production began in September 2011 around Los Angeles, lasting through December. Originally scheduled to be released in theaters on September 7, 2012, the Aurora movie theater shooting prompted the production team to perform re-shoots to overwrite the old sequence from which the gangsters open fire at the Grauman's Chinese Theatre, before it was eventually released to theaters by Warner Bros. Pictures on January 11, 2013.

Gangster Squad received mixed reviews from critics and grossed $105 million worldwide.

== Plot ==
In 1949, Los Angeles, crime boss Mickey Cohen has become the most powerful figure in the underworld in California and intends to expand his criminal enterprise to encompass the entire West Coast. The LAPD has not been able to stop his ruthless rise, as he has eliminated witnesses, hired dirty cops to protect his activities, and avoided prosecution through spreading corruption in the justice system. For starters, World War II OSS veteran Sergeant John O'Mara brings down Cohen's prostitution building and arrests the perps, only for them to be released early into Cohen's care, until Cohen has them killed in a fire. Determined to put an end to Cohen and his dirty business empire, LAPD Chief Bill Parker creates a covert undercover unit, tasked with dismantling Cohen's dirty enterprise, and puts O'Mara in charge of the Squad. The unit is composed of officers who do not carry badges and are authorized to act outside of the law. With the help of his pregnant wife Connie, O'Mara recruits fellow war veteran Detective Jerry Wooters and four incorruptible misfit officers: knife-wielding Lieutenant Coleman Harris, wiretapping expert and family man Conwell Keeler, outlaw sharpshooter Max Kennard, and Kennard's rookie protégé Navidad Ramírez.

Despite initial setbacks, such as a casino raid thwarted by corrupt Burbank cops, the Squad strikes several successful blows at the heart of Cohen's operations, including shutting down his lucrative wire gambling business. They break into Cohen's mansion, and Keeler plants a bug in the back of a television. As a result, Cohen believes someone has betrayed him and lashes out at those inside his dirty business empire, including his etiquette tutor, Grace Faraday. Wooters and Faraday have entered into a secret romantic relationship, and he tries to help her escape from Cohen, enlisting the help of mutual friend and gangster Jack Whalen. Realizing the attackers have never stolen his money and only torched it, Cohen deduces they were cops and realizes that they have bugged his house. Cohen gives false information to lure the Squad into an unsuccessful ambush in Chinatown while Keeler is garroted by a hitman. O'Mara's home is hit in a drive-by in which Connie survives, but results in her giving birth to her and John's newborn son. When Faraday witnesses Cohen murder Whalen, she offers to testify against him. O'Mara forces the crooked Judge Carter to sign an arrest warrant before leading the Squad to the Park Plaza Hotel to arrest Mickey Cohen.

Cohen and his men engage in a lengthy shootout with the Squad, during which Wooters and Kennard are wounded. Cohen and his bodyguard, Karl Lennox, escape, but O'Mara rams their vehicle into a fountain. Navidad helps a dying Kennard shoot Lennox, saving O'Mara. Cohen and O'Mara engage in a brutal bare-knuckle brawl while onlookers and reporters gather. O'Mara finally defeats Cohen and has him arrested, ending his dirty business empire reigning over LA. The film explains that the Gangster Squad has never been mentioned for its role in keeping the underworld from gaining a foothold in LA, and that its surviving members remain extremely secret 'till this day. Mickey Cohen is sentenced to life imprisonment at Alcatraz, where he is greeted with a lead-pipe beating by inmates who were friends of Whalen. Harris and Ramírez partner together to walk the beat, Wooters and Faraday continue their relationship, and O'Mara quits his job with the LAPD to live a peaceful and quiet life with his wife and child.

== Cast ==
- Josh Brolin as Sergeant John O'Mara, a World War II veteran-turned-cop with a reputation as an honest, hardworking, no-nonsense man. He is a decorated war hero with the Silver Star and two Purple Hearts. He is believed to have been a part of the OSS trained at Camp X, but his Army record is partially classified.
- Ryan Gosling as Sergeant Jerry Wooters, an easygoing playboy and cop who initially struggles with the responsibility of fighting Cohen's organization but changes his mind when he sees how ruthless Cohen can be. He, too, is a World War II veteran, having served in the Pacific with the United States Army Air Force.
- Sean Penn as Mickey Cohen, the most powerful mobster in Los Angeles and an ex-boxer with a reputation for sadism and ruthlessness, whose ultimate goal is to expand his criminal empire to major cities back East.
- Nick Nolte as Chief Bill Parker, who forms the Squad to take down Cohen
- Emma Stone as Grace Faraday, Cohen's social etiquette teacher and quasi-lover who falls in love with Wooters
- Anthony Mackie as Lieutenant Coleman Harris, recruited into the Squad for his expertise in knife and gun fighting.
- Giovanni Ribisi as Officer Conwell Keeler, an electronics expert who joins the Squad to help them plant wiretaps
- Michael Peña as Officer Navidad Ramirez, Kennard's protégé
- Robert Patrick as Officer Max Kennard, a member of the Squad renowned for his sharpshooting skills
- Mireille Enos as Connie O'Mara, John's loyal wife
- Troy Garity as Wrevock, Cohen's top enforcer
- Holt McCallany as Karl Lennox, Cohen's bodyguard
- Sullivan Stapleton as Jack Whalen, a gangster and Cohen associate who is friends with Wooters
- James Carpinello as Johnny Stompanato, Cohen's right-hand man
- James Landry Hébert as Mitch Racine
- Evan Jones as Neddy Herbert
- Josh Pence as Officer Daryl Gates, a rookie member and future chief of the LAPD
- John Aylward as Judge Carter, a judge on Cohen's payroll
- Jack Conley as Sheriff Eugene W. Biscailuz, the sheriff of Los Angeles County, tasked with protecting Cohen's gambling operation
- Jack McGee as Lieutenant Quincannon
- Jon Polito as Jack Dragna, a rival mob boss to Cohen
- Wade Williams as Rourke
- Ambyr Childers as Milk-Skinned Blonde
- Mick Betancourt as Detective Sergeant Will Hendricks
- Mac Brandt as Bruiser
- Brandon Molale as Jimmy "Bockscar" Knox
- Michael Papajohn as Mike "The Flea"
- Jeff Wolfe as Giovanni Vacarezza
- Anthony Molinari as Lorenzo Molinari
- Austin Highsmith as Patty
- Neil Koppel as Max Solomon
- Austin Abrams as Pete
- Lucy Davenport as The Entertainer at Cohen's nightclub Slapsy Maxie's
- Dennis Cockrum as Chief Elmer Jackson, the Burbank Police Chief on Cohen's payroll
- Haley Strode as Maria Keeler, Keeler's wife
- Maxwell Perry Cotton as Charlie Keeler, Keeler's son
- Frank Grillo as Tommy Russo, a criminal executed on Cohen's orders
- Lucy Walsh as Manicurist

== Production ==
=== Filming ===
Principal photography began on September 6, 2011, in Los Angeles. Sets were located all over Los Angeles County, from north of the San Fernando Valley to south of the county border. Sets were also recreated in Sony Pictures Studios in Culver City. Filming wrapped on December 15, 2011.

=== Theater shooting and reshoots ===
The first trailer for Gangster Squad was released on May 9, 2012. In the wake of the theater shooting in Aurora, Colorado, on July 20, it was pulled from running before films and airing on television, and removed from Apple's trailer site and YouTube due to a scene where characters fire submachine guns at movie-goers through the screen of Grauman's Chinese Theatre.

It was later reported that the theater scene from the film would be either removed or placed in a different setting, since it is a crucial part of the film, and the film would undergo additional re-shoots of several scenes to accommodate these changes, which resulted in the film's release being moved to a later date. About a week after the Aurora shootings, Warner Bros. officially confirmed that the film would be released on January 11, 2013, after its original planned release for September 2012. Two weeks later, on August 22, the cast reunited in Los Angeles to completely re-shoot the film's main action sequence. The new sequence was set in a version of Chinatown, where the gangsters strike back at the Squad. Josh Brolin said he was not sad the original scene was cut and admitted that the new version would be just as violent as the original. Since the original cinematographer was no longer available, the new sequence was shot by Caleb Deschanel.

== Release and reception ==
=== Box office ===
Gangster Squad grossed $46 million in the United States and Canada, and $59.2 million in other territories, for a worldwide total of $105.2 million, against a production budget of $60 million.

The film grossed $17.1 million in its opening weekend, finishing third at the box office behind Zero Dark Thirty and A Haunted House. It then made $8.6 million in its second weekend (including $10.1 million over the four-day MLK weekend) and $4.3 million in its third weekend.

=== Home media ===
Gangster Squad was released on DVD and Blu-ray on April 23, 2013, by Warner Home Video. The Blu-ray includes director's commentary from Ruben Fleischer and several segments about the real life men and stories of the Gangster Squad and Mickey Cohen. As of June 2013, it had made $9.6 million from DVD sales and $6.7 million from Blu-ray, for a total of $16.3 million in sales.

=== Critical response ===
On review aggregator Rotten Tomatoes, the film holds an approval rating of 30% based on 204 reviews, with an average rating of 5/10. The website's critical consensus reads, "Though it's stylish and features a talented cast, Gangster Squad suffers from lackluster writing, underdeveloped characters, and an excessive amount of violence." On Metacritic, it has a weighted average score of 40 out of 100, based on 38 critics, indicating "mixed or average" reviews. Audiences polled by CinemaScore gave it an average grade of "B+" on an A+ to F scale.

Reviewers at Spill.com gave it a "Rental," praising its stylish design but criticizing the dialogue, Emma Stone's underdeveloped "damsel-in-distress" character, and Sean Penn's laughable makeup. IGN editor Chris Tilly wrote, "Gangster Squad looks great but frustrates because with the talent involved, it had the potential to be so much more", and rated it 6.3/10. Richard Roeper gave it a B+, saying "Gangster Squad is a highly stylized, pulp-fiction period piece based on true events" and noted its strong performances.

Filling in for Roger Ebert of the Chicago Sun-Times, Jeff Shannon gave the film 2 stars out of 4, saying that Fleischer, better known for his comedic work, was "out of his element, and barely suppressing his urge to spoof the genre". He further criticized the stock characters and the film's generally uneven tone, but praised action highlights such as the car chase and flashes of brilliance in Sean Penn's performance.

== Historical accuracy ==
Although the film is inspired by the real-life LAPD Gangster Squad, much of it is fabricated.

- The film portrays Cohen organizing the murder of his predecessor Jack Dragna. In reality, Cohen largely sidelined Dragna as head of the Los Angeles crime family but otherwise left him alone; Dragna died of a heart attack in 1956.
- The film shows Cohen's primary business as gambling, with prostitution and drug dealing as sidelines. In reality, Cohen's main racket was bookmaking; he detested drugs.
- William Parker was only 45 in 1949, not in his 70s like Nick Nolte (Parker died at age 61 in 1966). He also did not create the Gangster Squad; it was created by Chief Clemence B. Horrall in 1946, and was largely an effort to improve the city's image, regardless of whether it actually pursued criminals.
- The film concludes with Cohen being arrested in 1949 for murder and sent to Alcatraz. In reality, he was imprisoned in 1951 and again in 1961 for tax evasion. He was, however, attacked with a lead pipe while in prison, as depicted in the film.
- While Anthony Mackie and Michael Peña are members of the film's Squad, the real Squad was entirely Caucasian.
- While it is possible that Cohen murdered Jack Whalen in real life, it was not at Whalen's home as depicted in the film. Whalen was shot in 1959 while at dinner with Cohen and three of his associates, and Cohen was not officially accused of it.
- Cohen's bodyguard Johnny Stompanato was not shot as depicted in the film, but lived until 1958, when he was stabbed by Cheryl Crane, the daughter of his girlfriend Lana Turner.
- The character of Max Kennard was based on real-life lawman Doug "Jumbo" Kennard, who died after crashing his car as he drove under the influence of alcohol. He had already retired and was not shot in the line of duty as in the film.
- In the film, Conwell Keeler is the first member of the Squad to be killed. In real life, he outlived all of the Squad's other members, dying of a stroke in 2012.
