= Kiln People =

2002 novel by David Brin

- Cover of first edition (hardcover)
- Author: David Brin
- Language: English
- Genre: Science fiction
- Publisher: Tor Books
- Publication date: 2002
- Publication place: United States
- Media type: Print (Hardcover & Paperback)
- Pages: 460
- ISBN: 0-7653-0355-8
- OCLC: 48449616
- Dewey Decimal: 813/.54 21
- LC Class: PS3552.R4825 K55 2002

Kiln People is a 2002 science fiction novel by American writer David Brin. It was published in the United Kingdom under the title Kil'n People. It was short-listed in four different awards for best SF/fantasy novel of 2002 – the Hugo Award, the Locus Award, the John W. Campbell Award, and the Arthur C. Clarke Award – each time finishing behind a different book.

== Plot introduction ==
The novel takes place in a future in which people can create clay duplicates (called "dittos" or golems) of themselves. A ditto retains all of the archetype's memories up until the time of duplication. The duplicate lasts only about a day, and the original person (referred to in the book as an archie, from "archetype", or "rig", from "original") can then choose whether or not to upload the ditto's memories. Most dittos want to inload, so that their experience will be continuous with that of their archie. Most people use dittos to do their work, as they are affordable even for the poor. Many also use dittos to experience pleasure which could hurt a real person. Dittos come in many colors, which signify their quality and intended role. A cheap ditto suitable for housework is green, whereas a quality one for business is gray. Ebonies are highly specialized dittos that are good at intelligent data analysis; platinums are only used by the very rich, and closely resemble real people. Ivory dittos specialize in the reception of pleasure and sexual fulfillment. Other colors of ditto (such as purple, red, and yellow) exist, but are rarely mentioned in the novel.

== Plot summary ==
Albert Morris is a private detective who uses dittos extensively. His dittos are usually imprinted faithfully; indeed, his dittos have a fidelity rate rarely seen in the novel's world. The book opens with a green ditto being chased across the city by ditto thugs of Beta, a criminal figure engaged in copyright violation by kidnapping desirable dittos and duplicating them. Albert's green makes it to safety, allowing Albert to inload his memories and bust Beta's latest scheme. The next morning, Albert makes three dittos (two grays and a green) and sends them off to do his business. After four hours of sleep, he imprints an ebony to help him work on a case.

One gray meets with Ritu Maharal, the daughter of Yosil Maharal, one of the founders of Universal Kilns (UK) who has disappeared under suspicious circumstances. Yosil is later discovered dead, and Albert's gray meets the surviving Maharal ditto (or ghost, a ditto that survives after the original has died). ditMaharal runs away, and when the gray follows, he is captured by the ditto.

The second gray gets involved in a plan to infiltrate Universal Kilns to see if they are illegally withholding technical advancements to the duplicating process. He is a dupe of unknown forces, and is actually carrying a bomb into the UK factory, but he realizes just in time and manages to minimize the damage done when he blows up.

The green comes out of the kiln and starts doing the chores he was made to do, but soon displays a lack of motivation to complete his assigned tasks and instead heads off to the beach. Once there, he decides that he is an imperfect copy of Albert, or a "frankie" (a fictional slang word derived from Frankenstein's monster). This is an unprecedented occurrence for Albert due to his unusual ditto-making prowess. The green decides not to continue doing chores, and claims independence. Though an imperfect copy of Albert, the green figures prominently in the plot.

Meanwhile, real Albert disguises himself as a gray ditto and meets with Ritu, who is also disguised as a gray. On the way to investigate Yosil's cabin, where the eccentric scientist spent much of his time, they both are made aware of an attack on Albert's home. Shortly after, Albert and Ritu end up stranded in the desert after an attempt on their lives. They eventually make it to ditMaharal's secret lab where the first gray is being held. The green frankie makes it there as well, soon to expire.

ditMaharal has constructed an apparatus that he plans to use to elevate himself to godhood, using two of Albert's dittos to amplify himself and the deaths of over a million people to fuel his elevation. The green and the real Albert join forces to destroy the apparatus and disable the bioweapons that would have been used in an attack on a nearby city. However, the real Albert's mind winds up elevating, leaving his body in a comatose-like state. As the book ends, Albert and the green frankie agree to upload the green's memories into Albert's body, effectively replacing Albert's personality and memories with the frankie's: Albert will attempt to ascend to the higher plane of existence, and the frankie gets to lead the life he wanted, in Albert's body, with Clara (Albert's girlfriend).

== Translations ==
- German: "Copy" 2005
- Russian: "Глина" ("Clay"), 2005
- Spanish: "Gente de Barro" ("Mud People"), 2003
- Hebrew: "אנשי הכבשן" ("Kiln People"), 2004
- Bulgarian: "Килн хора" ("Kiln People"), 2006
- French: "Le Peuple d'argile" ("The Clay People")
- Japanese: "キルン・ピープル" ("Kiln People"), 2007
- Hungarian: "Dettó" 2009
