= David Brin =

American scientist and science fiction author (born 1950)

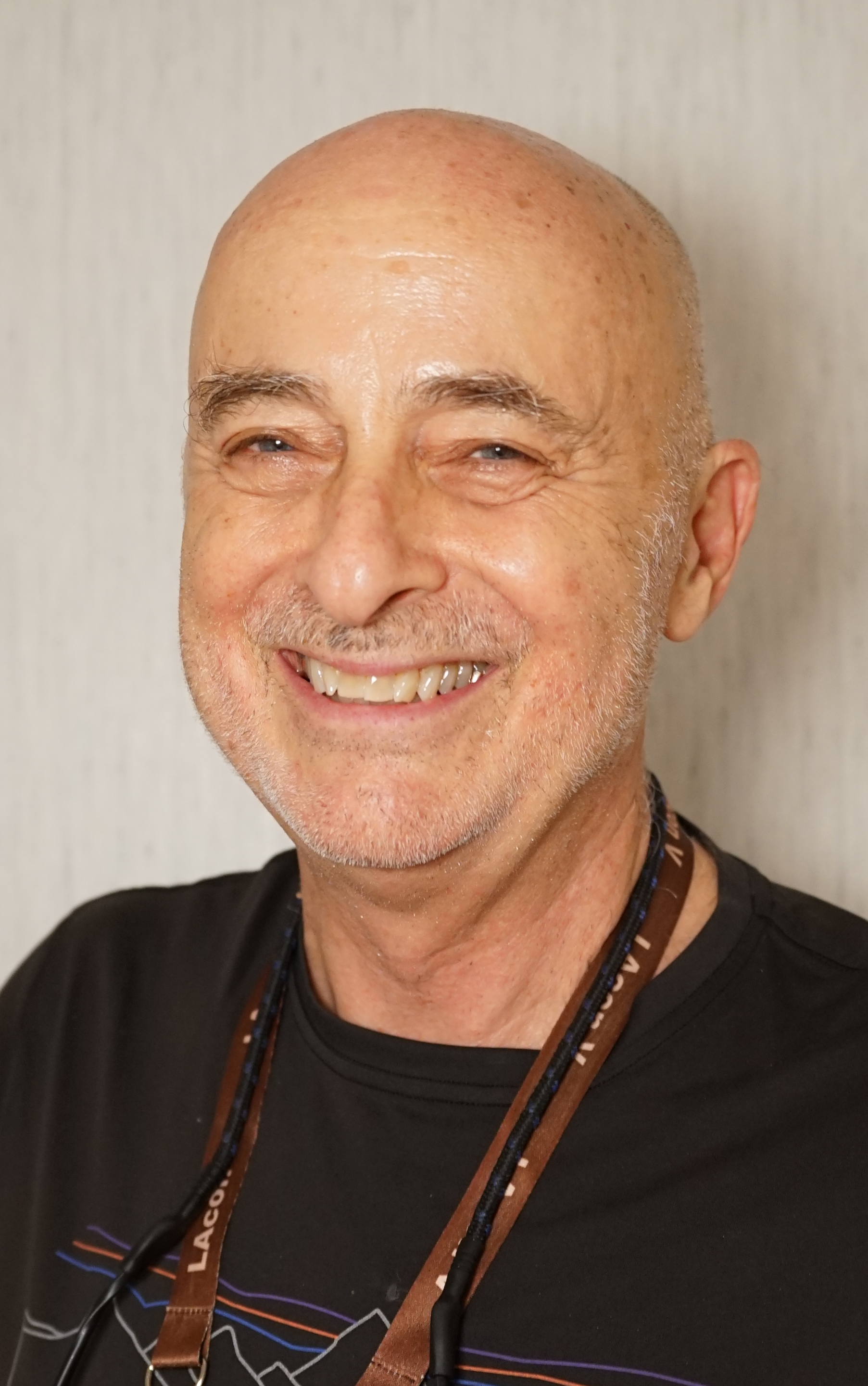
- Brin at Worldcon 2026
- Born: Glen David Brin; October 6, 1950 (age 75); Glendale, California, U.S.
- Education: University of California, San Diego (PhD, MS); California Institute of Technology (BS)
- Occupations: Novelist, NASA consultant
- Father: Herb Brin
- Writing career
- Genre: Science fiction
- Notable works: Uplift series, The Postman, Earth, "The Transparent Society"
- Scientific career
- Fields: Astronomy; Exobiology
- Workplaces: Jet Propulsion Laboratory; University of California, San Diego
- Thesis: Evolution of cometary nuclei as influenced by a dust component (1981)
- Doctoral advisor: D. Asoka Mendis
- Website: davidbrin.com

Signature
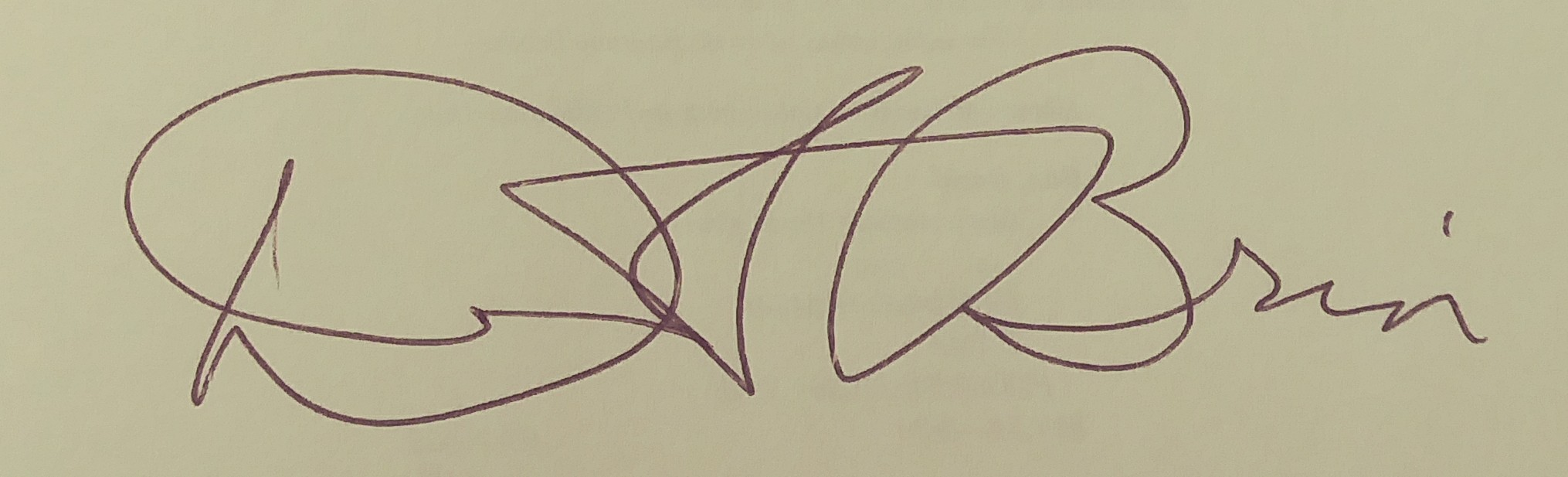

Glen David Brin (born October 6, 1950) is an American science fiction author. He has won the Hugo, Locus, Campbell and Nebula Awards. His novel The Postman was adapted into a 1997 feature film starring Kevin Costner.

== Early life and education ==
Brin was born October 6, 1950, in Glendale, California, to Jewish parents Selma and Herb Brin. He graduated from the California Institute of Technology with a Bachelor of Science in astronomy, in 1973. At the University of California, San Diego, he earned a Master of Science in electrical engineering (optics) in 1978 and a Doctor of Philosophy degree in astronomy in 1981.

== Career ==
From 1983 to 1986, he was a postdoctoral research fellow at the California Space Institute, of the University of California, at the San Diego campus in La Jolla. In 2010, Brin became a fellow of the Institute for Ethics and Emerging Technologies. He helped establish the Arthur C. Clarke Center for Human Imagination at UCSD. He serves on the advisory board of NASA's Innovative and Advanced Concepts group and frequently does futurist consulting for corporations and government agencies.

As of 2013, he served on the Board of Advisors for the Museum of Science Fiction.

== Personal life ==
Brin has Polish Jewish ancestry, from the area around Konin. His grandfather was drafted into the Russian army and fought in the Russo-Japanese War of 1904–1905.

As of 2022, Brin was living in San Diego County, California, with his wife and children.

== Works ==
Most of Brin's fiction is categorized as hard science fiction, in that they apply some degree of plausible scientific or technological change as important plot elements. About half of Brin's works are in his Uplift Universe. These have twice won the Hugo Award for Best Novel.

Much of Brin's work outside the Uplift series focuses on technology's effects on human society.

== Bibliography ==
=== Fiction ===
==== Uplift ====
Novels:

- Sundiver (1980), ISBN 0-553-13312-8
- Startide Rising (1983), ISBN 0-553-23495-1. Hugo and Locus SF Awards winner, 1984; Nebula Award winner, 1983
- The Uplift War (1987), ISBN 0-932096-44-1. Hugo and Locus SF Awards winner, 1988; Nebula Award nominee, 1987

Uplift trilogy, a.k.a. Uplift Storm:

- Brightness Reef (1995) ISBN 0-553-10034-3. Hugo and Locus SF Awards nominee, 1996
- Infinity's Shore (1996), ISBN 0-553-57777-8
- Heaven's Reach (1998), ISBN 0-553-57473-6

Short fiction:

- "Aficionado" (1998) was first published as "Life in the Extreme" in Popular Science magazine, republished in the 2003 limited-edition collection Tomorrow Happens, and included in Brin's 2012 novel Existence. It is available on Brin's website. "Aficionado" takes place before the novels.
- "Temptation" (1999) appeared in Robert Silverberg's anthology Far Horizons: All New Tales from the Greatest Worlds of Science Fiction and is set after the events of Infinity's Shore.

Other works:

- Contacting Aliens: An Illustrated Guide to David Brin's Uplift Universe (2002), ISBN 978-0553377965 (co-written by Brin and Kevin Lenagh)

==== High Horizon ====
- Colony High (February 2021) ISBN 978-1953034526; reprinted June 2023 ISBN 978-1961511132
- Castaways of New Mojave (August 2021) 978-1956015126; reprinted October 2023 ISBN 978-1961511514 – with Jeff Carlson

==== Stand-alone novels ====
- The Practice Effect (1984), ISBN 978-0-553-23992-8
- The Postman (1985), ISBN 0-553-05107-5 – Campbell and Locus SF Awards winner, Hugo Award nominee, 1986; Nebula Award nominee, 1985. Originally appeared, in substantially different form, as a three-part novella in Isaac Asimov's Science Fiction Magazine. Filmed by Kevin Costner as a major motion picture.
- Heart of the Comet (1986), ISBN 0-553-25839-7 (with Gregory Benford) – Locus SF Award nominee, 1987
- Earth (1990), ISBN 0-553-07064-9 – Hugo and Locus SF Awards nominee, 1991. Contains many successful predictions of current trends (such as email spam) and technologies.
- Glory Season (1993), ISBN 0-553-07645-0 – Hugo and Locus SF Awards nominee, 1994
- Kiln People (2002; published in the UK as Kil'n People), ISBN 0-7653-0355-8 – Campbell, Clarke, Hugo, and Locus SF Awards nominee, 2003. It was shortlisted in four different awards for best SF/fantasy novel of 2002—the Hugo, the Locus, the John W. Campbell Award, and the Arthur C. Clarke Award; each time finishing behind a different book.
- Existence, Tor Books (2012), ISBN 978-0-765-30361-5
- The Ancient Ones, self-published (2020), ISBN 978-1-70798-865-5

==== Comics ====
- Forgiveness (2002), ISBN 978-1563898501 (Star Trek: The Next Generation graphic novel)
- The Life Eaters (2003), ISBN 978-1401200985 (published by the Wildstorm imprint of DC Comics, art by Scott Hampton)
- Tinkerers (2010) (discussion of the causes of the decline of American manufacturing)

==== Short fiction collections ====
- The River of Time (1986), ISBN 0-913165-11-5
- Otherness (1994), ISBN 1-85723-310-7
- Tomorrow Happens (2003), ISBN 978-1886778436
- Insistence of Vision (2016), ISBN 978-1611882216
- The Best of David Brin (2021), ISBN 978-1645240099

==== Fiction set in worlds created by others ====
- Foundation's Triumph (1999), novel set in Asimov's Foundation Universe, ISBN 978-0-06-105639-0
- "71" in Ring of Fire IV (2016) anthology, short story set in Eric Flint's 1632-verse, ISBN 978-1476781242

==== Games ====
Brin designed the game Tribes, published in 1998 by Steve Jackson Games, and wrote the storyline for the 2000 Dreamcast video game Ecco the Dolphin: Defender of the Future.

=== Nonfiction ===
Ongoing:

- Articles in professional journals, including The Astrophysical Journal and Information Technology and Libraries; as well as popular magazines, such as Omni, Nature, and Popular Science.

Books:

- Extraterrestrial Civilization by Thomas Kuiper and Glen David Brin, (1989) ISBN 0917853385
- The Transparent Society: Will Technology Force Us to Choose Between Privacy and Freedom? (1998) ISBN 0-7382-0144-8—won the Eli M. Oboler Award for intellectual freedom from the American Library Association
- Star Wars on Trial: Science Fiction and Fantasy Writers Debate the Most Popular Science Fiction Films of All Time (2006) ISBN 1-932100-89-X
- Polemical Judo: Memes for our Political Knife-fight (2019) ISBN 978-1704368030

== Honors and awards ==
- 1984 Nebula Award for Best Novel
- 1984, 1988 Hugo Award for Best Novel
- 1985 Inkpot Award
- 1984, 1986, 1988 Locus Award for Best Science Fiction Novel
- 1985 Hugo Award for Best Short Story
- Small Solar System body 5748 Davebrin, discovered by Eleanor Helin in 1991, is named in his honor.
