= Earth (Brin novel) =

1990 science fiction novel by David Brin

- Cover of first edition (hardcover) and the second edition (paperback)
- Author: David Brin
- Language: English
- Genre: Science fiction
- Publisher: Bantam Books
- Publication date: 1990
- Publication place: United States
- Media type: Print (Hardcover & Paperback)
- Pages: 601
- ISBN: 0-553-07064-9
- OCLC: 310399836

Earth is a 1990 science fiction novel by American writer David Brin. The book was nominated for the Hugo and Locus Awards in 1991.

== Plot summary ==
Set in the year 2038, Earth is a cautionary tale of the harm humans can cause their planet via disregard for the environment and reckless scientific experiments. The book has a large cast of characters and Brin uses them to address a number of environmental issues, including endangered species, global warming, refugees from ecological disasters, ecoterrorism, and the social effects of overpopulation. The plot of the book involves an artificially created black hole that has been lost in the Earth's interior and the attempts to recover it before it destroys the planet. The events and revelations that follow reshape humanity and its future in the universe. It also includes a war pitting most of the Earth against Switzerland, fueled by outrage over the Swiss allowing generations of kleptocrats to hide their stolen wealth in the country's banks.

The scope of the story expands vastly as the plot gradually reveals itself, bringing into question the future course—and even the survival—of humanity.

== Predictions ==
Brin set this novel 50 years in the future from the time he was writing, using the book as an opportunity to predict what technologies might — at that future date — be taken for granted day to day. Three technologies he predicted came to pass within only 8 years of the writing, including a media-centric, hypertext Internet, email spam, and the proliferation of personal video recording devices.

Brin claims at least 15 predictive hits in Earth, including:

- The World Wide Web (including it as being a major news-media outlet, complete with videos and discussion forums) and blogging. (Brin did not predict the URL, rather using a clumsier numeric form of address.)
- E-mail spam and sophisticated personalized filtering software.
- Reduction of expectation of privacy.
- Time limits on secrets of a personal, corporate, and governmental nature.
- Levees breaking on the Mississippi.
- The dissolution and partitioning of the Soviet Union (though most contemporary scholars later claimed that they were fully aware of the Soviet Union's impending collapse by 1989).
- Global warming associated sea level rise and severe storm seasons.
- Subvocal input devices.
- Artificially created black holes considered seriously.
- Crisis habitat arks for endangered species, with a view to later restoration to the wild.
- Eyeglass cameras.
- Eyeglass overlays on real environments.
- Art sculptures on a geologic scale.
- Decline of delivered mail.
- Lawyer software.

== Reception ==
The book received a number of reviews, including:

- by Tom Whitmore (1990) in Locus, #352 May 1990
- by Dan Chow (1990) in Locus, #353 June 1990
- by Don D'Ammassa (1990) in Science Fiction Chronicle, #129 June 1990
- by Russell Letson (1990) in Locus, #353 June 1990
- by Stephen P. Brown (1990) in Science Fiction Eye, #7, August 1990
- by Algis Budrys (1990) in The Magazine of Fantasy & Science Fiction, August 1990
- by Janice M. Eisen (1990) in Aboriginal Science Fiction, September–October 1990
- by John Clute (1990) in Interzone, #39 September 1990
- by John Gribbin (1990) in Vector 157
- by Baird Searles (1990) in Isaac Asimov's Science Fiction Magazine, November 1990
- by Thomas A. Easton [as Tom Easton] (1990) in Analog Science Fiction and Fact, November 1990
- by Norman Spinrad (1991) in Isaac Asimov's Science Fiction Magazine, June 1991
- by Sue Thomason (1991) in Paperback Inferno, #92
- by L. E. Modesitt, Jr. (1991) in The New York Review of Science Fiction, November 1991
- by Ivan Towlson (1991) in Foundation, #52 Summer 1991
- [in French] by Piet Hollander (1992) in Yellow Submarine, #92

== See also ==
- Effects of global warming
- Gaia hypothesis
- Gravitational radiation
- Micro black hole
- Tunguska event
